= South Iowa Cedar League =

Iowa High School athletic conference

- Conference: IHSAA / IGHSAU
- Founded: 1936
- Sports fielded: 13; men's: 6; women's: 7
- No. of teams: 12
- Region: Eastern Iowa
- Website: www.southiowacedarleague.org

The South Iowa Cedar League is a high school athletic conference in south central and southeastern Iowa. The conference is made up of mostly 1A schools, as well as a few 2A schools (the two smallest classes in the state).

A 9-team league from the 1960s, the conference expanded to 12 teams in 1996, then dropped to 11 members when Williamsburg joined the Eastern Iowa Hawkeye Conference in 2000. In the fall of 2014, the schools of the SICL voted to allow Colfax–Mingo to join the SICL, making it a 12-team league again. The conference voted in 2026 to grant membership to East Marshall, planned to take place in the fall of 2027.

== Members ==
Institution	Location	Mascot	Colors	Affiliation	2026-2027 BEDS
Belle Plaine	Belle Plaine	Plainsman		Public	110
B-G-M	Brooklyn	Bears		Public	121
Colfax–Mingo	Colfax	Tigerhawks		Public	142
English Valleys	North English	Bears		Public	93
H-L-V	Victor	Warriors		Public	62
Iowa Valley	Marengo	Tigers		Public	113
Keota	Keota	Eagles		Public	59
Lynnville–Sully	Sully	Hawks		Public	124
Montezuma	Montezuma	Braves		Public	104
North Mahaska	New Sharon	Warhawks		Public	125
Sigourney	Sigourney	Savages		Public	149
Tri-County	Thornburg	Trojans		Public	44

== Sports ==
Boys' sports are administered through the Iowa High School Athletic Association, and girls' sports are administered through the Iowa Girls High School Athletic Union. Sports classes for each are based on enrollment.

Football is played by districts based on their enrollment classification and geography, instead of by conference. Most SICL schools are in Class A, the smallest of five classifications for the 11-man football game, although Sigourney-Keota—which has had a cooperative agreement since 1987—is Class 1A. As of 2019, four SICL schools—Iowa Valley, English Valleys, HLV and Tri-County—play eight-man football.

The conference offers the following sports:

- Fall — volleyball, boys' cross-country and girls' cross-country.
- Winter — Boys' basketball, girls' basketball and boys' wrestling and girls' wrestling.
- Spring — Boys' track and field, girls' track and field, boys' golf and girls' golf.
- Summer — Baseball and softball.

Although the member schools field junior varsity teams (for freshman and sophomore athletes) in many of the above-mentioned sports, conference championships are determined at varsity level only. Also, not all schools field teams in every sport, while others are part of cooperative sharing agreements with schools within and outside the SICL.

=== State championships ===
Year	Sport	Class	School
1964	Girls' track and field	-	Belle Plaine
1965	Girls' track and field	-	Belle Plaine
1966	Girls' track and field	-	Belle Plaine
1969	Girls' basketball	-	Montezuma
1969	Boys' track and field	B	Belle Plaine
1970	Girls' basketball	-	Montezuma
1971	Boys' basketball	1A	Montezuma
1971	Boys' track and field	B	Belle Plaine
1976	Wrestling	1A	Belle Plaine
1979	Football	2A	Sigourney
1984	Girls' track and field	1A	Belle Plaine
1985	Boys' track and field	2A	Iowa Valley
1989	Boys' basketball	A	Keota
1990	Boys' basketball	1A	Montezuma
1990	Girls' track and field	1A	Sigourney
1991	Boys' cross country	1A	Williamsburg
1991	Girls' track and field	1A	Sigourney
1992	Girls' track and field	1A	Sigourney
1994	Girls' golf	1A	Williamsburg
1995	Football	2A	Sigourney-Keota
1996	Girls' cross country	1A	Lynnville–Sully
1997	Girls' basketball	1A	Lynnville–Sully
1998	Girls' basketball	1A	Lynnville–Sully
1998	Girls' track and field	1A	Belle Plaine
1999	Girls' basketball	1A	Lynnville–Sully
2001	Wrestling	1A	Belle Plaine
2001	Football	2A	Sigourney-Keota
2001	Wrestling Duals	1A	Belle Plaine
2002	Boys' golf	2A	Belle Plaine
2005	Football	A	North Mahaska
2005	Football	2A	Sigourney-Keota
2005	Boys' basketball	1A	North Mahaska
2012	Girls' basketball	1A	North Mahaska
2018	Girls golf	1A	Iowa Valley
2021	Boys' basketball	1A	Montezuma
