= Jeff Criswell =

American football player (born 1964)

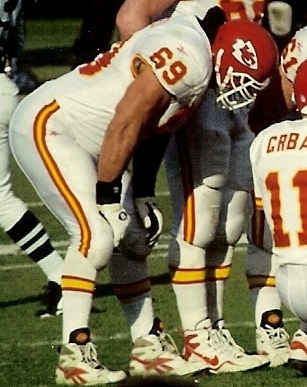
- Criswell with the Kansas City Chiefs in 1997

No. 62, 61, 69
- Positions: Offensive tackle, guard

Personal information
- Born: March 7, 1964 (age 62); Grinnell, Iowa, U.S.
- Listed height: 6 ft 7 in (2.01 m)
- Listed weight: 291 lb (132 kg)

Career information
- High school: Lynnville-Sully (Sully, Iowa)
- College: Graceland
- NFL draft: 1985: undrafted

Career history
- Indianapolis Colts (1987); New York Jets (1988–1994); Kansas City Chiefs (1995–1998)

Career NFL statistics
- Games played: 171
- Games started: 146
- Fumble recoveries: 3
- Stats at Pro Football Reference

Jeffrey L. Criswell (born March 7, 1964) is an American former professional football player who was an offensive lineman for 12 seasons in the National Football League (NFL). Criswell attended Lynnville-Sully High School and played college football for the Graceland Yellowjackets.
