= Iowa Valley Community School District =

Public school district in Marengo, Iowa, United States

Coordinates: 41.798876°N 92.066893°W

Location
- Marengo, Iowa Iowa County United States
- Coordinates: 41.798876,-92.066893

District information
- Type: Local school district
- Grades: K-12
- Established: 1958
- Superintendent: Curt Rheingans
- Schools: 2
- Budget: $7,955,000 (2020-21)
- NCES District ID: 1914850

Students and staff
- Students: 547 (2022-23)
- Teachers: 40.62 FTE
- Staff: 34.36 FTE
- Student–teacher ratio: 13.47
- Athletic conference: South Iowa Cedar League
- District mascot: Tiger
- Colors: Orange and Black

Other information
- Website: www.iowa-valley.k12.ia.us

The Iowa Valley Community School District is a rural public school district headquartered in Marengo, Iowa. The district spans areas of north-central Iowa County, including the town of Marengo, and the unincorporated area of Koszta, Iowa.

The school district is accredited by the North Central Association of Colleges and Schools and the Iowa Department of Education.

The district is a member of the South Iowa Cedar League conference. The mascot for both schools is the Tigers, and the school colors are orange and black.

As of 2018, the district shares a superintendent with the English Valleys Community School District. The previous superintendent was scheduled to retire that year so the two districts sought a new one. The district is governed by a five-member board of directors, which meets monthly.

In 2021, Carl Rheingans was hired as superintendent, succeeding Mark Olmstead.

== History ==
=== Early history ===
The first high school program in Marengo began in 1869, expanded to a four-year high school curriculum in 1871, and the first graduate was in 1872. In 1902, lightning struck the school building, destroying the third floor and belfry. The core of the current building, The Carson High School, named for the former superintendent, was built in 1925 and dedicated in 1927, though the school was still called Marengo High School.

=== Consolidation ===
In 1958, the school district consolidated and expanded to incorporate adjacent rural areas and changed the name from Marengo to Iowa Valley (based on the adjacent Iowa River). The name of the high school was also changed from Marengo High School to Iowa Valley High School. In 1972, a gymnasium, band/vocal music room and two science classrooms were added to the west end of the building.

=== Milestones ===
- 1850 - first school formed and log cabin constructed for classes
- 1861 - Marengo Independent School District formed
- 1869 - 11-grade system began in Marengo
- 1871 - four-year high school curriculum began, orange and black school colors adopted
- 1892 - a scandal was reported, as the school janitor, appointed by the school board to purchase school books, disappeared after emptying his bank account.
- 1903 - new high school constructed
- 1910 - first yearbook published
- 1910 - Marengo designated a normal training school, training students to become teachers
- 1925 - new high school building (current school) was built, 1903 building was used for elementary school

The Carson High School, circa 1925

- 1954 - junior high wing was added to the high school
- 1958 - with the decline of rural, one-room schools, the area encompassing Marengo, Cono, Washington and portions of Sumner, Honey Creek and Hilton townships merged to form the Iowa Valley Community School District.
- 1962 - current elementary school was constructed
- 1990 - cooperative program with Kirkwood Community College for Health Careers began

== Enrollment ==
View source data.

== Schools ==
The district operates two schools, both in Marengo:

- Iowa Valley Elementary School (K-6)

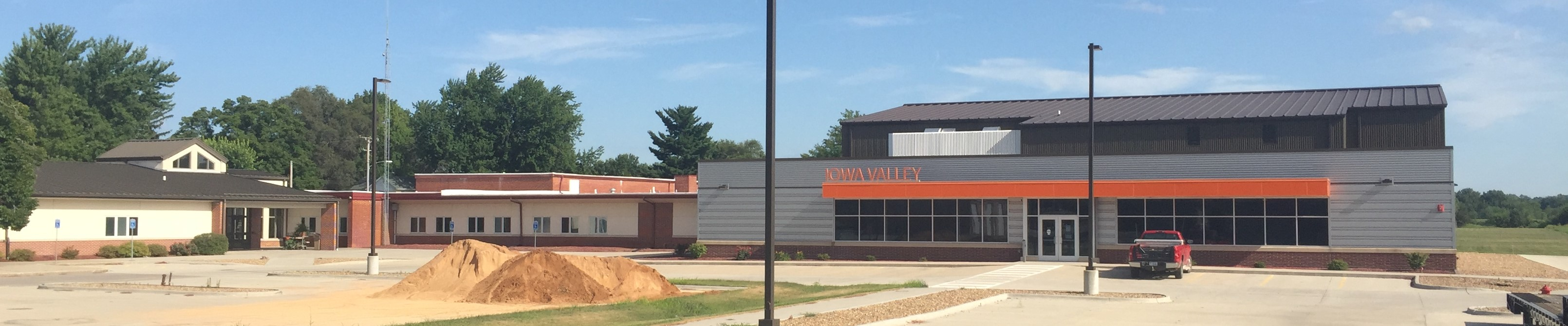
Iowa Valley Elementary School

- Iowa Valley Junior-Senior High School (7-12)

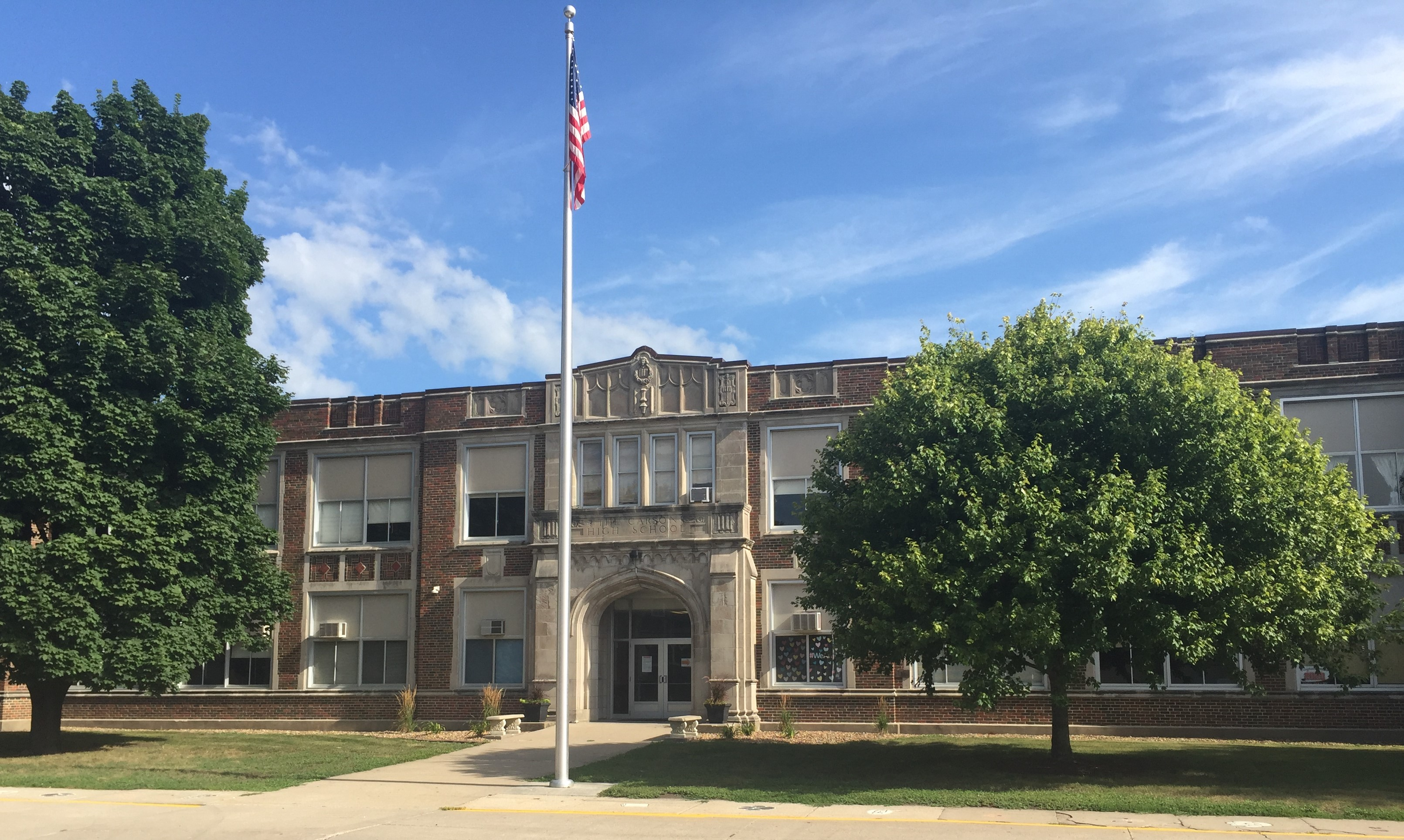
Iowa Valley Jr-Sr High School

The administrative offices are located at the high school.

=== Iowa Valley Junior-Senior High School ===
==== Activities ====
Students at IVHS can participate in numerous activities, including band, choir, speech, drama, FCS, FFA, Student Council, and Yearbook.

==== Athletics ====
The Tigers compete in the South Iowa Cedar League Conference in the following sports.

- Cross Country
- Volleyball
- Football, eight-player
- Basketball (as with many schools in Iowa, Iowa Valley girls played six-on-six until 1993)
- Wrestling
  - 9 individual State Champions
- Track and Field
  - Boys' Class 2A State Champions, 1985
- Golf
  - Girls' Class 1A State Champions, 2018
- Baseball
- Softball

===== State championships =====
The Tigers won the 1985 State Championship in Class 2A Boys' Track and Field, winning six events (110m hurdles, long jump, 400m hurdles, 1600m run, 3200m run, and the 1600m medley relay) with five athletes.

The Tigers won the 2018 State Championship in Class 1A Girls' Golf.

== Notable alumni ==
- Del Miller, class of 1968, is a college football coach, formerly head coach at Missouri State
- Rick Wanamaker, 1971 Pan American Games decathlon gold medalist
- Travis Fiser, American high school wrestling coach, former collegiate wrestler and a member of the National Wrestling Hall of Fame.
- Jarrod Uthoff, professional basketball player, attended Iowa Valley schools through 8th grade.

== See also ==
- List of school districts in Iowa
- List of high schools in Iowa
