= Millersburg, Iowa =

- City
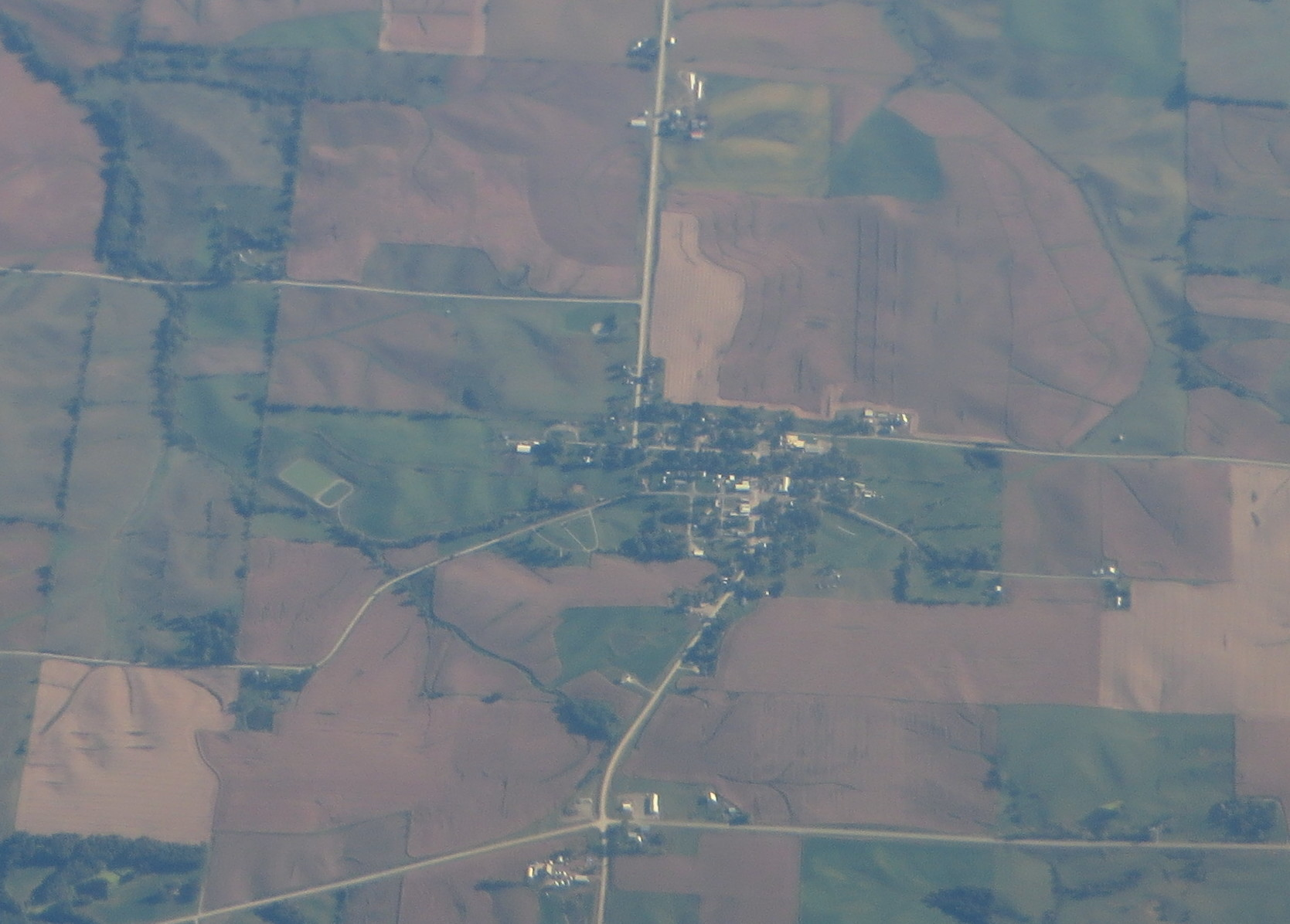
- Aerial view of Millersburg

- Location of Millersburg, Iowa
- Coordinates: 41°34′24″N 92°09′34″W
- Country: United States
- State: Iowa
- County: Iowa

Area
  - Total: 0.12 sq mi (0.31 km^{2})
  - Land: 0.12 sq mi (0.31 km^{2})
  - Water: 0 sq mi (0.00 km^{2})
- Elevation: 866 ft (264 m)

Population (2020)
  - Total: 135
  - Density: 1,110.2/sq mi (428.65/km^{2})
- Time zone: UTC-6 (Central (CST))
  - Summer (DST): UTC-5 (CDT)
- ZIP code: 52308
- Area code: 319
- FIPS code: 19-52230
- GNIS feature ID: 2395328

Millersburg is a city in Iowa County, Iowa, United States. The population was 135 at the time of the 2020 census.

== History ==
Millersburg was platted in 1852. It was named for its founder, Reuben Miller.

== Geography ==
According to the United States Census Bureau, the city has a total area of 0.14 square miles (0.36 km^{2}), all land.

== Demographics ==
Historical populations
Year	Pop.	±%
1880	221	—
1920	210	−5.0%
1930	198	−5.7%
1940	177	−10.6%
1950	200	+13.0%
1960	186	−7.0%
1970	187	+0.5%
1980	184	−1.6%
1990	188	+2.2%
2000	184	−2.1%
2010	159	−13.6%
2020	135	−15.1%
Source:"U.S. Census website". United States Census Bureau. and Iowa Data Center; Source: U.S. Decennial Census

=== 2020 census ===
As of the census of 2020, there were 135 people, 63 households, and 36 families residing in the city. The population density was 1,110.2 inhabitants per square mile (428.7/km^{2}). There were 73 housing units at an average density of 600.3 per square mile (231.8/km^{2}). The racial makeup of the city was 90.4% White, 0.0% Black or African American, 0.0% Native American, 0.0% Asian, 0.0% Pacific Islander, 7.4% from other races and 2.2% from two or more races. Hispanic or Latino persons of any race comprised 10.4% of the population.

Of the 63 households, 27.0% of which had children under the age of 18 living with them, 41.3% were married couples living together, 11.1% were cohabitating couples, 23.8% had a female householder with no spouse or partner present and 23.8% had a male householder with no spouse or partner present. 42.9% of all households were non-families. 38.1% of all households were made up of individuals, 23.8% had someone living alone who was 65 years old or older.

The median age in the city was 48.5 years. 18.5% of the residents were under the age of 20; 3.0% were between the ages of 20 and 24; 24.4% were from 25 and 44; 33.3% were from 45 and 64; and 20.7% were 65 years of age or older. The gender makeup of the city was 45.9% male and 54.1% female.

=== 2010 census ===
As of the census of 2010, there were 159 people, 72 households, and 44 families residing in the city. The population density was 1,135.7 inhabitants per square mile (438.5/km^{2}). There were 81 housing units at an average density of 578.6 per square mile (223.4/km^{2}). The racial makeup of the city was 98.7% White and 1.3% from two or more races. Hispanic or Latino of any race were 1.9% of the population.

There were 72 households, of which 26.4% had children under the age of 18 living with them, 45.8% were married couples living together, 8.3% had a female householder with no husband present, 6.9% had a male householder with no wife present, and 38.9% were non-families. 30.6% of all households were made up of individuals, and 18.1% had someone living alone who was 65 years of age or older. The average household size was 2.21 and the average family size was 2.70.

The median age in the city was 47.5 years. 18.9% of residents were under the age of 18; 7.4% were between the ages of 18 and 24; 17.5% were from 25 to 44; 40.2% were from 45 to 64; and 15.7% were 65 years of age or older. The gender makeup of the city was 47.8% male and 52.2% female.

=== 2000 census ===
As of the census of 2000, there were 184 people, 78 households, and 45 families residing in the city. The population density was 1,463.4 inhabitants per square mile (565.0/km^{2}). There were 82 housing units at an average density of 652.2 per square mile (251.8/km^{2}). The racial makeup of the city was 100.00% White.

There were 78 households, out of which 30.8% had children under the age of 18 living with them, 46.2% were married couples living together, 9.0% had a female householder with no husband present, and 42.3% were non-families. 37.2% of all households were made up of individuals, and 16.7% had someone living alone who was 65 years of age or older. The average household size was 2.36 and the average family size was 3.16.

In the city, the population was spread out, with 29.3% under the age of 18, 6.0% from 18 to 24, 29.9% from 25 to 44, 16.3% from 45 to 64, and 18.5% who were 65 years of age or older. The median age was 37 years. For every 100 females, there were 100.0 males. For every 100 females age 18 and over, there were 94.0 males.

The median income for a household in the city was $37,500, and the median income for a family was $31,250. Males had a median income of $31,528 versus $18,750 for females. The per capita income for the city was $18,233. About 14.0% of families and 14.4% of the population were below the poverty line, including 20.6% of those under the age of eighteen and 6.3% of those 65 or over.

== Education ==
Millersburg is within the English Valleys Community School District.

The community was previously within the Deep River–Millersburg Community School District, which was established in 1958 as a consolidation of the Millersburg and Deep River school districts. In 1992, the district closed its secondary school and began a joint whole grade-sharing program with the English Valleys district and the Montezuma Community School District, in which it sent its junior and senior high school students to both districts; each student chose which secondary school he/she wished to attend. On July 1, 2009, the DR-M district was consolidated into the English Valleys district, although a portion of it was given to the Montezuma district.

English Valleys took possession of the remaining school building in Millersburg and did not immediately decide as to its disposition. As of December 2009 it remained empty, and there were potential plans to convert the building into transitional housing for poor families or those affected by domestic violence.

== Notable person ==
- William J. Collins; the ninth President of St. Ambrose University

== In popular culture ==
- Evan Kelmp; fictitious character in the Dimension 20 Dungeons and Dragons video series "Misfits and Magic", portrayed by Brennan Lee Mulligan. Evan Kelmp is a character created for the D&D campaign in 2021.
