= Barnes City =

Barnes City may refer to:

- Barnes City, Iowa, United States
- Barnes City, California, United States (1920–1927), the early 20th century winter home of Al G. Barnes Circus incorporated and zoned for approximately seven months in 1927
