= Ladora, Iowa =

- City
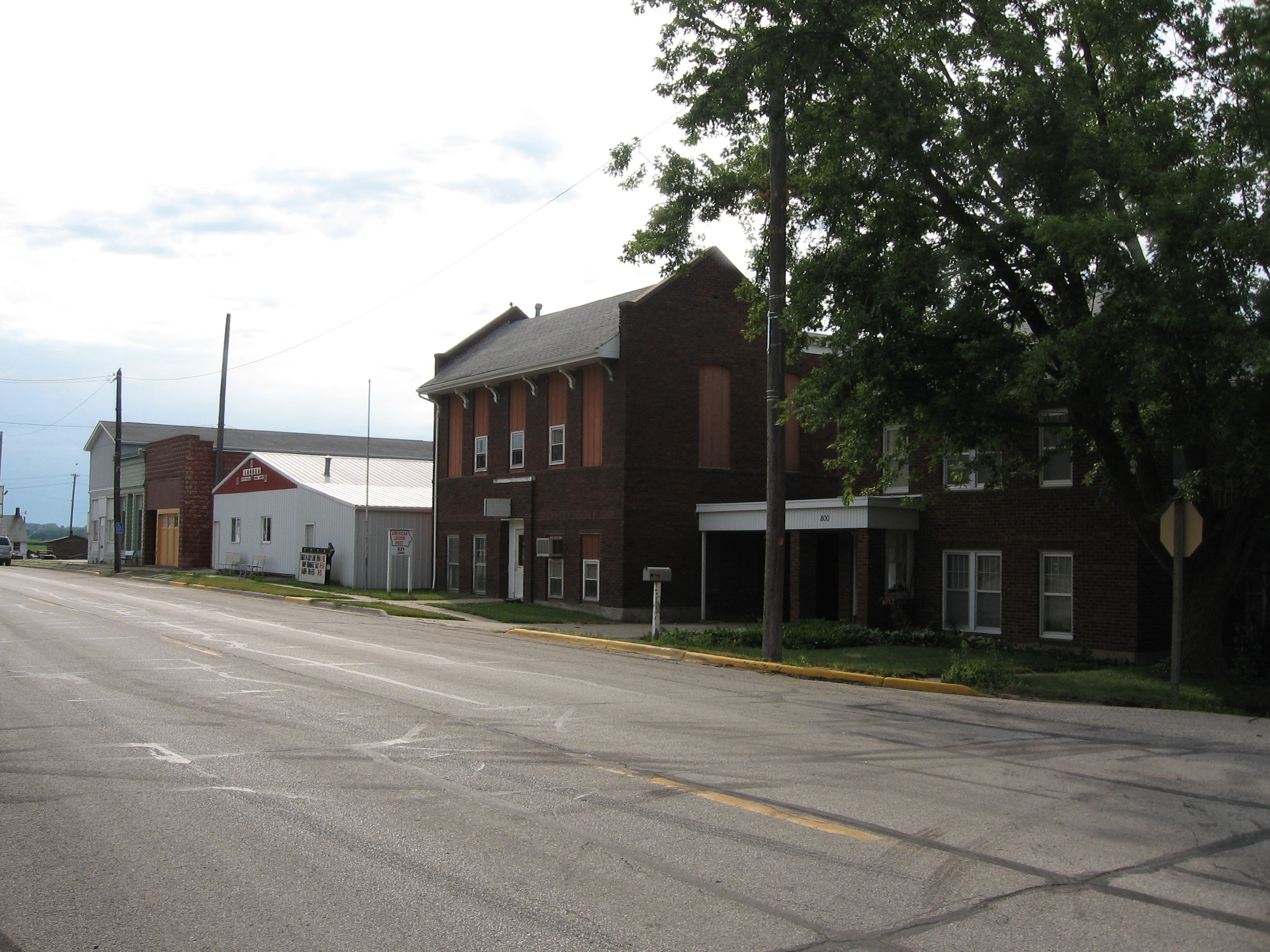
- Downtown Ladora, 2007

- Location of Ladora, Iowa
- Coordinates: 41°45′21″N 92°11′09″W
- Country: United States
- State: Iowa
- County: Iowa

Area
  - Total: 0.29 sq mi (0.76 km^{2})
  - Land: 0.29 sq mi (0.76 km^{2})
  - Water: 0 sq mi (0.00 km^{2})
- Elevation: 794 ft (242 m)

Population (2020)
  - Total: 229
  - Density: 777.4/sq mi (300.17/km^{2})
- Time zone: UTC-6 (Central (CST))
  - Summer (DST): UTC-5 (CDT)
- ZIP code: 52251
- Area code: 319
- FIPS code: 19-42330
- GNIS feature ID: 2395581

Ladora is a city in Iowa County, Iowa, United States. The population was 229 at the time of the 2020 census.

== History ==
Ladora was platted in 1867 and incorporated in 1879.

== Geography ==
According to the United States Census Bureau, the city has a total area of 0.30 square miles (0.78 km^{2}), all land.

== Demographics ==
Historical populations
Year	Pop.	±%
1880	211	—
1890	224	+6.2%
1900	239	+6.7%
1910	260	+8.8%
1920	340	+30.8%
1930	284	−16.5%
1940	300	+5.6%
1950	273	−9.0%
1960	307	+12.5%
1970	321	+4.6%
1980	289	−10.0%
1990	308	+6.6%
2000	287	−6.8%
2010	283	−1.4%
2020	229	−19.1%
Source:"U.S. Census website". United States Census Bureau. and Iowa Data Center; Source: U.S. Decennial Census

=== 2020 census ===
As of the census of 2020, there were 229 people, 99 households, and 57 families residing in the city. The population density was 777.4 inhabitants per square mile (300.2/km^{2}). There were 115 housing units at an average density of 390.4 per square mile (150.7/km^{2}). The racial makeup of the city was 94.3% White, 0.4% Black or African American, 0.0% Native American, 0.0% Asian, 0.0% Pacific Islander, 3.1% from other races and 2.2% from two or more races. Hispanic or Latino persons of any race comprised 3.1% of the population.

Of the 99 households, 32.3% of which had children under the age of 18 living with them, 42.4% were married couples living together, 7.1% were cohabitating couples, 21.2% had a female householder with no spouse or partner present and 29.3% had a male householder with no spouse or partner present. 42.4% of all households were non-families. 38.4% of all households were made up of individuals, 18.2% had someone living alone who was 65 years old or older.

The median age in the city was 44.5 years. 24.9% of the residents were under the age of 20; 3.1% were between the ages of 20 and 24; 22.3% were from 25 and 44; 35.4% were from 45 and 64; and 14.4% were 65 years of age or older. The gender makeup of the city was 54.6% male and 45.4% female.

=== 2010 census ===
As of the census of 2010, there were 283 people, 116 households, and 71 families living in the city. The population density was 943.3 inhabitants per square mile (364.2/km^{2}). There were 126 housing units at an average density of 420.0 per square mile (162.2/km^{2}). The racial makeup of the city was 96.8% White, 2.5% African American, and 0.7% from two or more races. Hispanic or Latino of any race were 1.1% of the population.

There were 116 households, of which 34.5% had children under the age of 18 living with them, 44.0% were married couples living together, 9.5% had a female householder with no husband present, 7.8% had a male householder with no wife present, and 38.8% were non-families. 32.8% of all households were made up of individuals, and 10.4% had someone living alone who was 65 years of age or older. The average household size was 2.44 and the average family size was 3.11.

The median age in the city was 34.9 years. 25.1% of residents were under the age of 18; 10.2% were between the ages of 18 and 24; 27.3% were from 25 to 44; 28.6% were from 45 to 64; and 8.8% were 65 years of age or older. The gender makeup of the city was 49.1% male and 50.9% female.

=== 2000 census ===
As of the census of 2000, there were 287 people, 121 households, and 75 families living in the city. The population density was 937.8 inhabitants per square mile (362.1/km^{2}). There were 129 housing units at an average density of 421.5 per square mile (162.7/km^{2}). The racial makeup of the city was 99.65% White, 0.35% from other races. Hispanic or Latino of any race were 1.39% of the population.

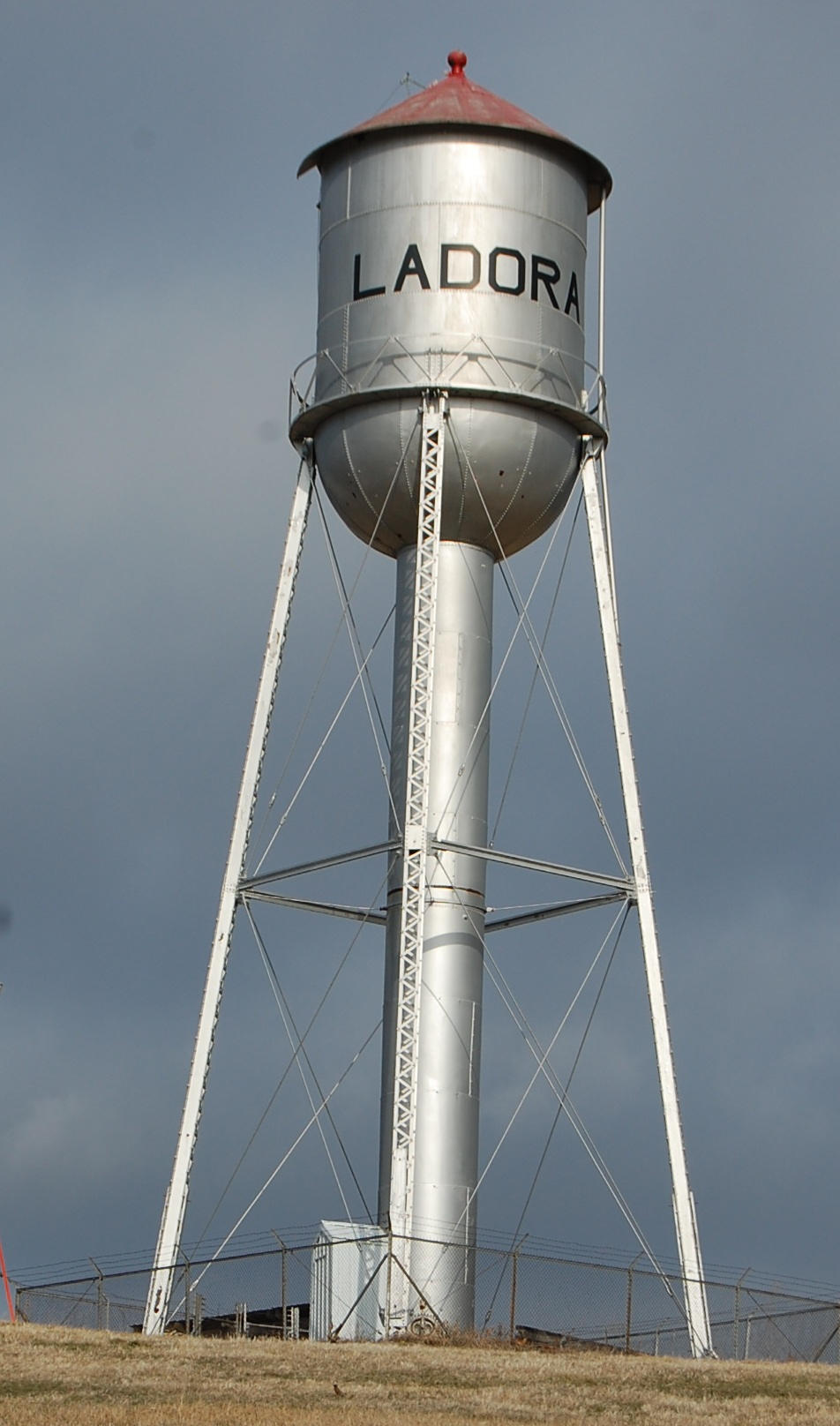
Water tower in Ladora

There were 121 households, out of which 31.4% had children under the age of 18 living with them, 52.9% were married couples living together, 5.8% had a female householder with no husband present, and 38.0% were non-families. 32.2% of all households were made up of individuals, and 15.7% had someone living alone who was 65 years of age or older. The average household size was 2.37 and the average family size was 3.05.

In the city, the population was spread out, with 26.1% under the age of 18, 8.7% from 18 to 24, 32.4% from 25 to 44, 18.5% from 45 to 64, and 14.3% who were 65 years of age or older. The median age was 36 years. For every 100 females, there were 120.8 males. For every 100 females age 18 and over, there were 107.8 males.

The median income for a household in the city was $36,875, and the median income for a family was $48,333. Males had a median income of $30,156 versus $21,528 for females. The per capita income for the city was $15,888. About 7.4% of families and 8.5% of the population were below the poverty line, including 5.0% of those under the age of eighteen and 8.6% of those 65 or over.

== Education ==
H-L-V Community School District operates area public schools.

== Rolle Bolle ==
Ladora's Rolle Bolle courts are located behind Locust Street and Iowa Street. The traditional Belgian yard game, which is still being played by locals, was originally imported to the region by Belgian immigrants in the late 19th and early 20th centuries. It is also played in the nearby towns of Belle Plaine, Clutier, Victor, Marengo, and Blairstown.

== Notable person ==
- Mildred Wirt Benson, journalist and author, famous for writing the first editions of the Nancy Drew book series.
