= BGM Community School District =

Public school district in Iowa, US

Address
- 1090 Jackson St; Brooklyn, Iowa Poweshiek County United States
- Coordinates: 41°44′19″N 92°26′49″W

District information
- Type: Local school district
- Grades: K–12
- Established: 1960; 66 years ago
- Superintendent: Brad Hohensee
- Budget: $9,812,000 (2020-21)
- NCES District ID: 1905490

Students and staff
- Students: 561 (2022-23)
- Teachers: 42.76 FTE
- Staff: 45.50 FTE
- Student–teacher ratio: 13.12
- Athletic conference: South Iowa Cedar League
- District mascot: Bears
- Colors: Blue and Red

Other information
- Website: www.brooklyn.k12.ia.us

The Brooklyn-Guernsey-Malcom (BGM) Community School District, or BGM Community School, serves the towns of Brooklyn, Guernsey and Malcom and surrounding areas in eastern Poweshiek County, Iowa.

The school, which serves all grade levels PreK–12 in one building, is located at 1090 Jackson Street in Brooklyn.

The BGM Community and H-L-V Community School Districts have a shared learning agreement.

The school's mascot is the Bears. Their colors are red and royal blue.

== Schools ==
The district operates two schools within a single facility in Brooklyn: Brooklyn-Guernsey-Malcom Elementary School and Brooklyn-Guernsey-Malcom Junior-Senior High School

=== Brooklyn-Guernsey-Malcom Junior-Senior High School ===
==== Athletics ====
The Bears compete in the South Iowa Cedar League Conference in the following sports:

- Cross Country (boys and girls)
  - Boys' State Champions – 1970
  - Girls' State Champions – 1969, 1970, 1971, 1983
- Volleyball
- Football
- Basketball (boys and girls)
- Wrestling (boys and girls)
- Track and Field (boys and girls)
- Golf (boys and girls)
- Baseball (boys)
- Softball (girls)

== See also ==
- List of school districts in Iowa
- List of high schools in Iowa
