= Albert M. Sackett =

U.S. Navy rear admiral (1920–2016)

- Born: June 24, 1920; Victor, Iowa, U.S.
- Died: May 20, 2016 (aged 95); Washington, D. C., U.S.
- Military career
- Allegiance: United States
- Branch: United States Navy
- Service years: 1944–1977
- Rank: Rear admiral

Albert Monroe Sackett (June 24, 1920 – May 20, 2016) was a rear admiral in the United States Navy. He was a commandant of the Ninth Naval District, from June 1976 to August 1977.
