= H-L-V Community School District =

Public school district in Iowa, US

Address
- 402 Fifth St. Victor, Iowa Iowa and Poweshiek counties United States
- Coordinates: 41°43′46″N 92°17′40″W

District information
- Type: Local school district
- Grades: K–12
- Established: 1958
- Superintendent: Brad Hohensee
- Budget: $6,246,000 (2020-21)
- NCES District ID: 1913380

Students and staff
- Enrollment: 303 (2022-23)
- Teachers: 25.37 (on an FTE basis)
- Staff: 27.39 (on an FTE basis)
- Student–teacher ratio: 11.94
- Athletic conference: South Iowa Cedar League
- District mascot: Warriors
- Colors: Red and black

Other information
- Website: www.hlv.k12.ia.us

The Hartwick-Ladora-Victor Community School District – often abbreviated H-L-V, or HLV – is a rural public school district headquartered in Victor, Iowa.

The district spans areas of eastern Poweshiek and western Iowa counties, encompassing the communities of Hartwick, Ladora and Victor.

The main school campus is located in Victor. The school building has separate elementary and a junior high wings, and its administrative offices are also located there. The district is governed by a five-member board of directors, which meets monthly.

The school district is accredited by the North Central Association of Colleges and Schools and the Iowa Department of Education.

The H-L-V School District was formed in 1958, the result of the merger of three former school districts: Hartwick, Ladora and Victor. Athletic teams are known as the Warriors.

== Athletics ==
The Warriors compete in the South Iowa Cedar League Conference in the following sports:

- Cross Country
- Volleyball
- Football
- Basketball
- Wrestling
- Track and Field
- Golf
- Baseball
- Softball

== See also ==
- List of school districts in Iowa
- List of high schools in Iowa
