= Jackie Collum =

American baseball player (1927–2009)

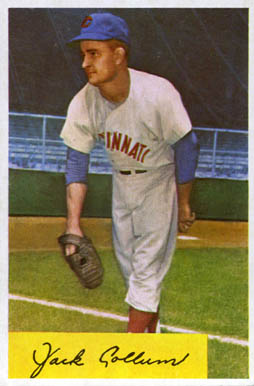
- Pitcher
- Born: June 21, 1927; Victor, Iowa, U.S.
- Died: August 29, 2009 (aged 82); Grinnell, Iowa, U.S.
- Batted: Left Threw: Left

MLB debut
- September 21, 1951, for the St. Louis Cardinals

Last MLB appearance
- August 23, 1962, for the Cleveland Indians

MLB statistics
- Win–loss record: 32–28
- Earned run average: 4.15
- Strikeouts: 171
- Stats at Baseball Reference

Teams
- St. Louis Cardinals (1951–1953); Cincinnati Redlegs (1953–1955); St. Louis Cardinals (1956); Chicago Cubs (1957); Brooklyn / Los Angeles Dodgers (1957–1958); Minnesota Twins (1962); Cleveland Indians (1962)

John Dean Collum (June 21, 1927 – August 29, 2009) was an American pitcher in Major League Baseball (MLB) who played for eight different teams between the 1951 and 1962 seasons. Listed at 5 ft 7 in (1.70 m), 160 lb (73 kg), Collum batted and threw left-handed. He was born in Victor, Iowa.

Collum was one of four children of John Edward Collum and Sophia Louise Lohman and the youngest of three brothers. He was raised in Newburg, Iowa, near Grinnell, and graduated from Newburg High School, where he played in the Iowa State Baseball Tournament.

Collum served in World War II with the United States Army Air Forces in the Pacific Theatre of Operations, where he was stationed in the Philippines. Following the war he returned home and married Betty Belles on February 28, 1948. He pursued his major league dreams after going 24–2 in 1948 for Class-A St. Joseph Cardinals of the Western League.

Primarily a reliever, Collum also served in starting roles. He entered the major leagues in 1951 with the St. Louis Cardinals, playing for them until the 1953 midseason before joining the Cincinnati Redlegs from 1953 to 1955. After spending two years out of baseball, he rejoined the Cardinals in 1956 and also pitched with the Chicago Cubs in 1957 and for two Dodgers teams; in 1957, when they were leaving Brooklyn for the sunny skies of Los Angeles starting the 1958 season.

Collum's most productive season came with Cincinnati in 1955, when he recorded career-numbers in wins (9), earned run average (3.63) and complete games (5), while pitching 134 innings.

Collum also had stints with the Minnesota Twins and Cleveland Indians in 1962, his last major league season.

In a nine-season career, Collum posted a 32–28 record with a 4.15 ERA in 171 appearances, including 37 starts, 11 complete games, two shutouts, 12 saves, 171 strikeouts and 173 walks in 464 innings of work.

Collum also helped himself with the bat, hitting for a .246 average (29-for-118) with one home run, 15 runs, 13 RBI, five doubles, and a .321 on-base percentage.

Following his baseball career, Collum worked in the automotive business in Grinnell, Iowa, and was owner of Grinnel Pioneer Oil. He was inducted into the Iowa Baseball Hall of Fame and was also a member of the Major League Baseball Alumni Association and the Grinnell Eagles Lodge.

Collum died in the Mayflower Health Care Center in Grinnell at the age of 82. He was buried at Rock Creek Cemetery of Grinnell.
