= Barnes City, Iowa =

- City
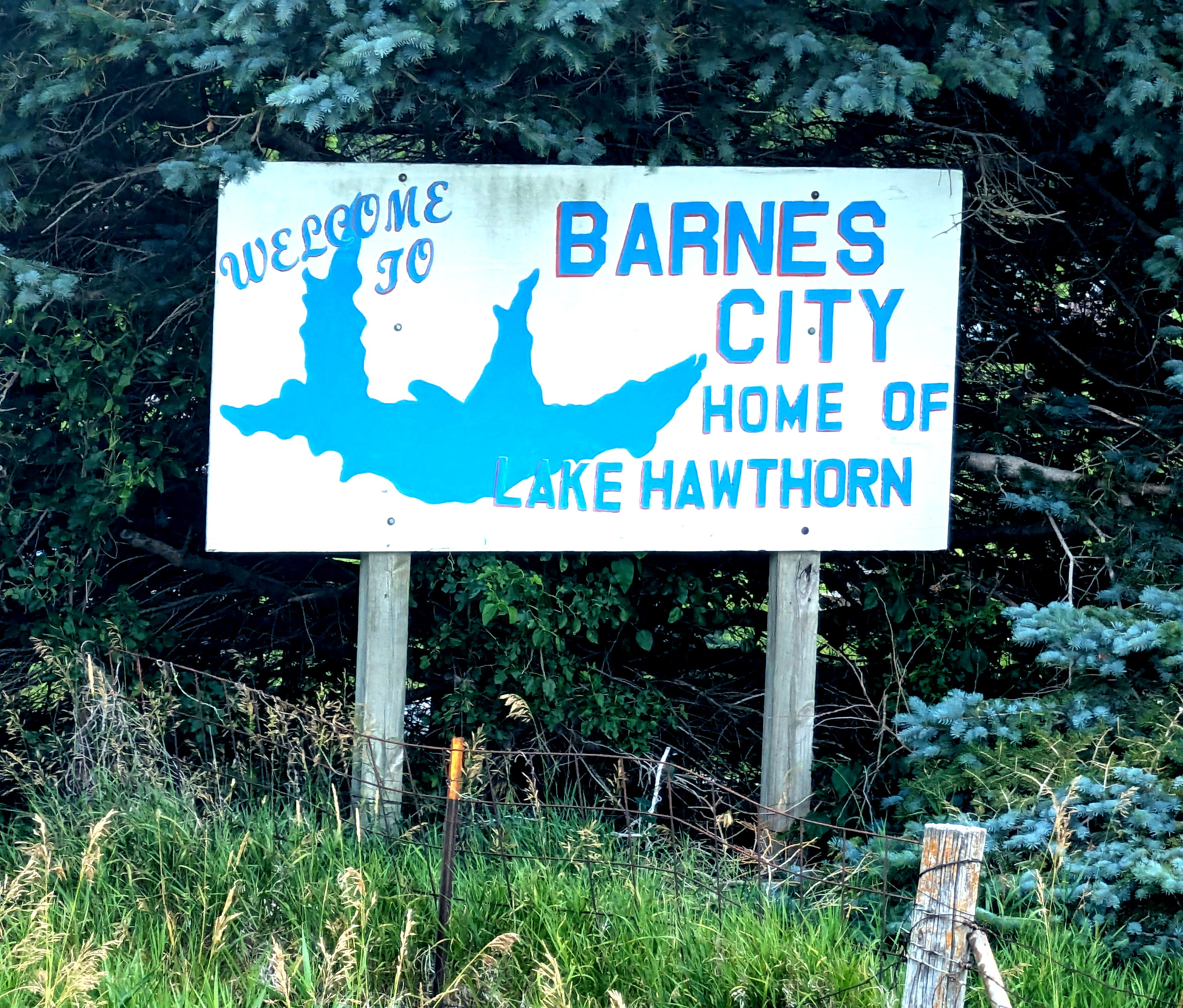
- Barnes City's welcome sign

- Location of Barnes City, Iowa
- Coordinates: 41°30′25″N 92°28′10″W
- Country: United States
- State: Iowa
- Counties: Mahaska, Poweshiek

Government
  - Type: mayor-council
  - mayor: Jeff Innis

Area
  - Total: 0.59 sq mi (1.53 km^{2})
  - Land: 0.59 sq mi (1.53 km^{2})
  - Water: 0 sq mi (0.00 km^{2})
- Elevation: 902 ft (275 m)

Population (2020)
  - Total: 156
  - Density: 264.5/sq mi (102.14/km^{2})
- Time zone: UTC-6 (Central (CST))
  - Summer (DST): UTC-5 (CDT)
- ZIP code: 50027
- Area code: 641
- FIPS code: 19-04555
- GNIS feature ID: 2394064

Barnes City is a city in Mahaska and Poweshiek counties in the U.S. state of Iowa. The population was 156 at the 2020 census.

== History ==
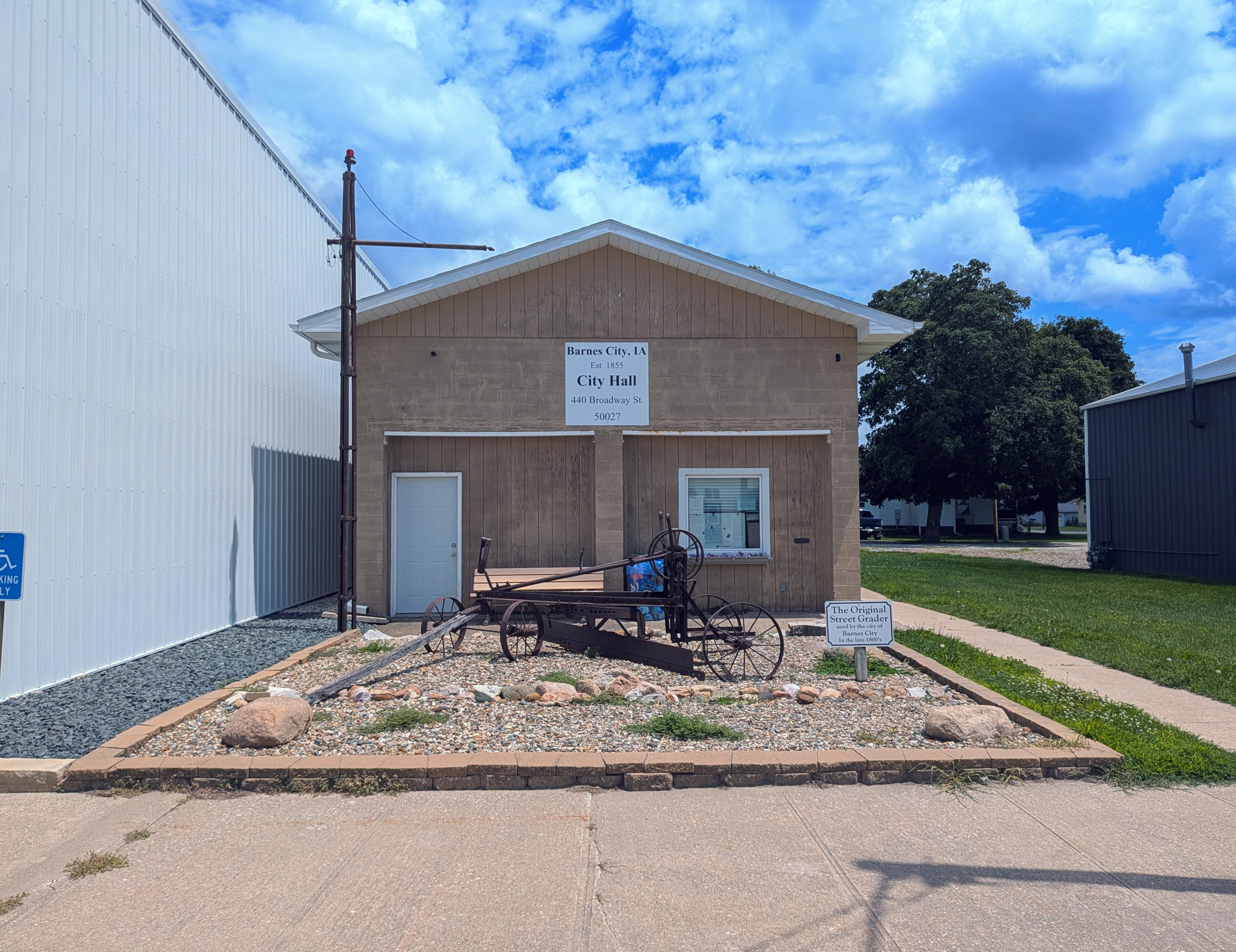
City Hall

Barnes City was founded under the name of New Barnes until the town of Barnes City was chartered in 1898. Barnes City came about as a result of the Chicago, Rock Island, and Pacific Railroad needing a central link between Montezuma and Thornburg. It was decided that a small depot be built halfway in between these two communities, and this happened to be on the property owned by James Barnes in 1881; hence the name Barnes City.

== Geography ==
According to the United States Census Bureau, the city has a total area of 0.59 square miles (1.53 km^{2}), all land.

== Demographics ==
Historical populations
Year	Pop.	±%
1900	274	—
1910	307	+12.0%
1920	473	+54.1%
1930	375	−20.7%
1940	414	+10.4%
1950	326	−21.3%
1960	273	−16.3%
1970	238	−12.8%
1980	266	+11.8%
1990	221	−16.9%
2000	201	−9.0%
2010	176	−12.4%
2020	156	−11.4%
Source:"U.S. Census website". United States Census Bureau. and Iowa Data Center; Source: U.S. Decennial Census

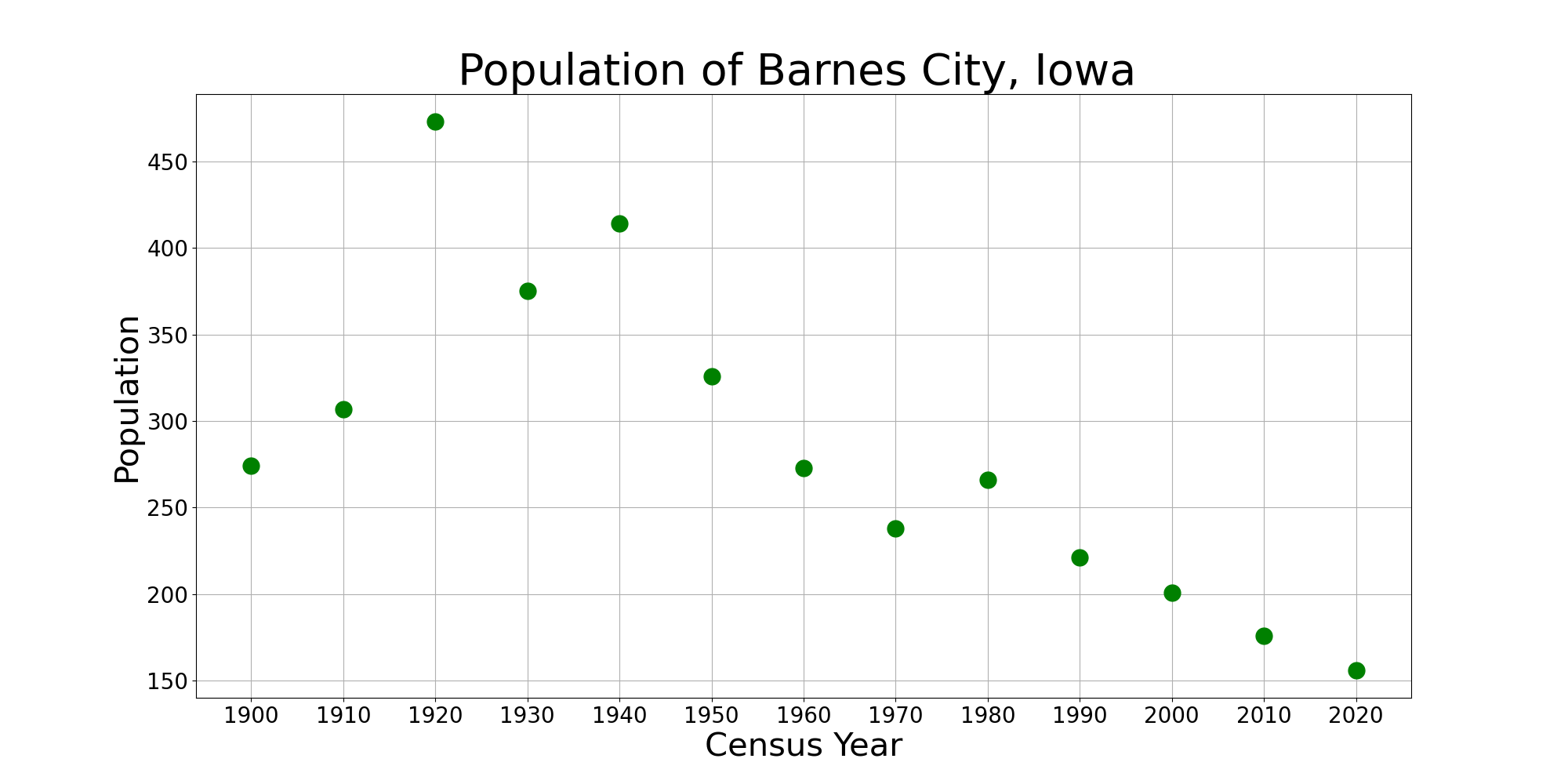
The population of Barnes City, Iowa from US census data

=== 2020 census ===
As of the census of 2020, there were 156 people, 80 households, and 47 families residing in the city. The population density was 264.5 inhabitants per square mile (102.1/km^{2}). There were 89 housing units at an average density of 150.9 per square mile (58.3/km^{2}). The racial makeup of the city was 93.6% White, 0.6% Black or African American, 0.6% Native American, 0.0% Asian, 0.0% Pacific Islander, 0.0% from other races and 5.1% from two or more races. Hispanic or Latino persons of any race comprised 3.2% of the population.

Of the 80 households, 30.0% of which had children under the age of 18 living with them, 43.8% were married couples living together, 10.0% were cohabitating couples, 20.0% had a female householder with no spouse or partner present and 26.2% had a male householder with no spouse or partner present. 41.2% of all households were non-families. 32.5% of all households were made up of individuals, 10.0% had someone living alone who was 65 years old or older.

The median age in the city was 53.7 years. 16.0% of the residents were under the age of 20; 5.8% were between the ages of 20 and 24; 20.5% were from 25 and 44; 31.4% were from 45 and 64; and 26.3% were 65 years of age or older. The gender makeup of the city was 47.4% male and 52.6% female.

=== 2010 census ===
As of the census of 2010, there were 176 people, 88 households, and 47 families living in the city. The population density was 298.3 inhabitants per square mile (115.2/km^{2}). There were 99 housing units at an average density of 167.8 per square mile (64.8/km^{2}). The racial makeup of the city was 99.4% White and 0.6% Native American.

There were 88 households, of which 17.0% had children under the age of 18 living with them, 42.0% were married couples living together, 5.7% had a female householder with no husband present, 5.7% had a male householder with no wife present, and 46.6% were non-families. 40.9% of all households were made up of individuals, and 13.6% had someone living alone who was 65 years of age or older. The average household size was 2.00 and the average family size was 2.68.

The median age in the city was 49.2 years. 17.6% of residents were under the age of 18; 7.4% were between the ages of 18 and 24; 20.4% were from 25 to 44; 34.7% were from 45 to 64; and 19.9% were 65 years of age or older. The gender makeup of the city was 52.3% male and 47.7% female.

=== 2000 census ===
As of the census of 2000, there were 201 people, 92 households, and 50 families living in the city. The population density was 336.1 inhabitants per square mile (129.8/km^{2}). There were 102 housing units at an average density of 170.6 per square mile (65.9/km^{2}). The racial makeup of the city was 99.50% White and 0.50% African American.

There were 92 households, out of which 27.2% had children under the age of 18 living with them, 39.1% were married couples living together, 8.7% had a female householder with no husband present, and 44.6% were non-families. 37.0% of all households were made up of individuals, and 20.7% had someone living alone who was 65 years of age or older. The average household size was 2.18 and the average family size was 2.86.

In the city, the population was spread out, with 25.9% under the age of 18, 6.5% from 18 to 24, 23.4% from 25 to 44, 27.4% from 45 to 64, and 16.9% who were 65 years of age or older. The median age was 40 years. For every 100 females, there were 116.1 males. For every 100 females age 18 and over, there were 104.1 males.

The median income for a household in the city was $29,583, and the median income for a family was $32,321. Males had a median income of $31,250 versus $21,250 for females. The per capita income for the city was $14,135. About 14.0% of families and 20.7% of the population were below the poverty line, including 43.5% of those under the age of eighteen and 5.9% of those 65 or over.

== Education ==
The North Mahaska Community School District operates local public schools. The Montezuma Community School District also operates within the north boundary of the city limits of Barnes City.
