= Deep River–Millersburg Community School District =

Former school district in Iowa

Deep River–Millersburg Community School District (DR-M) was a school district headquartered in Millersburg, Iowa. It served that community and Deep River. It was located in portions of Iowa and Poweshiek counties.

== History ==
It formed in the 1958 consolidation of the Deep River and Millersburg schools. Initially the Millersburg school building housed all levels except grades K–4, which were in Deep River. At a later point upper elementary grades were moved to Deep River.

Secondary enrollment was declining in the period prior to 1992. It closed its junior and senior high school divisions, when it signed a grade-sharing agreement with both the English Valleys Community School District and the Montezuma Community School District; post-1992 its students selected one of two schools for their secondary schooling. The district also closed the Deep River school and consolidated all of its students at Millersburg after deeming the latter to have a superior layout.

On July 1, 2009, the district was consolidated into the English Valleys district, although a portion of it was given to the Montezuma district. English Valleys took possession of the remaining school building in Millersburg and did not immediately decide what to do with it. In December 2009 it remained empty, and there were potential plans to convert the building into transitional housing for poor families or those affected by domestic violence.
