= North Mahaska Community School District =

Public school district in New Sharon, Iowa, United States

Coordinates: 41.460197°N 92.648946°W

Location
- New Sharon, Iowa Mahaska and Poweshiek counties United States
- Coordinates: 41.460197, -92.648946

District information
- Type: Local school district
- Grades: K-12
- Established: 1956
- Superintendent: Angela Livezey
- Schools: 2
- Budget: $8,881,000 (2020-21)
- NCES District ID: 1920850

Students and staff
- Students: 616 (2022-23)
- Teachers: 45.64 FTE
- Staff: 36.02 FTE
- Student–teacher ratio: 13.50
- Athletic conference: South Iowa Cedar League
- District mascot: Warhawks
- Colors: Red and White

Other information
- Website: nmwarhawks.org

North Mahaska Community School District is a rural public school district located in New Sharon, IA. The district is located mainly in Mahaska County, with a small portion in Poweshiek County, and serves the cities of New Sharon, Barnes City, the unincorporated communities of Lacey and Taintor, and the surrounding rural areas.

Angela Livezey has served as superintendent since 2015.

== History ==
The communities of Barnes City, Lacey, Taintor, and New Sharon joined to form North Mahaska Community School in 1956. In 1997, a bond issue was passed to build a new Elementary School. In 1999, a new elementary school was completed which connects to the Jr. and Sr. High School by a hallway. In 2008, the North Mahaska Community School District Early Childhood education center opened, housing the preschool for ages 3 and 4 as well as the Sunshine and Smiles Daycare Center.

== Schools ==
The district operates two schools in a single facility in New Sharon:

- North Mahaska Elementary School
- North Mahaska Jr.-Sr. High School

=== North Mahaska Jr.-Sr. High School ===
==== Athletics ====
The North Mahaska official mascot is the Warhawk and they are a member of the South Iowa Cedar League conference, and participate in the following sports:

- Cross Country
- Volleyball
- Football
  - State Champions - 2005
- Basketball
  - Boys' State Champions - 2005
  - Girls' State Champions - 2012
- Wrestling
- Track and Field
  - Boys' Class 1A State Champions - 1990
- Golf
- Baseball
- Softball

== See also ==
- List of school districts in Iowa
- List of high schools in Iowa
