= English Valleys Community School District =

School district in Iowa, US

Coordinates: 41.513454°N 92.080467°W

Location
- North English, Iowa Iowa, Poweshiek, and Keokuk counties United States
- Coordinates: 41.513454, -92.080467

District information
- Type: Local school district
- Grades: K–12
- Established: 1958
- Superintendent: Mark Olmstead
- Schools: 2
- Budget: $8,641,000 (2020-21)
- NCES District ID: 1910980

Students and staff
- Students: 451 (2022-23)
- Teachers: 34.58 FTE
- Staff: 34.87 FTE
- Student–teacher ratio: 13.04
- Athletic conference: South Iowa Cedar League
- District mascot: Bears
- Colors: Navy and gold

Other information
- Website: www.evbears.com

The English Valleys Community School District – sometimes abbreviated "EV" – is a rural public school district headquartered in North English, Iowa. The district spans areas of southern Iowa, southeastern Poweshiek and northern Keokuk counties, encompassing the communities of North English, Millersburg, South English, Kinross, and a portion of Deep River.

The district's elementary and junior-senior high school campuses are located in North English, with administrative offices located at the elementary building. The district is governed by a five-member board of directors, with all board members voted at-large and meeting monthly. The school district is accredited by the North Central Association of Colleges and Schools and the Iowa Department of Education.

== History ==
The English Valleys Community School District formed in 1958, the result of the merger of several school districts in southern Iowa and northern Keokuk counties: North English, South English, Kinross and Webster.

The Deep River–Millersburg Community School District began a whole-grade sharing program with English Valleys and the Montezuma Community School District in 1992, sending its junior and senior high school students to both secondary schools, with each student choosing which one he/she preferred, while maintaining its elementary school in Millersburg. Deep River–Millersburg, which had been based in Millersburg, consolidated with English Valleys on July 1, 2009, with the elementary building closed and students sent to North English. Some of the territory of Deep River–Millersburg instead went to the Montezuma district.

== Schools ==
The district operates two schools:

- English Valleys Elementary School
- English Valleys Jr/Sr High School

=== English Valleys Jr/Sr High School ===
==== Athletics ====
Athletic teams are known as the Bears, with teams participating in 13 sports in the South Iowa Cedar League.

- Cross Country (boys and girls)
- Volleyball
- Football
- Basketball (boys and girls)
- Wrestling
- Track and Field (boys and girls)
  - 1960 Boys' State Champions
- Golf (boys and girls)
- Baseball (boys)
- Softball (girls)

== See also ==
- List of school districts in Iowa
- List of high schools in Iowa
