= Travis Fiser =

Travis Fiser is an American high school wrestling coach and former collegiate wrestler. He is the head coach at Grundy High School, Grundy, Virginia, and a member of the National Wrestling Hall of Fame.

== Wrestling career ==
Born in Marengo, Iowa, Fiser was a high school wrestler for Iowa Valley High School in Marengo, graduating in 1987. He was an Iowa High School Class 1A State Runner-Up at 167 lbs. In 1987, he continued his wrestling career at Kirkwood Community College in Cedar Rapids, Iowa, where he earned NJCAA All-American Honors in 1989. He then wrestled for wrestling legend Dan Gable at the University of Iowa where he was a two-time NCAA All-American at 190 lbs. He had an NCAA record of 72-26-5, and was a member of two NCAA National Championship teams.

== Coaching career ==
After graduating, Fiser wrestled for Hawkweye Wrestling Club. After a failed bid to make the US Olympic team, he accepted a position as head wrestling coach at Grundy High School in Grundy, VA in 1996, taking over for fellow Hawkeye Kevin Dresser

Fiser led the Virginia powerhouse to four Virginia state titles in five years after taking over the program, and has been at the helm for 17 of Grundy's 28 state team titles:

- Virginia Class AA - 1997, 1998, 2000, 2001
- Virginia Class A - 2012, 2013
- Virginia Class 2A - 2014, 2016, 2017
- Virginia Class 1 - 2018, 2019, 2020, 2021, 2022, 2023, 2024, 2025

More than 100 individual state championship medals have been awarded to Golden Wave wrestlers under Fiser.

He was inducted into the National Wrestling Hall of Fame for Lifetime Service to Wrestling (Virginia) in 2019.

In 2026, he was inducted into the Distinguished Alumni by the Iowa Valley Alumni Association.

== Personal life ==
Travis is married to Jackie. Their oldest child, Gabe, is a four-time high school state wrestling champion in Virginia. They also have a daughter, Alexa.
