= Victor, Iowa =

- City
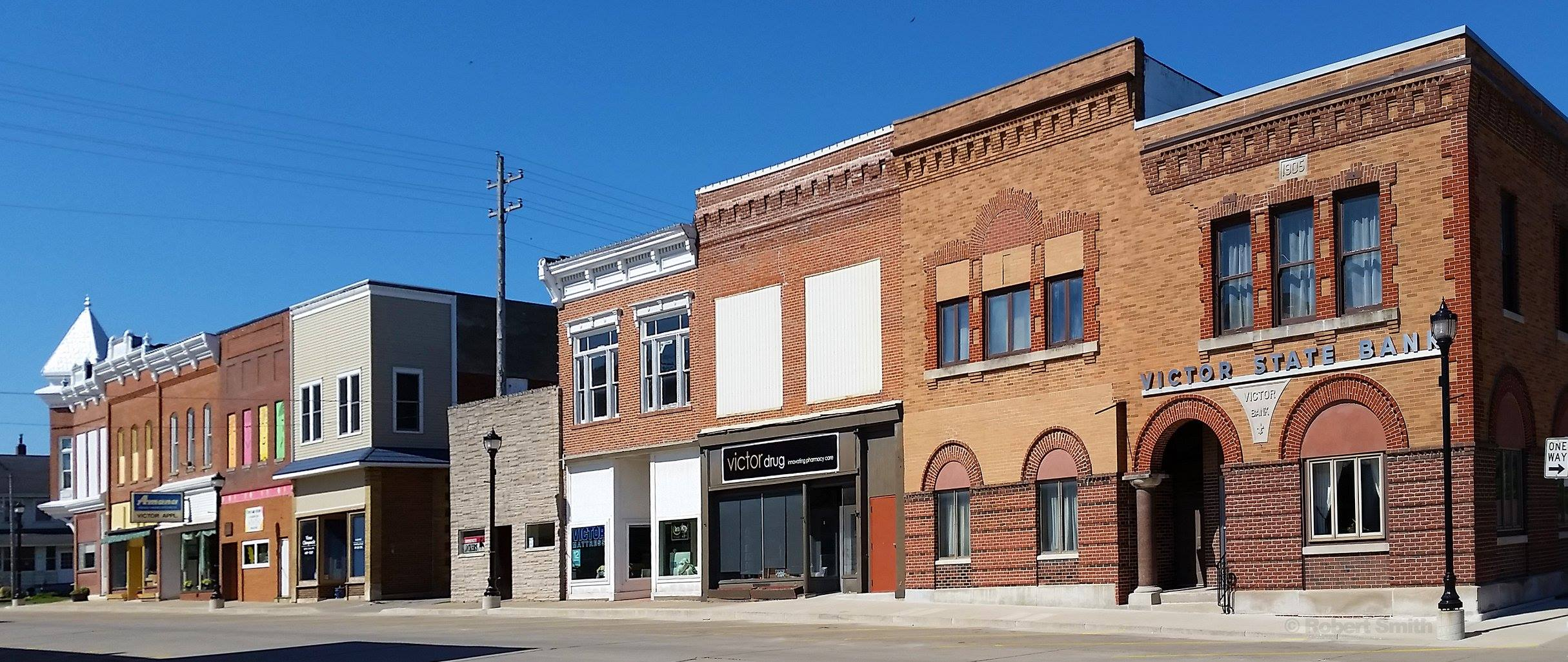
- Storefronts in Victor, Iowa

- Location of Victor, Iowa
- Coordinates: 41°43′50″N 92°17′41″W
- Country: United States
- State: Iowa
- Counties: Iowa, Poweshiek

Area
  - Total: 0.48 sq mi (1.25 km^{2})
  - Land: 0.48 sq mi (1.25 km^{2})
  - Water: 0 sq mi (0.00 km^{2})
- Elevation: 837 ft (255 m)

Population (2020)
  - Total: 875
  - Density: 1,818.3/sq mi (702.06/km^{2})
- Time zone: UTC-6 (Central (CST))
  - Summer (DST): UTC-5 (CDT)
- ZIP code: 52347
- Area code: 319
- FIPS code: 19-80805
- GNIS feature ID: 2397134
- Website: www.cityofvictor.org

Victor is a city in Poweshiek and Iowa counties in the U.S. state of Iowa. The population was 875 in the 2020 census, a decline from the population of 952 in 2000.

== History ==
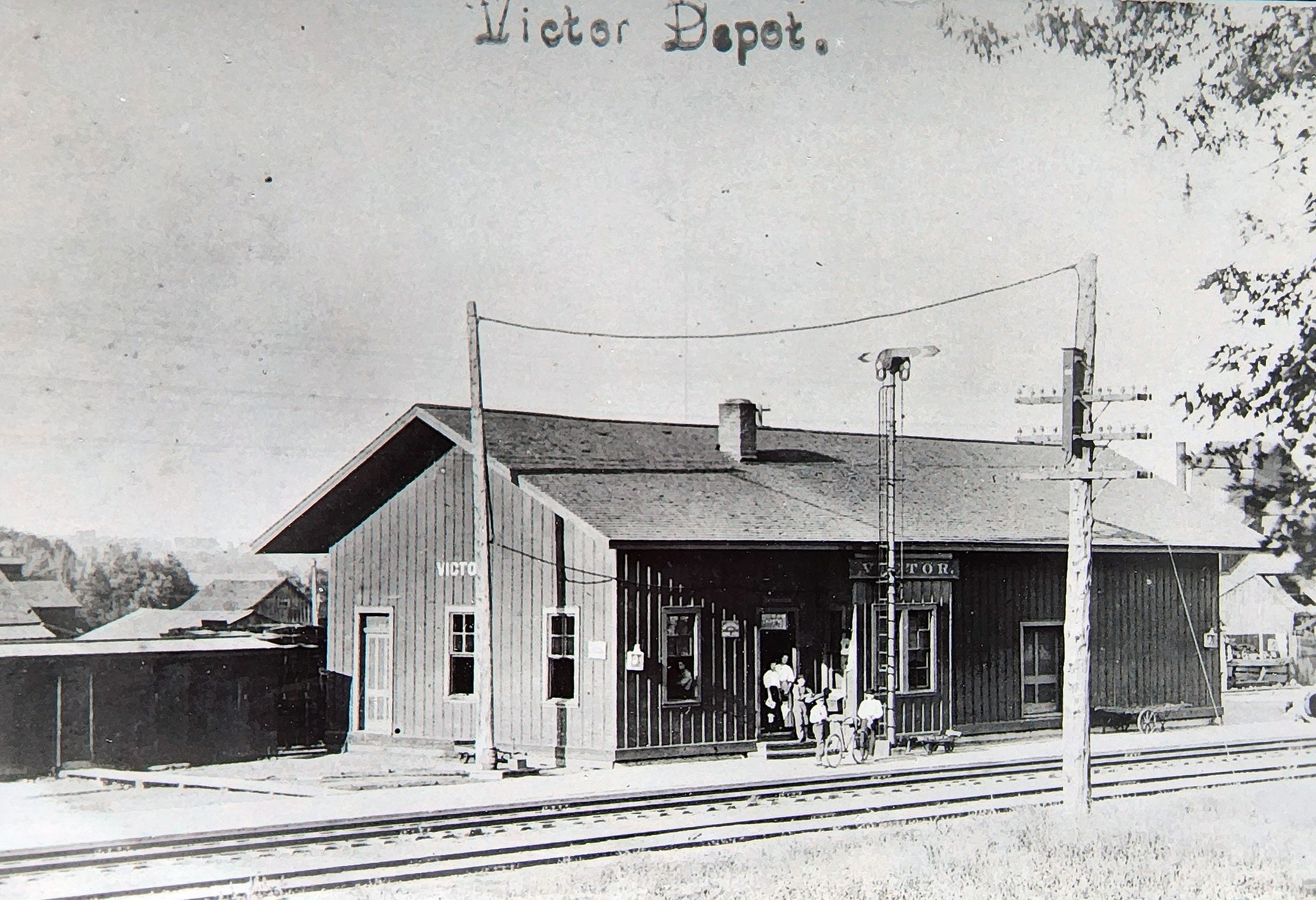
The depot was the first building in what is now Victor - photo c. 1914

Prior to its opening for European settlement, the area around what is now Victor was home to the Sac and Fox Indians.

The Dragoon Trail trail follows the path of the 1st U. S. Dragoons, the country's first mounted infantry unit, on their historic march in the summer of 1835. The purpose of the march was to scout Iowa after the Black Hawk Purchase of 1832. This trail generally followed the Bear Creek Valley in western Iowa County and passed about a mile south of what would later become Victor.

In 1856 and 1857, Mormon Handcart Pioneers followed the Dragoon Trail south of Victor on their way from the end of the rail line in Iowa City to the Salt Lake Valley in Utah. The route was later referred to locally as the "State Road" and today is officially designated by the county as "A Diagonal". Later, until about 1863, Mormon pioneers passed through Victor in covered wagons.

In April 1854, George W. Wilson, a native of Ohio, purchased from the federal government the land on which Victor now occupies.

In October 1861, Wilson permanently moved from Ohio to Iowa and soon began negotiations with Thomas C. Durant of New York City, a railroad officer. The resulting agreement involved granting a right of way through Wilson's land, providing space for a switch yard and station, and building a depot.

Construction of the depot started on November 15, 1861, and was completed by December 24. Materials were sourced partly from Wilson's timber land near Victor, with additional supplies purchased from Davenport and Iowa City. Samuel Howard, the foreman, led the construction with assistance from several workers who prepared and transported the timbers.

The depot was the first building in what would become the town of Victor, laying the foundation for its growth.

May 5, 1863, Joseph A. Blackburn - a brother-in-law of George Wilson - completed the legal steps necessary for the original town of "Wilson", named in honor of the man who entered the land. Another addition was made June 19, 1866, and still another December 20, 1867.

In 1869, following Iowa's general law, the town was incorporated. Under the direction of Wilson and the town was divided into lots by surveyor Charles Stotwell. The town had been originally surveyed just eight years prior to its incorporation.

In July 1854 the first post office in the region was established south of Victor on the State Road and given the name "Victor" after a village in New York. In 1865, the post office was relocated to where the town had been established and the town's name was changed from Wilson to Victor.

A man named McEckley was the first to build a house, store and mill at what is now the site of Victor. The early settlers, primarily of Irish and German descent, came from Ohio, Indiana, and Maryland. Later, Belgian and Czech immigrants arrived.

=== Railroad ===
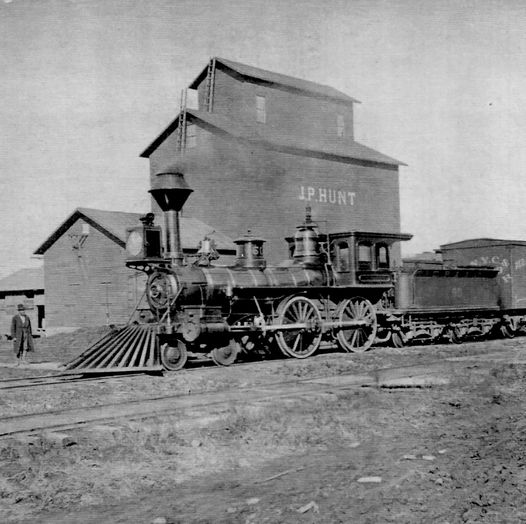
Steam locomotive in front of the first grain elevator in Victor, Iowa.

The first railroad to reach Victor was the Mississippi and Missouri Railroad (M&M Railroad) which arrived in 1862. Chartered in 1853, the M&M was Iowa's first railroad. It was created to connect Davenport on the Mississippi River to Council Bluffs on the Missouri River. It was the first railroad west of the Mississippi to be connected by a bridge to the East and it played a significant role in the development of the first transcontinental railroad.

The Cedar Rapids and Missouri River Railroad, under lease to the Chicago & North Western, however, was the first to actually reach Council Bluffs. Thomas C. Durant, vice president of the Union Pacific Railroad, held stock in both railroads and was accused of corruption in manipulating the railroads' stock prices and operating as a petty tyrant.

The Rock Island Line bought the M&M on July 9, 1866.

== Geography ==
According to the United States Census Bureau, the city has a total area of 0.49 square miles (1.27 km^{2}), all land.

== Demographics ==
Historical population
Census	Pop.	Note	%±
1880	352		—
1890	616		75.0%
1900	612		−0.6%
1910	640		4.6%
1920	802		25.3%
1930	794		−1.0%
1940	763		−3.9%
1950	741		−2.9%
1960	870		17.4%
1970	949		9.1%
1980	1,046		10.2%
1990	966		−7.6%
2000	952		−1.4%
2010	893		−6.2%
2020	875		−2.0%
U.S. Decennial Census

=== 2020 census ===
As of the census of 2020, there were 875 people, 379 households, and 243 families residing in the city. The population density was 1,818.3 inhabitants per square mile (702.1/km^{2}). There were 417 housing units at an average density of 866.6 per square mile (334.6/km^{2}). The racial makeup of the city was 94.9% White, 1.3% Black or African American, 0.3% Native American, 0.2% Asian, 0.0% Pacific Islander, 0.3% from other races and 3.0% from two or more races. Hispanic or Latino persons of any race comprised 1.4% of the population.

Of the 379 households, 27.2% of which had children under the age of 18 living with them, 51.5% were married couples living together, 7.4% were cohabitating couples, 23.0% had a female householder with no spouse or partner present and 18.2% had a male householder with no spouse or partner present. 35.9% of all households were non-families. 31.1% of all households were made up of individuals, 14.8% had someone living alone who was 65 years old or older.

The median age in the city was 41.4 years. 24.7% of the residents were under the age of 20; 5.0% were between the ages of 20 and 24; 22.9% were from 25 and 44; 26.6% were from 45 and 64; and 20.8% were 65 years of age or older. The gender makeup of the city was 50.6% male and 49.4% female.

=== 2010 census ===
As of the census of 2010, there were 893 people, 392 households, and 244 families living in the city. The population density was 1,822.4 inhabitants per square mile (703.6/km^{2}). There were 430 housing units at an average density of 877.6 per square mile (338.8/km^{2}). The racial makeup of the city was 98.1% White, 0.1% African American, 0.3% Asian, 1.3% from other races, and 0.1% from two or more races. Hispanic or Latino of any race were 1.7% of the population.

There were 392 households, of which 29.3% had children under the age of 18 living with them, 51.5% were married couples living together, 6.9% had a female householder with no husband present, 3.8% had a male householder with no wife present, and 37.8% were non-families. 34.2% of all households were made up of individuals, and 16.8% had someone living alone who was 65 years of age or older. The average household size was 2.28 and the average family size was 2.95.

The median age in the city was 41.4 years. 25.3% of residents were under the age of 18; 5.9% were between the ages of 18 and 24; 23% were from 25 to 44; 29.4% were from 45 to 64; and 16.5% were 65 years of age or older. The gender makeup of the city was 50.2% male and 49.8% female.

=== 2000 census ===
As of the census of 2000, there were 952 people, 400 households, and 280 families living in the city. The population density was 2,010.6 inhabitants per square mile (776.3/km^{2}). There were 420 housing units at an average density of 887.0 per square mile (342.5/km^{2}). The racial makeup of the city was 98.84% White, 0.21% African American, 0.53% Asian, 0.11% from other races, and 0.32% from two or more races. Hispanic or Latino of any race were 0.21% of the population.

There were 400 households, out of which 31.8% had children under the age of 18 living with them, 58.5% were married couples living together, 8.0% had a female householder with no husband present, and 30.0% were non-families. 27.3% of all households were made up of individuals, and 16.5% had someone living alone who was 65 years of age or older. The average household size was 2.38 and the average family size was 2.87.

In the city, the population was spread out, with 25.4% under the age of 18, 6.7% from 18 to 24, 24.8% from 25 to 44, 22.5% from 45 to 64, and 20.6% who were 65 years of age or older. The median age was 41 years. For every 100 females, there were 93.1 males. For every 100 females age 18 and over, there were 86.8 males.

The median income for a household in the city was $38,542, and the median income for a family was $47,841. Males had a median income of $33,021 versus $22,000 for females. The per capita income for the city was $18,837. About 4.1% of families and 7.9% of the population were below the poverty line, including 12.0% of those under age 18 and 6.7% of those age 65 or over.

== Notable people ==
- William Lawrence Adrian was a priest in Victor who became Bishop of Nashville
- Ben Beran, born in Victor, is a former basketball player
- Jackie Collum, born in Victor, was a major league pitcher
- John W. Gwynne, born in Victor, was a U.S. Representative
- Leonard Raffensperger, born in Victor, was a University of Iowa football coach
- Albert M. Sackett, born in Victor, was a U.S. admiral

== Education ==
H-L-V Community School District operates area public schools.

== Healthcare ==
Victor area residents have access to healthcare services at the Victor Health Center Clinic, located at 709 Second St. When hospitalization is required the closest and most convenient hospital for residents is Compass Memorial Healthcare, located at 300 West May Street in Marengo, Iowa

== Rolle Bolle ==
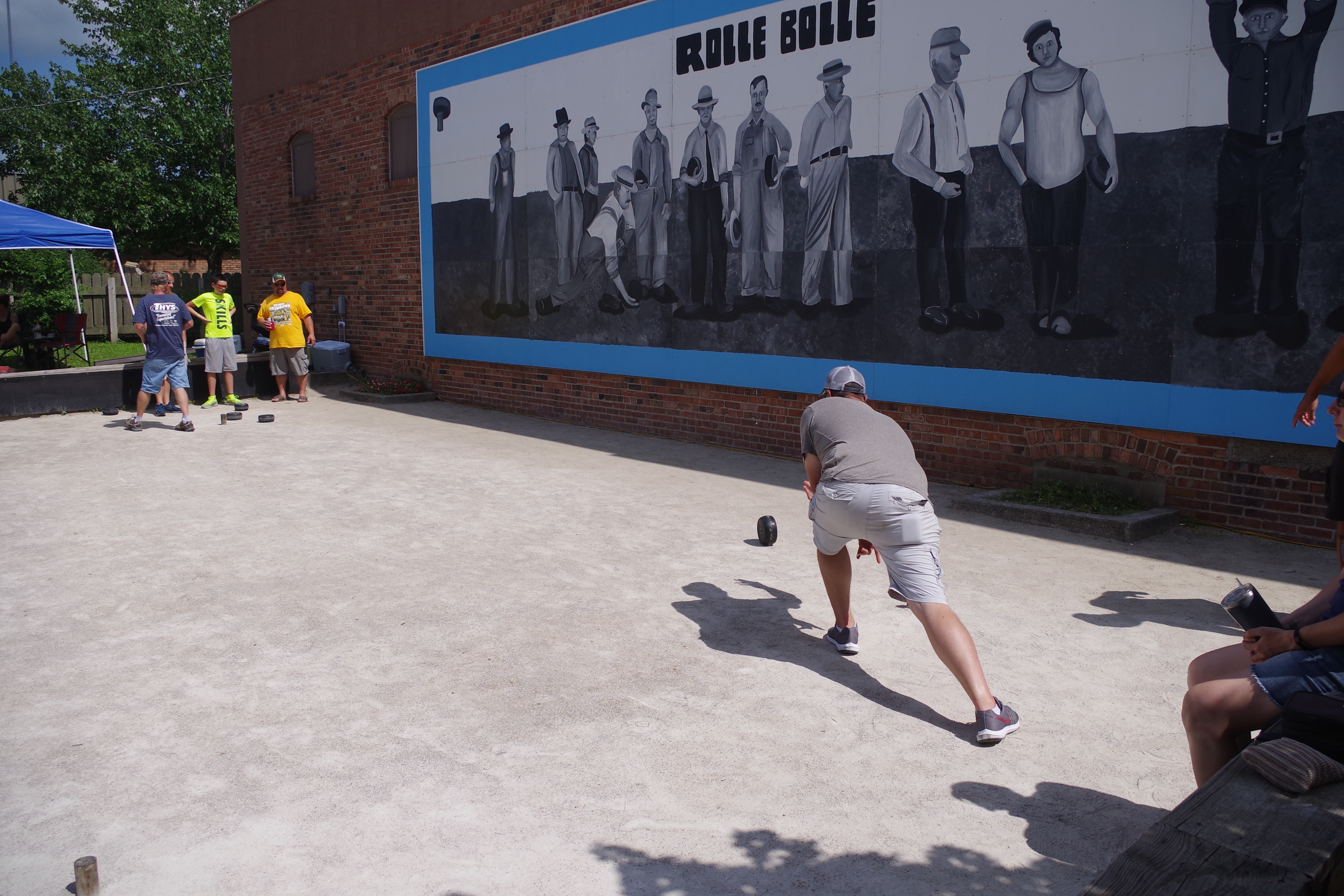
Victor Rolle Bolle Court and Mural

Victor is home to two Rolle Bolle courts, one indoor court at The 214 Bar and Grill and one outdoor court next to the post office. The yard game originated in Belgium (where it is known as krulbollen) and was brought over by Belgian immigrants to the United States in the late 19th and early 20th century. It is still played today by many Victor residents as well as in the nearby towns of Belle Plaine, Clutier, Marengo, Ladora, and Blairstown.

=== Victor Rolle Bolle Mural ===
The Victor Rolle Bolle Mural overlooks Victor's outdoor courts. From 2014 to 2016, about a dozen HLV students used black and white paints to replicate four photos, which they combined into a single image. The completed mural was unveiled during Victor Fun Day, June 25, 2016, just before the start of the tournament. From left to right, the people depicted in the mural are: Bill Stevens, Camiel Holevoet, Cyril Wauters, Julius DeBrower (bolling), Daisken Cornelius, Camiel DeGeeter, Camiel DeHooge, Alfonse Van Gampleare, Daisken Cornelius, John Claeys, Henry Ahrens, and Bob DeWitte.
