= Lynnville–Sully Community School District =

Public school district in Sully, Iowa, United States

Coordinates: 41.581671°N 92.842399°W

Location
- Sully, Iowa Jasper, Poweshiek and Mahaska counties United States
- Coordinates: 41.581671, -92.842399

District information
- Type: Local school district
- Grades: K–12
- Superintendent: Matt Dunsbergen
- Schools: 3
- Budget: $6,996,000 (2020-21)
- NCES District ID: 1918030

Students and staff
- Students: 546 (2022-23)
- Teachers: 41.91 FTE
- Staff: 42.22 FTE
- Student–teacher ratio: 13.03
- Athletic conference: South Iowa Cedar League
- District mascot: Hawks
- Colors: Columbia blue and gold

Other information
- Website: www.lshawks.com

The Lynnville–Sully Community School District is a rural public school district and serves the towns of Lynnville, Sully and Searsboro and surrounding areas in southeastern Jasper and western Poweshiek counties, with a small portion of Mahaska County.

The school, which serves all grade levels pre K–12 in one building, is located at 12476 Highway F62 E, in Sully.

The school's mascot is the Hawk. Their colors are Columbia blue and gold.

== History ==
The independent school district of Lynnville was formed in March 1870.

In 1910, the Lynn Grove township had 22 teachers and an enrollment of 207. Sully had two teachers and an enrollment of 98 pupils.

== Schools ==
- Lynnville–Sully Elementary School
- Lynnville–Sully Middle School
- Lynnville–Sully High School

=== Lynnville–Sully High School ===
==== Athletics ====
The Hawks compete in the South Iowa Cedar League Conference in the following sports.

- Cross country (boys and girls)
  - Girls' state champions - 1995, 1996
- Volleyball (girls)
- Football (boys)
  - State champions - 1986
- Basketball (boys and girls)
  - Girls' state champions - 1997, 1998, 1999
- Wrestling (boys and girls)
- Track and field (boys and girls)
- Golf (boys and girls)
- Baseball (boys)
  - State champions - 1988
- Softball (girls)

== See also ==
- List of school districts in Iowa
- List of high schools in Iowa
