= Sully, Iowa =

- City
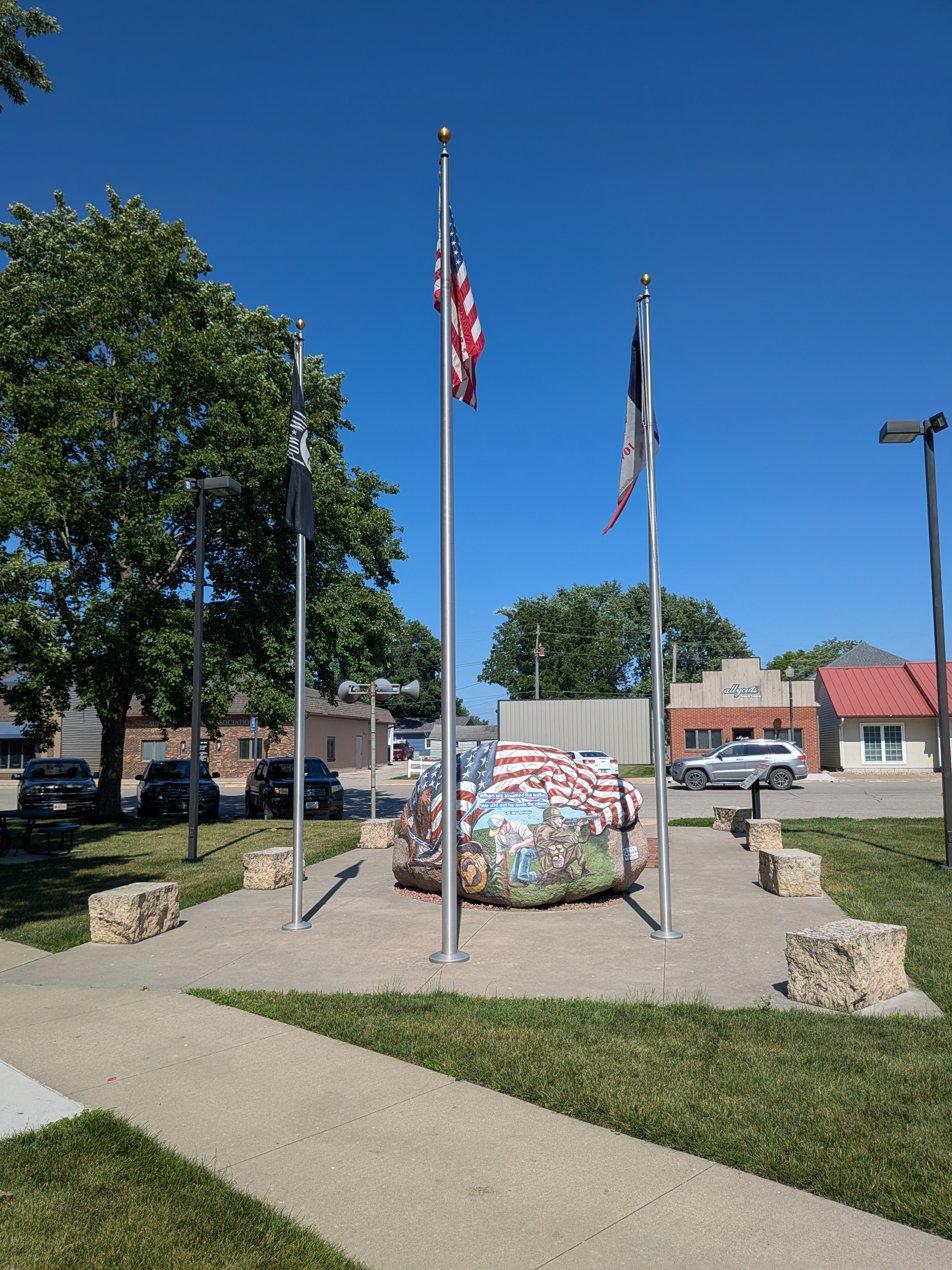
- Jasper County Freedom Rock, in Sully

- Location of Sully, Iowa
- Coordinates: 41°34′43″N 92°50′44″W
- Country: United States
- State: Iowa
- County: Jasper
- Established: 1882

Government
  - Mayor: Brent Vander Molen

Area
  - Total: 0.58 sq mi (1.51 km^{2})
  - Land: 0.58 sq mi (1.51 km^{2})
  - Water: 0 sq mi (0.00 km^{2})
- Elevation: 920 ft (280 m)

Population (2020)
  - Total: 881
  - Density: 1,512.7/sq mi (584.06/km^{2})
- Time zone: UTC-6 (Central (CST))
  - Summer (DST): UTC-5 (CDT)
- ZIP code: 50251
- Area code: 641
- FIPS code: 19-76035
- GNIS feature ID: 0462071
- Website: Welcome to Sully

Sully is a city located in Jasper County, Iowa, United States, named after railroad man Alfred Sully. The population was 881 at the time of the 2020 census.

== History ==
Sully was platted in 1882. The community was incorporated in 1901. It is located on the Diamond Trail, an historic auto trail between Des Moines and Iowa City.

=== Historical infrastructure ===
The Sully Telephone Association was organized in 1903 and incorporated on May 4, 1904. Locally owned by shareholder-members of its community, Sully Telephone Association serves the town of Sully, Iowa and surrounding areas.

Sully no longer has railroad service. At one time, it served as a depot point for a branch line of the Minneapolis & St. Louis Railroad.

== Geography ==
Sully is located at 41°34′43″N 92°50′44″W (41.578638, -92.845441).

According to the United States Census Bureau, the city has a total area of 0.58 square miles (1.50 km^{2}), all land.

The community is south of Interstate 80.

== Demographics ==
Historical populations
Year	Pop.	±%
1910	282	—
1920	393	+39.4%
1930	362	−7.9%
1940	402	+11.0%
1950	452	+12.4%
1960	508	+12.4%
1970	685	+34.8%
1980	828	+20.9%
1990	841	+1.6%
2000	904	+7.5%
2010	821	−9.2%
2020	881	+7.3%
Source:"U.S. Census website". United States Census Bureau. and Iowa Data Center; Source: U.S. Decennial Census

=== 2020 census ===
As of the census of 2020, there were 881 people, 352 households, and 250 families residing in the city. The population density was 1,512.7 inhabitants per square mile (584.1/km^{2}). There were 363 housing units at an average density of 623.3 per square mile (240.7/km^{2}). The racial makeup of the city was 96.0% White, 0.0% Black or African American, 0.7% Native American, 0.3% Asian, 0.0% Pacific Islander, 0.2% from other races and 2.7% from two or more races. Hispanic or Latino persons of any race comprised 0.6% of the population.

Of the 352 households, 30.1% of which had children under the age of 18 living with them, 64.8% were married couples living together, 2.8% were cohabitating couples, 19.3% had a female householder with no spouse or partner present and 13.1% had a male householder with no spouse or partner present. 29.0% of all households were non-families. 26.7% of all households were made up of individuals, 13.9% had someone living alone who was 65 years old or older.

The median age in the city was 38.9 years. 29.4% of the residents were under the age of 20; 3.7% were between the ages of 20 and 24; 23.5% were from 25 and 44; 23.5% were from 45 and 64; and 19.9% were 65 years of age or older. The gender makeup of the city was 49.0% male and 51.0% female.

=== 2010 census ===
As of the census of 2010, there were 821 people, 334 households, and 257 families living in the city. The population density was 1,415.5 inhabitants per square mile (546.5/km^{2}). There were 358 housing units at an average density of 617.2 per square mile (238.3/km^{2}). The racial makeup of the city was 99.6% White, 0.2% African American, and 0.1% Asian. Hispanic or Latino of any race were 0.2% of the population.

There were 334 households, of which 28.1% had children under the age of 18 living with them, 71.9% were married couples living together, 3.9% had a female householder with no husband present, 1.2% had a male householder with no wife present, and 23.1% were non-families. 21.6% of all households were made up of individuals, and 13.5% had someone living alone who was 65 years of age or older. The average household size was 2.46 and the average family size was 2.87.

The median age in the city was 45.1 years. 24.1% of residents were under the age of 18; 6.7% were between the ages of 18 and 24; 19.1% were from 25 to 44; 29.9% were from 45 to 64; and 20.3% were 65 years of age or older. The gender makeup of the city was 50.2% male and 49.8% female.

=== 2000 census ===
As of the census of 2000, there were 904 people, 348 households, and 271 families living in the city. The population density was 1,736.5 inhabitants per square mile (670.5/km^{2}). There were 360 housing units at an average density of 691.5 per square mile (267.0/km^{2}). The racial makeup of the city was 99.78% White and 0.22% Asian.

There were 348 households, out of which 36.2% had children under the age of 18 living with them, 71.8% were married couples living together, 3.4% had a female householder with no husband present, and 22.1% were non-families. 21.0% of all households were made up of individuals, and 14.1% had someone living alone who was 65 years of age or older. The average household size was 2.60 and the average family size was 3.03.

28.5% were under the age of 18, 6.3% from 18 to 24, 26.2% from 25 to 44, 18.9% from 45 to 64, and 20.0% were 65 years of age or older. The median age was 39 years. For every 100 females, there were 94.4 males. For every 100 females age 18 and over, there were 93.4 males.

The median income for a household in the city was $47,344, and the median income for a family was $54,018. Males had a median income of $36,563 versus $25,446 for females. The per capita income for the city was $19,506. About 1.1% of families and 1.9% of the population were below the poverty line, including 0.7% of those under age 18 and 2.2% of those age 65 or over.

== Culture ==
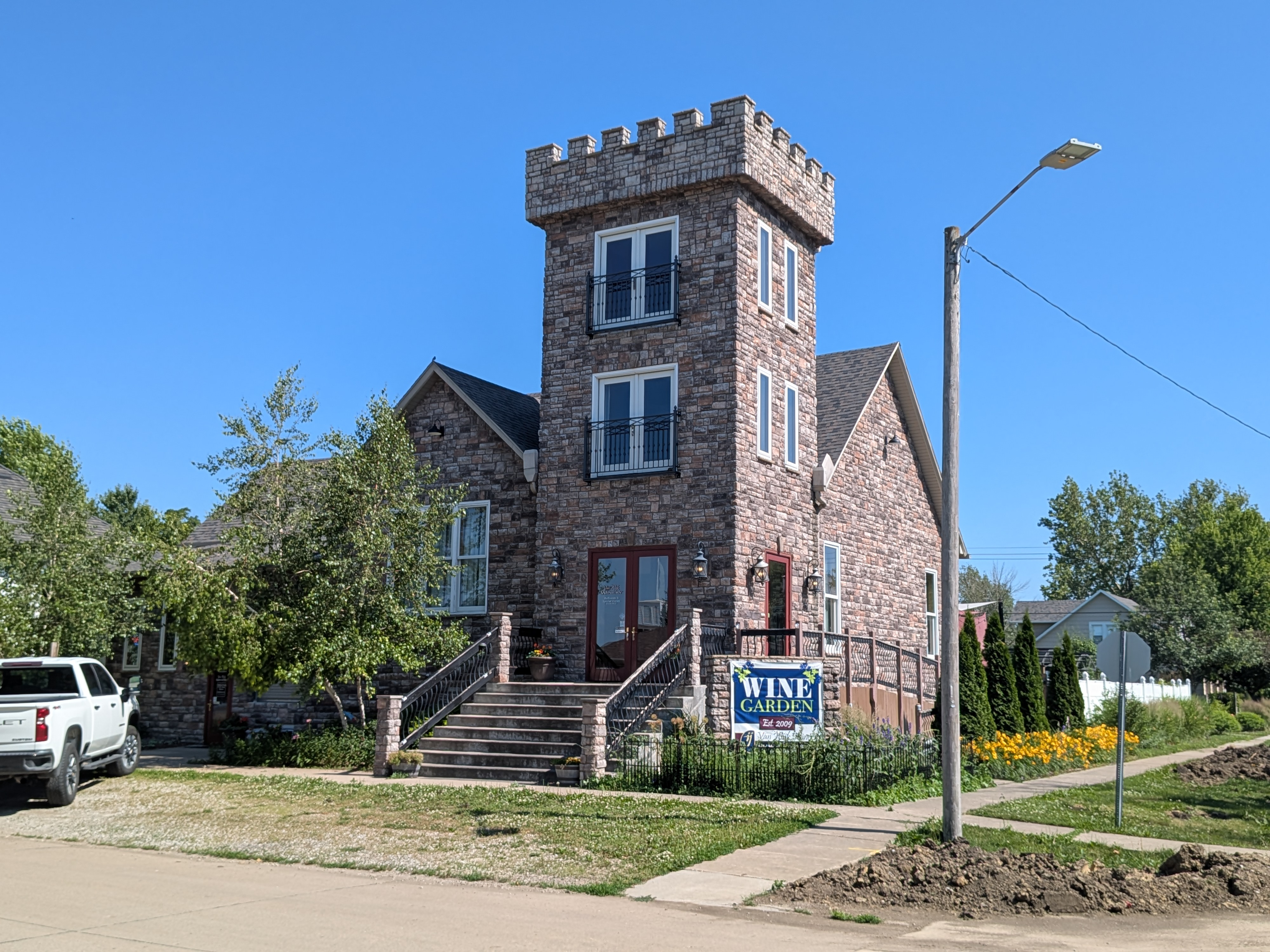
Van Wijk Winery in Sully

=== Churches and denominations ===
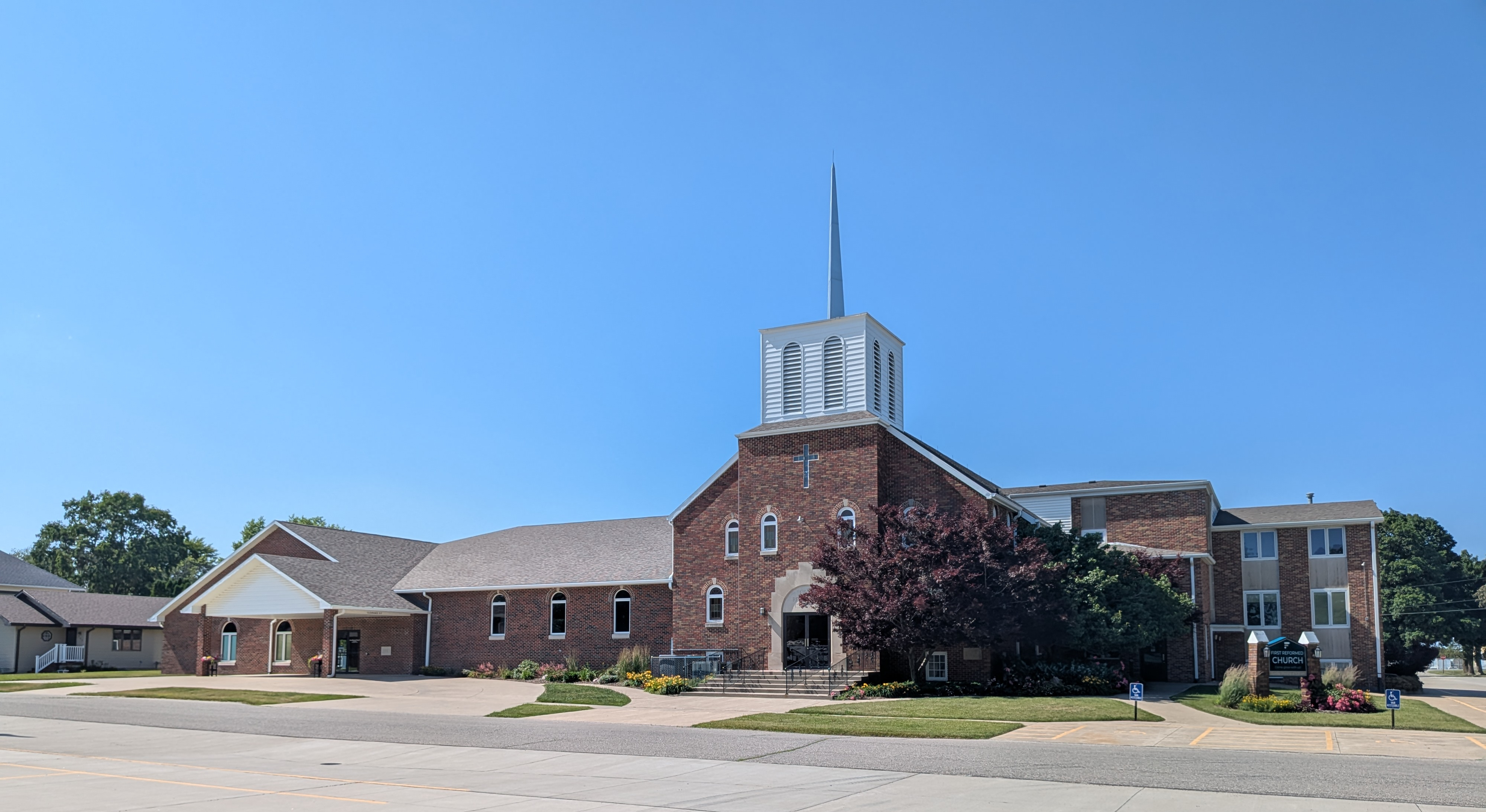
First Reformed Church

Sully hosts three churches. The Sully Christian Reformed Church, the Sully First Reformed Church, and the Sully Community Church, all mid-sized, fully staffed churches, are located within close proximity of the town square. Each congregation offers Sunday and mid-week services as well as weekly Bible study groups, classes for children, youth group activities, and missions work opportunities.

=== Clubs and organizations ===
- The L-S Citizens' Scholarship Foundation is an organization that provides financial assistance to graduating seniors of Lynnville-Sully Community Schools, who plan to continue their education. The chapter is 14 years old and is affiliated with the national non-profit organization "Citizens' Scholarship Foundation of America". It operates with volunteer, non-salaried school district citizens. It is an incorporated, non-profit, tax-exempt organization.
- The Sully Lions Club (District 9MC) was chartered September 15, 1053. Club members converted a closed alley in Sully to a beautiful park called the "Lions Club Courtyard". It includes the old city fire bell, a picnic table, and several benches.
- The Garden Thyme Club was organized in August 1998 by a group of ladies with a common interest. This club meets monthly and is made up of local persons who enjoy flowers, gardening and the camaraderie of friends. The club has held various fundraisers over the years such as garden tours, a garden gate auction and a “picnic in the park” to support various community projects; the most recent project being the purchase of banners for the street light poles around the town square. However, the primary focus of the Garden Thyme Club is the ongoing care and maintenance of the historic Deep Rock Station and Gardens located on the northeast corner of the town square.

=== Community Center ===
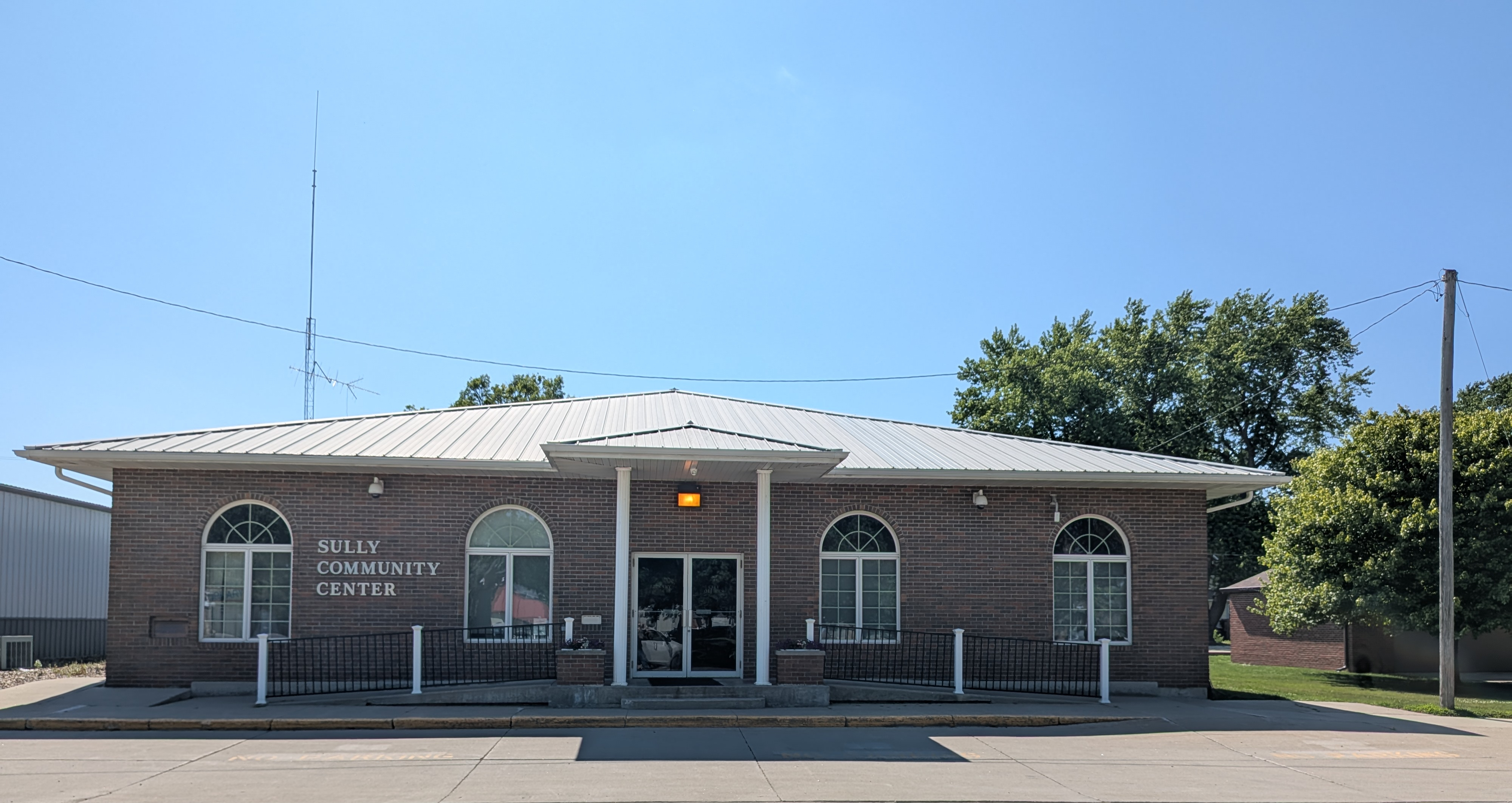
Sully Community Center

The Community Center main room is 50’x60’ in size and will accommodate seating for approximately 225 people and includes a full-size kitchen with serving windows. Serving trays, coffee makers, table service, drink coolers, tables, chairs and a p.a. system are all available for use with the rental fee. A television equipped with video tape and DVD players is also available for use upon request.

=== Historic preservation ===
- Sully Development, Inc was formed in April, 1969 and is a for profit corporation organized by several community organizations and individuals in the community of Sully. The purpose of Sully Development is to improve the quality of life through community betterment.
- The Hometown Press newspaper includes a print shop located on the square in Sully, Iowa. The Hometown Press is a newspaper that continually archives local activities and area news. Its news crosses Jasper, Mahaska, Marion, and Poweshiek Counties and includes community news, sports coverage, feature articles, school news, local classifieds and ads, business and city updates, a cooking column, and more.

=== Parks and recreation ===
- Sully contains two public parks. The city park is located in the city square and has many large trees, a rose garden, gazebo and playground area. The ball park is located on the east end of town and has two softball diamonds, concession stand, one enclosed and two open shelter houses, restroom facilities and playground area.
- The Diamond Trail Fitness Center includes exercise equipment and classes, and provides 24 hour access for members.
- The nearby Diamond Trail Golf Club, established in 1997, is a 9 hole, par 36 golf course. It is tucked in the rolling hills of Lynnville, which is 4 miles east of Sully. There are concrete cart paths the entire length of the course, permitting play rain or shine. The course's irrigation system enables the course's tees, fairways and greens to be maintained in top playing condition.

=== Sports ===
- The Lynnville-Sully Community Schools participate in the South Iowa Cedar League, and are served by both girls and boys soccer coops (as PCM).
- Youth programs include wrestling, volleyball, soccer, Little League, and football.

== Economy ==
Larger employers within this community are:

- Co-Line Welding, Inc.
- Janco Industries, Inc.

== Education ==
- Sully is served by the Lynnville–Sully Community School District. It was Founded: 1956-57 (consolidation of Lynnville and Sully), and consists of two elementary schools 1) Lynnville-Sully Community School (K-8) and 2) Sully Christian Grade School (K-8), a middle school (6-8), and a high school (9-12).
- Sully is also served by two preschools: 1) Inspirations Child Care and Preschool Center, and 2) The Diamond Trail Children's Center.
- The Sully Community Library is located in the Community Center.

== Government and current elected officials ==
Sully is administered by a mayor and a six-person city council. The United States Postal Service operates the Sully Post Office (zip code: 50251).

=== Mayor ===
The mayor of Sully is Brent Vander Molen.

== Healthcare ==
When hospitalization is required, the closest and most convenient hospitals from Sully are:

- Grinnell Regional Medical Center, located at 210 4th Avenue in Grinnell, IA (23 min)
- MercyOne Newton Medical Center, located at 204 N 4th Ave E in Newton, IA (25 min)
- Pella Regional Health Center, located at 404 Jefferson St in Pella, IA (25 min)

== Transportation ==
=== Highways ===
Iowa Highway CR T22 south runs from US Interstate 80 and crosses CR F62 east through Sully.

=== Air Service ===
The Sully Municipal Airport is a general aviation airport with a runway length of 2300 turf feet and is classified as a Category A airport. Approximately 500 operations (take offs and landings) take place at the Sully Municipal Airport in one year. Activities include flight instruction and visiting aircraft.
