= Montezuma Community School District =

Public school district in Montezuma, Iowa, United States

Coordinates: 41.590804°N 92.525311°W

Location
- Montezuma, Iowa Powesheik County United States
- Coordinates: 41.590804, -92.525311

District information
- Type: Local school district
- Grades: K–12
- Superintendent: Rich Schulte
- Schools: 3
- Budget: $8,811,000 (2020-21)
- NCES District ID: 1919590

Students and staff
- Students: 493 (2022-23)
- Teachers: 42.69 FTE
- Staff: 34.58 FTE
- Student–teacher ratio: 11.55
- Athletic conference: South Iowa Cedar League
- District mascot: Braves
- Colors: Blue and white

Other information
- Website: www.montezuma-schools.org

The Montezuma Community School District is a rural public school district that serves the town of Montezuma, Iowa, and surrounding areas in southern Poweshiek County, including much of Deep River.

The school's mascot is the Braves. Their colors are blue and white.

== History ==
In 1992, the Deep River–Millersburg Community School District (DR-M) closed its secondary school and established a whole grade-sharing program with both the Montezuma Community School District and the English Valleys Community School District. Secondary students from DR-M chose which school district they wished to attend for junior and senior high school.

On July 1, 2009, the DR-M was consolidated into the English Valleys Community School District, although a portion of it was split to the Montezuma Community School District.

== Schools ==
The district operated three schools in one building at 504 N 4th Street in Montezuma.

- Montezuma Elementary School
- Montezuma Junior High School
- Montezuma High School

=== Montezuma High School ===
==== Athletics ====
The Braves compete in the South Iowa Cedar League Conference in the following sports:

- Cross Country (boys and girls)
- Volleyball
- Football
- Basketball (boys and girls)
  - Boys' State Champions - 1971, 1990, 2021
  - Girls' State Champions - 1969, 1970
- Wrestling
- Track and Field (boys and girls)
- Golf (boys and girls)
- Baseball
- Softball

== See also ==
- List of school districts in Iowa
- List of high schools in Iowa
