= Marengo, Iowa =

- City
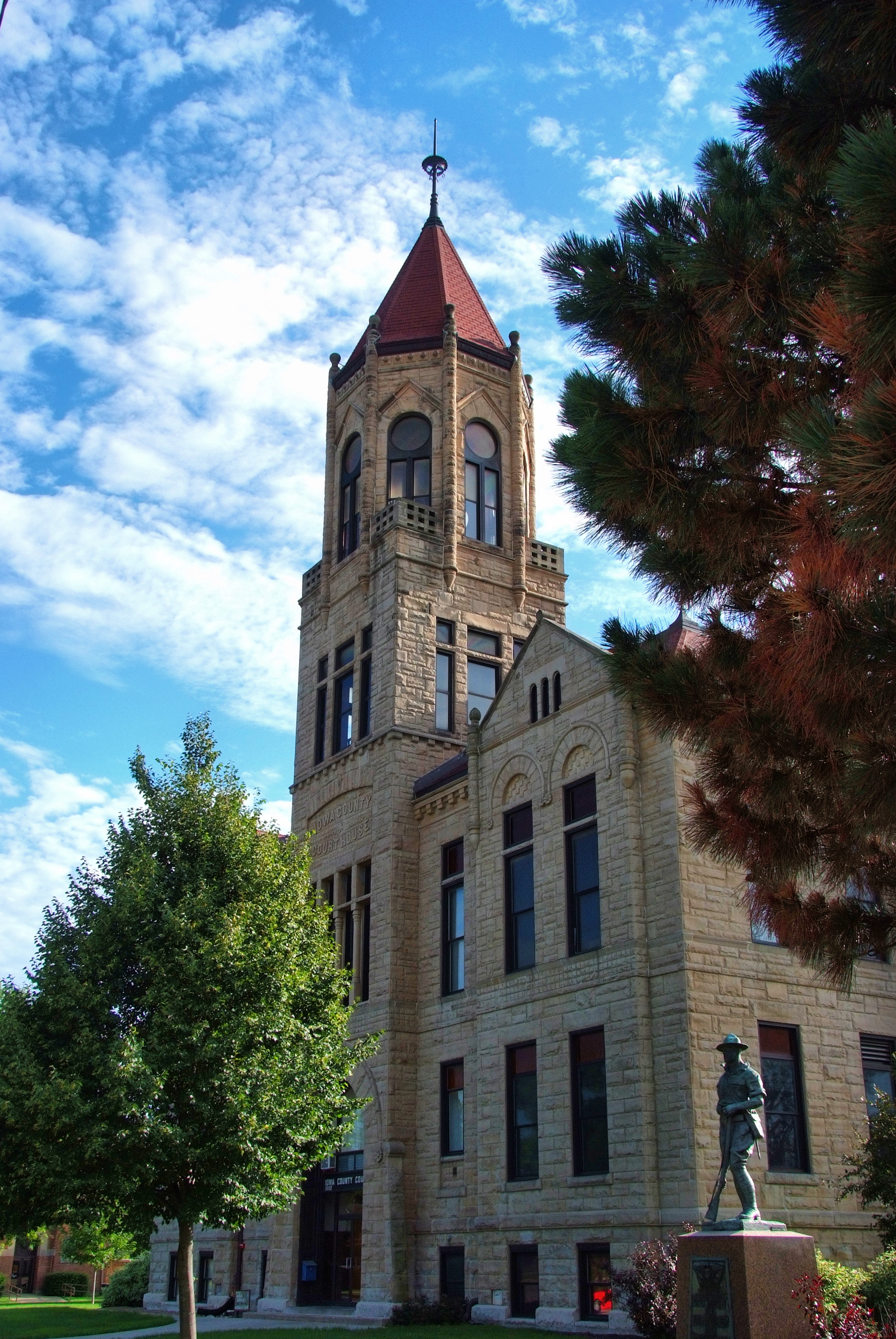
- Iowa County Courthouse
- Motto: "Our town make it yours"
- Location of Marengo, Iowa
- Coordinates: 41°47′46″N 92°04′03″W
- Country: United States
- State: Iowa
- County: Iowa

Area
  - Total: 2.18 sq mi (5.64 km^{2})
  - Land: 2.12 sq mi (5.48 km^{2})
  - Water: 0.062 sq mi (0.16 km^{2})
- Elevation: 738 ft (225 m)

Population (2020)
  - Total: 2,435
  - Density: 1,151.2/sq mi (444.47/km^{2})
- Time zone: UTC-6 (Central (CST))
  - Summer (DST): UTC-5 (CDT)
- ZIP code: 52301
- Area code: 319
- FIPS code: 19-49395
- GNIS feature ID: 2395005
- Website: www.marengoiowa.com

Marengo is a city in and the county seat of Iowa County, Iowa, United States. It has served as the county seat since August 1845, even though it was not incorporated until July 1859. The population was 2,435 in the 2020 census, a decline from 2,535 in 2000.

== History ==
Marengo was laid out in 1845 and platted in 1847. The city's name commemorates the Battle of Marengo, where Napoleon defeated the Austrian army.

The Iowa County Courthouse, built in 1893, is on the National Register of Historic Places.

In 1859, abolitionist John Brown led a group of escaped slaves from Missouri to Michigan. On February 20, the group stayed at the Draper B. Reynolds Farm 1.5 miles south of Marengo.

An explosion at the C6-Zero alternative fuel production plant resulted in a fire and multiple injuries December 2022, prompting the city to urge residents to evacuate and avoid the area until the toxic smoke cleared.

== Geography ==
According to the United States Census Bureau, the city has a total area of 2.14 square miles (5.54 km^{2}), of which 2.08 square miles (5.39 km^{2}) is land and 0.06 square miles (0.16 km^{2}) is water.

The Iowa River passes north of town.

== Demographics ==
Historical population
| Census | Pop. | Note | %± |
|---|---|---|---|
| 1850 | 50 | | — |
| 1870 | 1,693 | | — |
| 1880 | 1,738 | | 2.7% |
| 1890 | 1,710 | | −1.6% |
| 1900 | 2,007 | | 17.4% |
| 1910 | 1,786 | | −11.0% |
| 1920 | 2,048 | | 14.7% |
| 1930 | 2,112 | | 3.1% |
| 1940 | 2,260 | | 7.0% |
| 1950 | 2,151 | | −4.8% |
| 1960 | 2,264 | | 5.3% |
| 1970 | 2,235 | | −1.3% |
| 1980 | 2,308 | | 3.3% |
| 1990 | 2,270 | | −1.6% |
| 2000 | 2,535 | | 11.7% |
| 2010 | 2,528 | | −0.3% |
| 2020 | 2,435 | | −3.7% |
U.S. Decennial Census

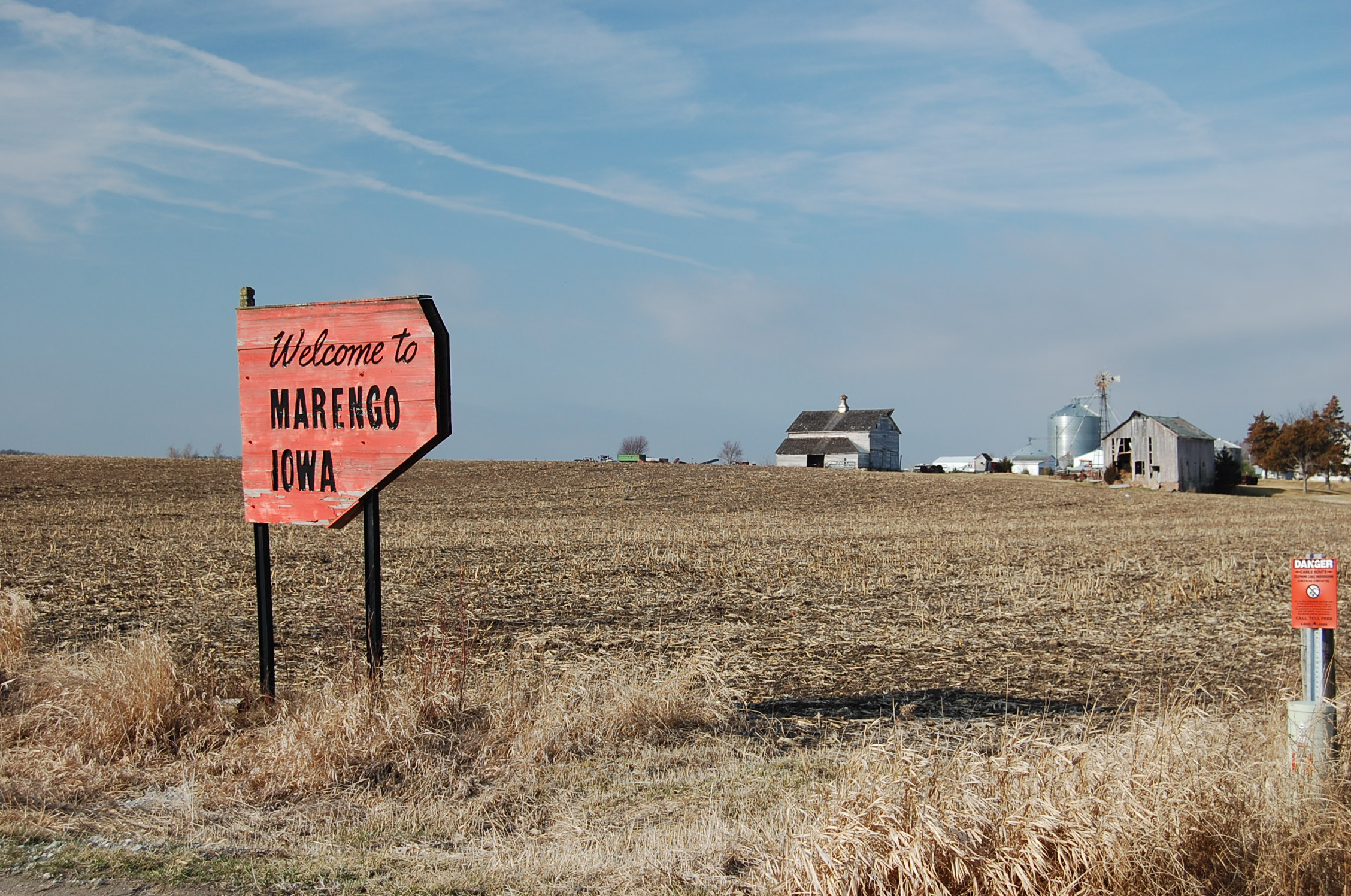
Sign entering Marengo

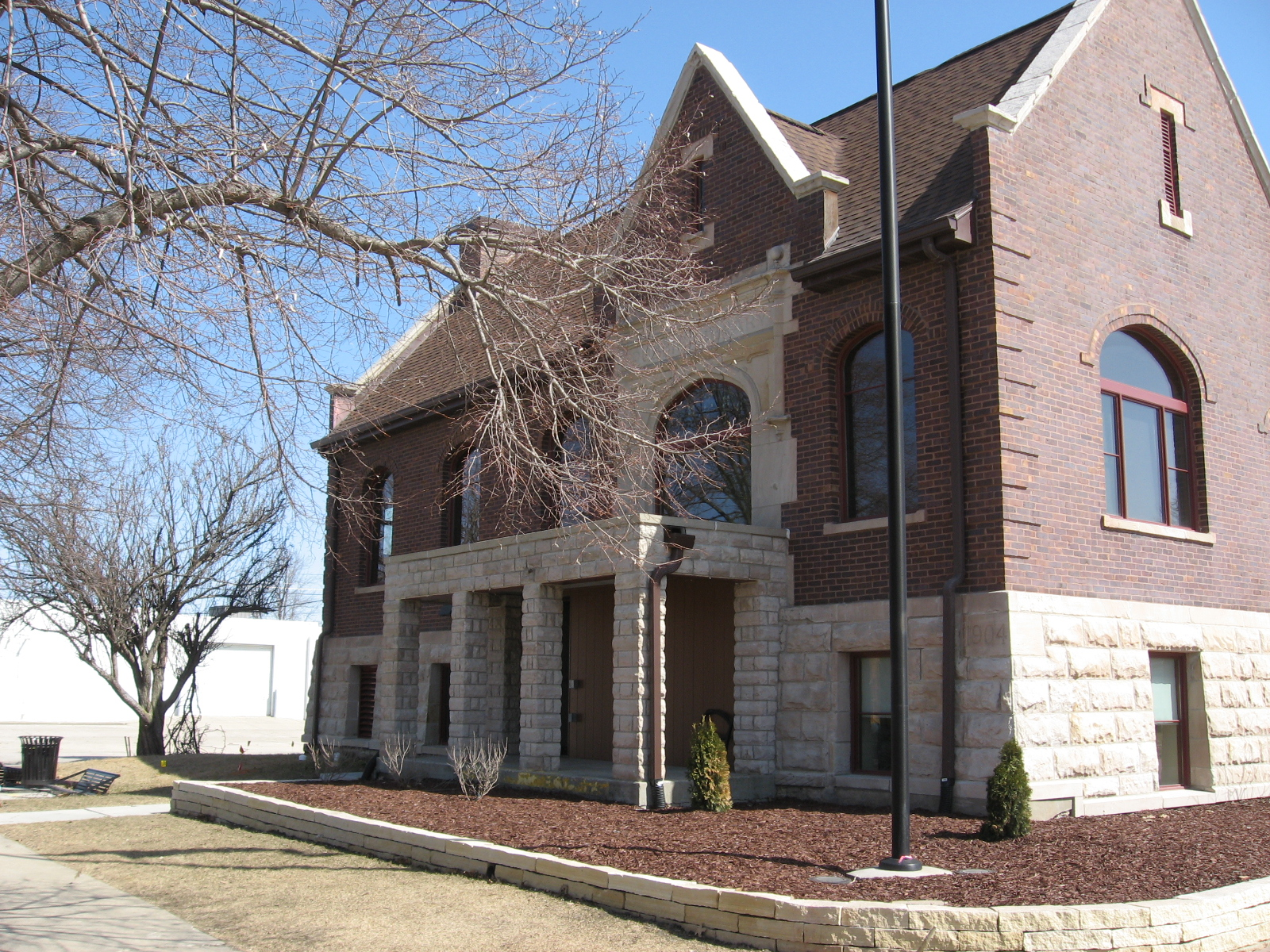
Marengo Public Library

=== 2020 census ===
As of the 2020 census, there were 2,435 people, 1,057 households, and 615 families residing in the city. The population density was 1,151.2 inhabitants per square mile (444.5/km^{2}), and there were 1,147 housing units at an average density of 542.3 per square mile (209.4/km^{2}).

The median age was 41.7 years. 22.8% of residents were under the age of 18. 24.8% of residents were under the age of 20; 5.8% were between the ages of 20 and 24; 22.8% were from 25 to 44; 25.5% were from 45 to 64; and 21.1% were 65 years of age or older. The gender makeup of the city was 48.5% male and 51.5% female. For every 100 females there were 94.3 males, and for every 100 females age 18 and over there were 89.9 males age 18 and over.

Of the 1,057 households, 26.7% had children under the age of 18 living with them. 41.4% were married-couple households, 7.8% were cohabiting couple households, 30.8% were households with a female householder and no spouse or partner present, and 20.0% were households with a male householder and no spouse or partner present. 41.8% of all households were non-families; 35.1% were made up of individuals, and 16.8% had someone living alone who was 65 years of age or older.

Of all housing units, 7.8% were vacant. The homeowner vacancy rate was 2.2% and the rental vacancy rate was 9.8%.

0.0% of residents lived in urban areas, while 100.0% lived in rural areas.

Racial composition as of the 2020 census
| Race | Number | Percent |
|---|---|---|
| White | 2,273 | 93.3% |
| Black or African American | 6 | 0.2% |
| American Indian and Alaska Native | 3 | 0.1% |
| Asian | 11 | 0.5% |
| Native Hawaiian and Other Pacific Islander | 0 | 0.0% |
| Some other race | 28 | 1.1% |
| Two or more races | 114 | 4.7% |
| Hispanic or Latino (of any race) | 99 | 4.1% |

=== 2010 census ===
As of the census of 2010, there were 2,528 people, 1,059 households, and 648 families living in the city. The population density was 1,215.4 inhabitants per square mile (469.3/km^{2}). There were 1,154 housing units at an average density of 554.8 per square mile (214.2/km^{2}). The racial makeup of the city was 97.3% White, 0.6% African American, 0.6% Native American, 0.4% Asian, 0.4% from other races, and 0.7% from two or more races. Hispanic or Latino of any race were 2.8% of the population.

There were 1,059 households, of which 30.5% had children under the age of 18 living with them, 45.2% were married couples living together, 10.3% had a female householder with no husband present, 5.7% had a male householder with no wife present, and 38.8% were non-families. 34.4% of all households were made up of individuals, and 17.2% had someone living alone who was 65 years of age or older. The average household size was 2.31 and the average family size was 2.94.

The median age in the city was 41 years. 24.9% of residents were under the age of 18; 6.9% were between the ages of 18 and 24; 24% were from 25 to 44; 26.2% were from 45 to 64; and 18.1% were 65 years of age or older. The gender makeup of the city was 47.9% male and 52.1% female.

=== 2000 census ===
As of the census of 2000, there were 2,535 people, 1,057 households, and 658 families living in the city. The population density was 1,210.5 inhabitants per square mile (467.4/km^{2}). There were 1,135 housing units at an average density of 542.0 per square mile (209.3/km^{2}). The racial makeup of the city was 98.11% White, 0.28% African American, 0.04% Native American, 0.67% Asian, 0.28% from other races, and 0.63% from two or more races. Hispanic or Latino of any race were 1.14% of the population.

There were 1,057 households, out of which 30.4% had children under the age of 18 living with them, 48.9% were married couples living together, 9.5% had a female householder with no husband present, and 37.7% were non-families. 32.9% of all households were made up of individuals, and 16.5% had someone living alone who was 65 years of age or older. The average household size was 2.32 and the average family size was 2.98.

Age spread: 25.4% under the age of 18, 6.9% from 18 to 24, 27.5% from 25 to 44, 21.5% from 45 to 64, and 18.7% who were 65 years of age or older. The median age was 38 years. For every 100 females, there were 88.9 males. For every 100 females age 18 and over, there were 85.5 males.

The median income for a household in the city was $36,509, and the median income for a family was $47,153. Males had a median income of $32,986 versus $21,401 for females. The per capita income for the city was $17,425. About 6.1% of families and 7.3% of the population were below the poverty line, including 6.5% of those under age 18 and 11.9% of those age 65 or over.

== Arts and culture ==
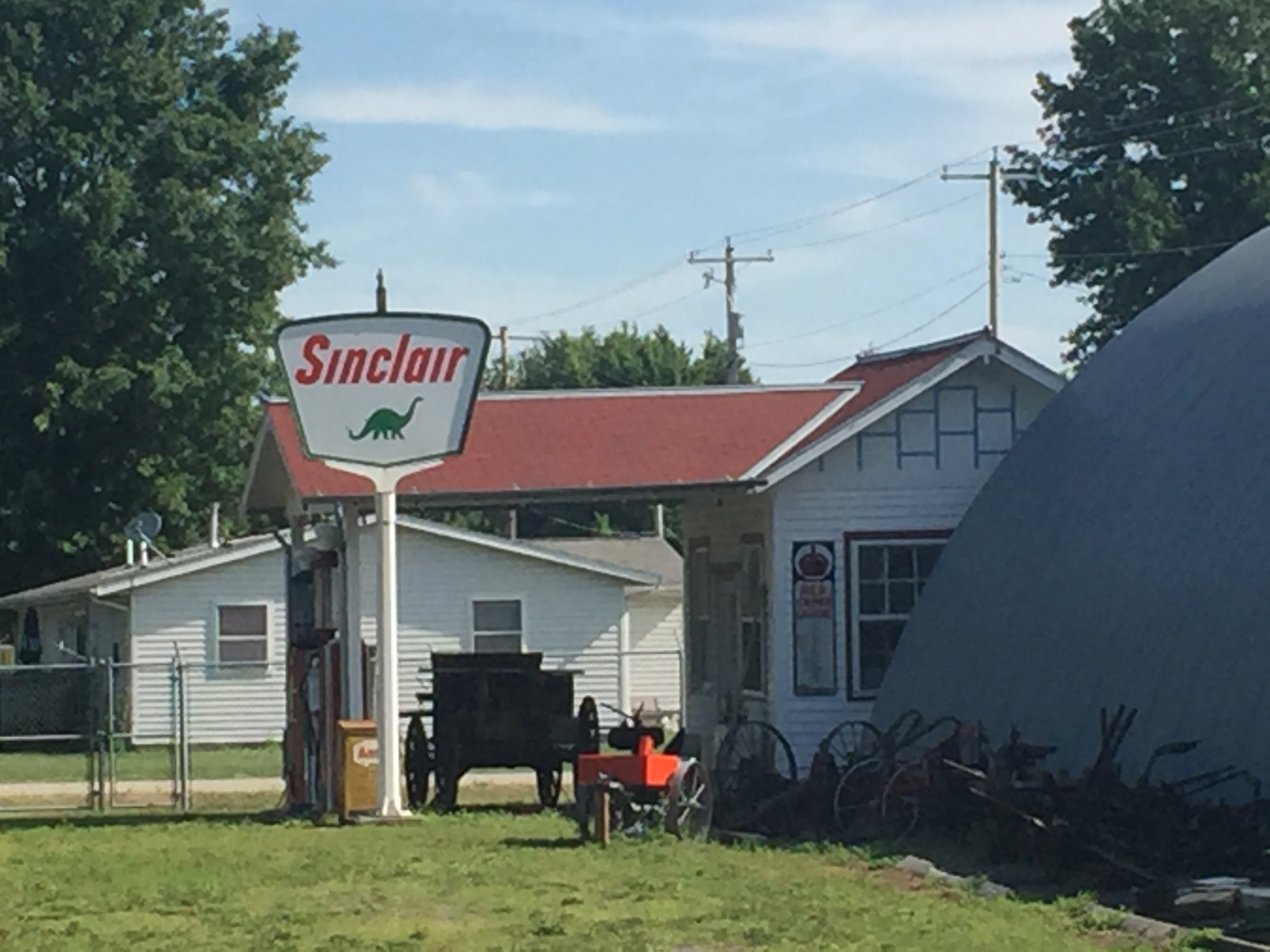
Sinclair Station at Pioneer Heritage Museum

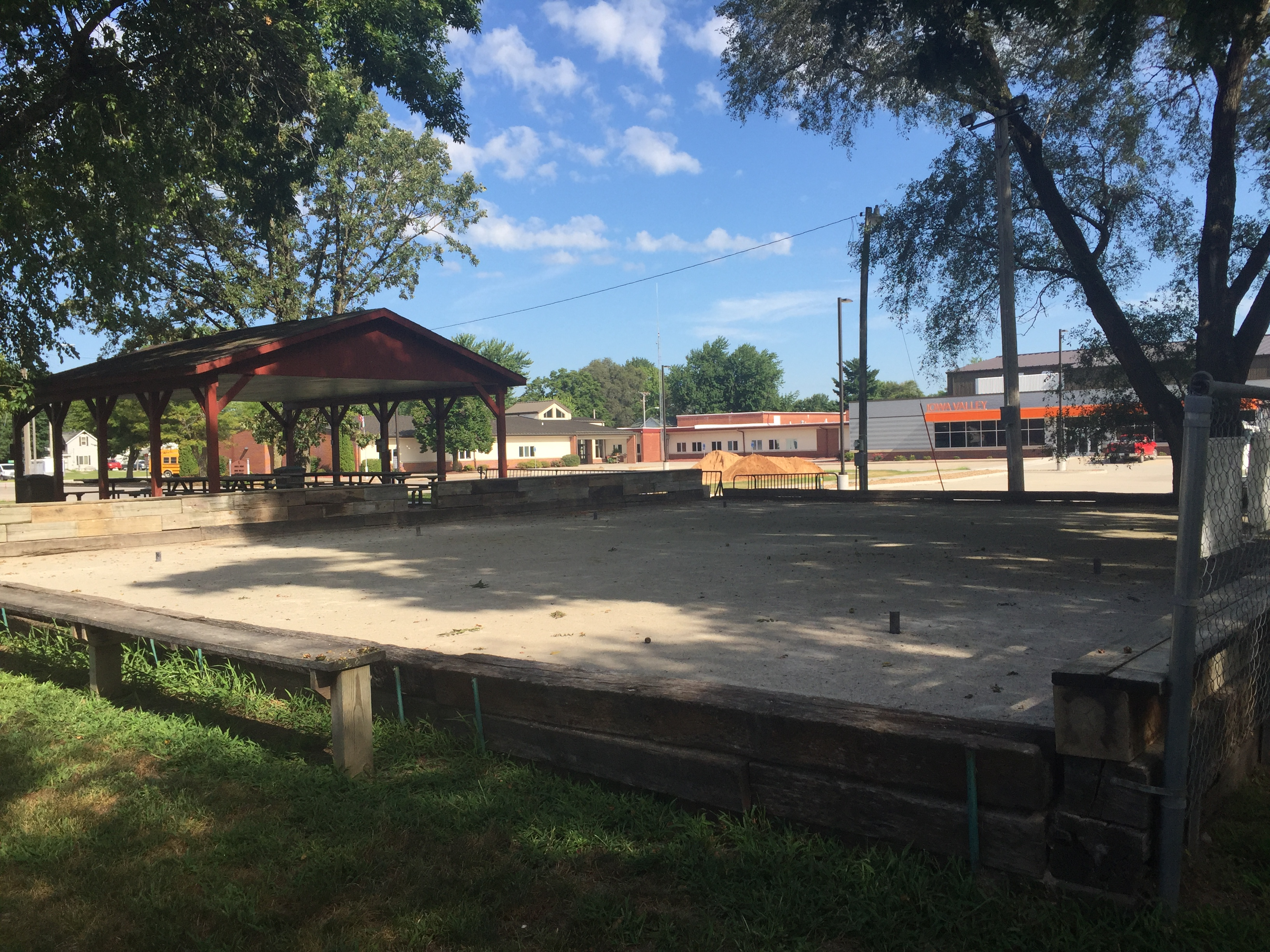
Rolle Bolle Courts in Marengo

The Marengo Public Library is a Carnegie library, constructed in 1905. Marengo is believed to be the smallest town in the United States to have received a donation from Andrew Carnegie for the construction of a library.

Pioneer Heritage Museum features log cabins, a farmhouse, farm implements, household artifacts, clothing and military history items from local residents.

Marengo features Rolle Bolle courts, a yard game known as krulbollen in Belgium. It was brought to the area by Belgian immigrants in the late 19th and early 20th centuries.

== Education ==
Local public schools in Marengo include Iowa Valley Elementary School and Iowa Valley Junior Senior High School, part of the Iowa Valley Community School District.

== Infrastructure ==
The Marengo Volunteer Fire Department has 25 members, and the Marengo Police Department is composed of full-time officers, part-time officers, and reserve officers.

== Notable people ==
- Cliff Clevenger was a U.S. Representative from Ohio who had a business in Marengo
- Travis Fiser, American high school wrestling coach, and a member of the National Wrestling Hall of Fame.
- Cindy Gerard, award-winning romance author, lives outside Marengo.
- Paul Hinrichs, born in Marengo, was a relief pitcher in Major League Baseball,
- Bradley Kasal, born in Marengo, is a Sergeant Major in the U.S. Marine Corps and recipient of the Navy Cross
- Del Miller, born in Marengo, is a college football coach, formerly head coach at Missouri State
- Jeremiah Henry Murphy practiced law in Marengo and was later a U.S. representative
- John N. W. Rumple, a U.S. representative, served as Mayor and in other capacities
- Jarrod Uthoff, professional basketball player, formerly with the Dallas Mavericks and player at University of Iowa.
- Rick Wanamaker, Pan-American Games gold medallist and national champion in decathlon
- Mildred Mott Wedel (1912–1995), scholar of Great Plains archaeology and ethnohistory, born in Marengo.
- Clarence Whitehill, born in Marengo, was a popular opera singer
