= Iowa Department of Education =

Agency in the US state of Iowa

The Iowa Department of Education sets the standards for all public institutions of education in Iowa and accredits private as well as public schools. It is headquartered in Des Moines.

== Organization ==
As of 2020, the Iowa Department of Education consisted of 8 bureaus and works with the oversight of the 11 member Board of Education.

== History ==
The Board of Education was founded in 1857.

In the 2019-2020 school year 93 percent of public school children in Iowa attended school in their neighborhood school district. Prior to 2021, there were only 2 charter schools in Iowa. After Governor Kim Reynolds signed two bills about establishing and operating new charter schools in May 2021, three more were founded in Union, Iowa, Hamburg, Iowa and Des Moines. In 2023, the department received 8 more charter school applications for the 2024-25 School Year, one in Oakmont, three in Cedar Rapids, and four in Des Moines.

Since 2019, the Department of Education has used the Iowa Statewide Assessment for Student Progress (ISASP) since 2023, it has administered the National Assessment of Educational Progress and since. In 2019, the board allocated $2.7 million for school districts and $300,000 for accredited nonpublic schools.

== Department Directors ==
- Chad Aldis, until 2023
- McKenzie Snow, 2023–present

== Bibliography ==
=== Inline references ===
Secondary

- Covington, Nick (November 2, 2022). "Iowans Deserve Better Than "School Choice"". Bleeding Heartland..
- "Charter Schools". educate.iowa.gov. Iowa Department of Education..
- Friedel, Jan; Fletcher, PhD, Jeffery Alan, PhD, MPA (Winter 2020). "Iowa". Journal of Education Finance. 45 (3): 297–299. JSTOR 48642700; Project MUSE 752005; ISSN 1944-6470; ISSN 0098-9495; ISSN 0098-9495; OCLC 10115536830 (article).
- Iowa Assessments. "Iowa Statewide Assessment of Student Progress". iowa.pearsonaccess.com (Pearson Education, Inc.). Archived from the original on January 16, 2021..
- Perry, Theodore Bolivar (1833–1921) (October 1897). Aldrich, Charles John (1828–1908) (ed.). "The Board of Education". Annals of Iowa. Third Series. 3 (3). State Historical Society of Iowa: 200–207. doi:10.17077/0003-4827.2259. Retrieved May 10, 2021. LCCN 05-32209; ISSN 2473-9006 (publication online); ISSN 0003-4827 (publication print); OCLC 1481386 (all editions) (publication); doi:10.17077/0003-4827.2259 (article); OCLC 8598293702 (article).
1. Via State Historical Society of Iowa..
2. Via Google Books (Princeton University Library)..

Primary

- "Condition of Education" (PDF). educateiowa.gov. Iowa Department of Education.
1. 2018 Annual Report..
2. 2019 Annual Report (PDF)..
3. 2020 Annual Report..
4. 2021 Annual Report..
5. 2022 Annual Report (PDF).. OCLC 10131949584.
- "Iowa Department of Education Homepage". educate.iowa.gov. May 14, 2024..
- State of Iowa (June 22, 2023). "Gov. Reynolds Announces Leadership Change at Department of Education". governor.iowa.gov.

=== General references ===
- Aurner, Clarence Ray (1863–1948). History of Education in Iowa. Iowa City: State Historical Society of Iowa. Retrieved April 22, 2024. OCLC 1690178 (all editions).
1. Vol. 1. 1914 – via Google Books (Michigan)..
2. Vol. 2. 1914 – via Internet Archive (Harvard)..
3. Vol. 3. 1914 – via Google Books (University of California)..
4. Vol. 4. 1916 – via Google Books (Michigan)..
5. Vol. 5. State Historical Society of Iowa. 1920 – via Internet Archive (American Foundation for the Blind)..
- Host, Sandra Kessler (2011). Iowa's Rural School System, a Lost Treasure: The Key to Iowa's Rural Settlement Featuring Richland #1 School in Sac County, Near Odebol (published by the author & the Odebolt Historical Museum). Council Bluffs, Iowa. LCCN 2011-908892; ISBN 978-0-6154-3810-8, 0-6154-3810-5; OCLC 743472018.
- Host, Sandra Kessler (2012). Iowa's Rural School System, a Lost Treasure : The Key to Iowa's Rural Settlement Featuring Richland #1 School in Sac County, Near Odebolt (published by the author & the Odebolt Historical Museum) (2nd ed.). Council Bluffs, Iowa. ISBN 0-6156-1515-5, 978-0-6156-1515-8; OCLC 824800426.
- Host, Sandra Kessler (2011). Iowa's Rural Settlement Shaped by Railroads and a System of Rural Schools (published by the author). (adaptation and curriculum components by Dorothy Kessler Engstrom). Council Bluffs, Iowa. LCCN 2011-915317; ISBN 978-0-6155-3152-6, 0-6155-3152-0; OCLC 757745421.
- Host, Sandra Kessler (2014). Iowa Historic Schools: Highlighting Victorian Influence (published by the author). Odebolt, Iowa. LCCN 2014-907326; ISBN 978-0-6922-0078-0, 0-6922-0078-9; OCLC 908192558.
- Host, Sandra Kessler (2015). A New Look at Iowa's One-Room Schools – Iowa's Lost Treasure – A System of 12,623 Rural Schools 1858–1966. Rural Lecacy Project, Odebolt, Iowa. Iowa Rural Schools Museum. Omaha: Standard Printing – via ISSUU. LCCN 2015-907332; ISBN 978-0-9862-0794-5, 0-9862-0794-2; OCLC 1101277601 (all editions).
