= Hegner =

Hegner is a surname, and may refer to:

- Anna Hegner (1881–1963), Swiss violinist and composer
- Anton Hegner (1861–1915), Danish cellist and composer
- Bertha Hofer Hegner (1862–1937), American educator and promoter of the Kindergarten Movement
- Franz Hegner, Swiss modern pentathlete
- Georg Hegner (1897–1985), Danish épée and foil fencer
- Karen Hegner, American politician
- Ludvig Hegner (1851–1923), Danish composer
- Robert William Hegner (1880–1942), American parasitologist

== See also ==
- Jenő Hégner-Tóth (1894–1915), Hungarian water polo player
