= Iowa Highway 146 =

State highway in Iowa, United States

Iowa Highway 146
- Iowa 146 highlighted in red

Route information
- Maintained by Iowa DOT
- Length: 43.165 mi (69.467 km)
- Existed: ca. 1926–present

Major junctions
- South end: US 63 / Iowa 102 in New Sharon
- I-80 at Grinnell; US 6 at Grinnell
- North end: US 30 / CR T37 in Le Grand

Location
- Country: United States
- State: Iowa
- Counties: Mahaska; Poweshiek; Tama; Marshall

Highway system
- Iowa Primary Highway System; Interstate; US; State; Secondary; Scenic
← Iowa 144	→ Iowa 148

Iowa Highway 146 is a state highway in central Iowa. It runs in a north–south orientation and is 43 miles (69 km) long. Iowa 146 begins at an intersection with U.S. Route 63 at New Sharon, and ends at a freeway interchange with U.S. Highway 30 at Le Grand. While the route Iowa 146 takes has remained the same since its creation, the highway has been extended at least twice because of realignments of U.S. Route 30 near Le Grand. The northernmost 2 miles (3.2 km) were once part of the Lincoln Highway.

== Route description ==
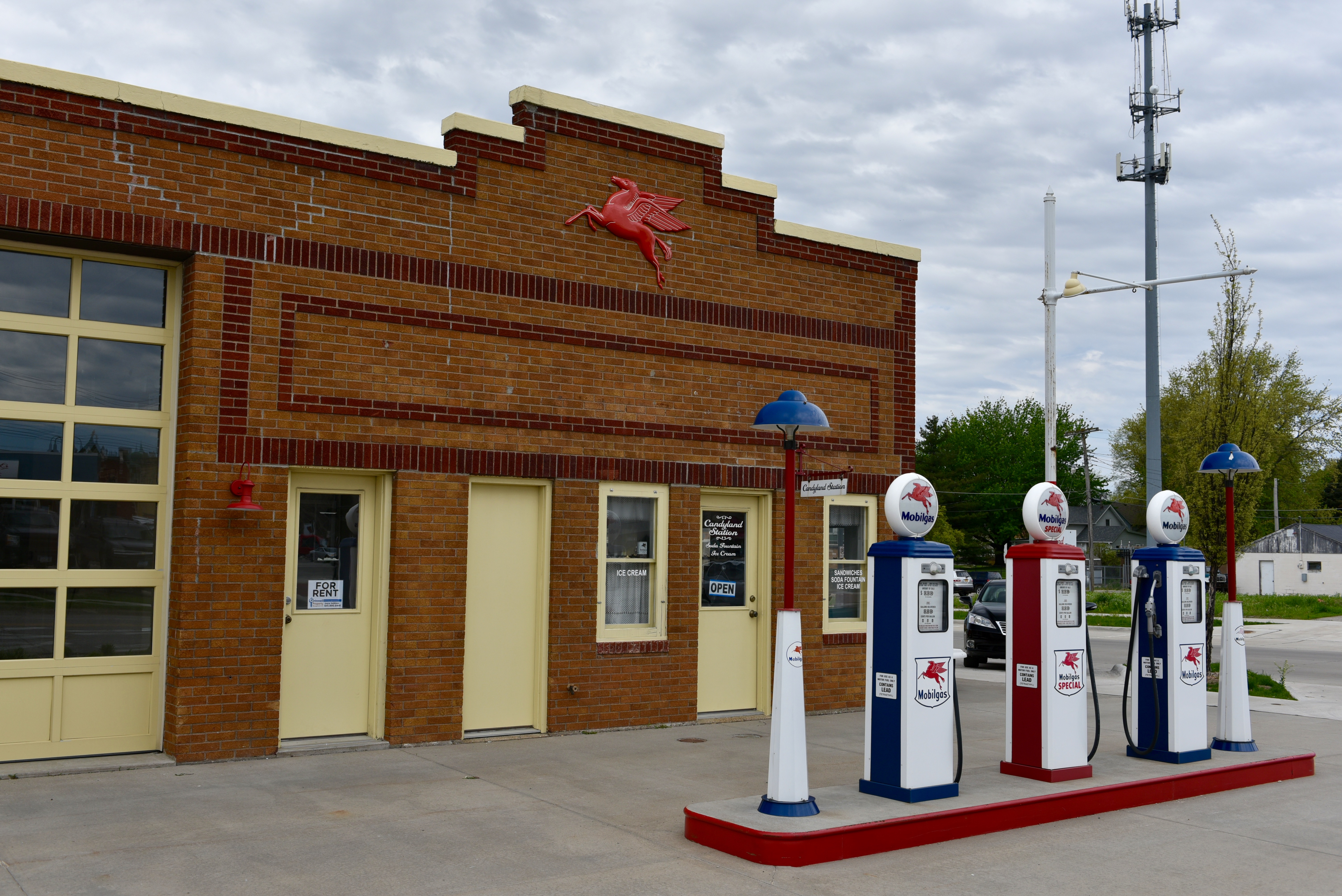
The old Pioneer Oil Company Filling Station in Grinnell

Iowa Highway 146 begins in the city of New Sharon at the corner of Main Street and Market Street. U.S. Highway 63 comes from the south along Main and turns east onto Market. Iowa Highway 102, existing only within New Sharon, but formerly extending to Pella, heads west on Market. Iowa 146 travels north on Main. Two miles (3.2 km) north of New Sharon, Iowa 146 crosses a Union Pacific Railroad line and into Poweshiek County shortly thereafter. Highway 146 heads north for 4 1/2 miles (7.2 km) before curving west towards Searsboro. At Searsboro, Iowa 146 crosses the UPRR line again and turns to the northwest at the eastern end of former Iowa Highway 225, which was turned over to Poweshiek County and Jasper County in 2003.

For two miles (3.2 km), Iowa 146 heads northwest; then, it turns due north towards Grinnell. Just south of Grinnell, Highway 146 meets Interstate 80 at a diamond interchange. Three miles north of I-80, Iowa 146, now along West Street in Grinnell, intersects U.S. Highway 6, which runs along 6th Avenue. Eight miles (13 km) north of Grinnell, Iowa 146 enters Tama County, but only briefly. It turns west and enters Marshall County 2 1/2 miles (4.0 km) later, just east of Gilman. Highway 146 turns north on Elm Street in Gilman. From Gilman, it is an 8 1/2-mile (13.7 km) drive to Le Grand where Iowa 146 ends at Main Street. Prior to US 30 being relocated to the north along an expressway, Main Street carried US 30.

== History ==
Iowa Highway 146 was designated along Primary Road No. 63. When the U.S. Highway System was created in 1926, the Iowa State Highway Commission had a policy of renumbering state highways to avoid duplicating U.S. Highway numbers; US 63, in this case. Iowa 146 has been extended northward at least twice. A 2-mile (3.2 km) section of the Lincoln Highway became a part of U.S. Route 30 was straightened between Tama and Marshalltown.

== Popular culture ==
The song "Iowa 146" by Squirrel Flower is a reference to this highway. The song's composer, Ella Williams, attended Grinnell College in Grinnell, which is bisected by Highway 146. Williams stated "The title is named after this road in Iowa that I spent a lot of time on driving and biking."

== Major intersections ==
County	Location	mi	km	Destinations	Notes
Mahaska	New Sharon	0.000	0.000	US 63 (S. Main Street) / W. Market Street – Pella, Montezuma, Oskaloosa	
Poweshiek	Grinnell	18.507	29.784	I-80 (Exit 182) – Des Moines, Davenport	
Poweshiek	Grinnell	21.952	35.328	US 6 (6th Avenue)	
Tama	No major junctions				
Marshall	Le Grand	43.165	69.467	US 30 north / CR T37 – Marshalltown, Toledo	Roadway continues as CR T37
1.000 mi = 1.609 km; 1.000 km = 0.621 mi
