= Murder of Mollie Tibbetts =

2018 murder in Iowa, U.S.

Mollie Tibbetts
- Tibbetts in 2018
- Born: Mollie Cecilia Tibbetts; May 8, 1998; San Francisco, California, U.S.
- Disappeared: July 18, 2018 (aged 20); Brooklyn, Iowa, U.S.
- Status: Found deceased
- Cause of death: Stab wounds
- Body discovered: August 21, 2018; Poweshiek County, Iowa, U.S.
- Education: University of Iowa
- Occupation: Children's day camp worker
- Employer: Grinnell Regional Medical Center

On July 18, 2018, Mollie Cecilia Tibbetts, a 20-year-old University of Iowa student, disappeared while jogging near her home in Brooklyn, Iowa. A month later, police identified 24-year-old Cristhian Bahena Rivera as a suspect in connection with the disappearance; surveillance footage showed Rivera's car following Tibbetts on her jog. Rivera led police to the body of Tibbetts in a Poweshiek County cornfield on August 21. He was charged with first-degree murder. On May 28, 2021, Rivera was found guilty of first-degree murder. On August 30, 2021, Rivera was sentenced to life in prison without parole.

Rivera's immigration status became publicly known after police, the U.S. Citizenship and Immigration Services (USCIS), and U.S. Immigration and Customs Enforcement (ICE) indicated that he had been in the United States illegally. The Trump administration and some Republicans, including Iowa Governor Kim Reynolds, said the murder could have been prevented with more restrictive immigration policies.

== Victim ==
Mollie Cecilia Tibbetts was born on May 8, 1998, in San Francisco, California, to Rob and Laura Tibbetts. When she was in the second grade, her parents divorced, and she moved to Iowa with her mother and two siblings. Her father kept a close relationship with the children, and he last saw his daughter at his wedding in June 2018. At the time of her disappearance, she was a resident of Brooklyn, Iowa, a small town about 70 miles (110 km) east of Des Moines, and a psychology major at the University of Iowa. She worked at a children's day camp at Grinnell Regional Medical Center and was preparing for her sophomore year in college when she disappeared.

== Disappearance ==
On July 18, 2018, Tibbetts, a former cross country runner, left the home of her boyfriend in Brooklyn for an evening jog. She was last seen at approximately 7:30 p.m. CDT and was reported missing by her family when she did not show up for work the following day. According to police, her last confirmed communication was with her boyfriend of three years, shortly before leaving for her jog. Her boyfriend was out of town for work in Dubuque, Iowa, over 130 miles (210 km) away. He told investigators he received a Snapchat message from her later in the evening that appeared to show her indoors.

== Investigation ==
Over the next several weeks, police in multiple states investigated hundreds of leads in the case, including an unconfirmed sighting at a truck stop in Kearney, Missouri (later confirmed to have been false), but were not able to locate Tibbetts. They received over 2,300 tips and conducted over 500 interviews during the course of the investigation. As she was known to always wear her Fitbit activity tracker, police attempted to use its data to help find her.

About four weeks after Tibbetts' disappearance, police said that the search had been refocused to several specific areas in and around Brooklyn, including her boyfriend's home, a truck stop, a car wash, and two area farms. Prior to the discovery of Tibbetts' body, monetary rewards for information leading to closure in the case had reached over $366,000, surpassing the previous record reward amount raised by the local Crime Stoppers branch. As the money was to be used as a reward on the condition of her safe return, Crime Stoppers announced that the money would be returned to those who requested it, or disbursed to the general Crime Stoppers fund and/or to the Tibbetts family.

On August 21, police in Iowa announced that a body had been found in Poweshiek County, where Tibbetts' hometown of Brooklyn is located; the body was identified as Tibbetts' in an autopsy that was conducted two days later by the Iowa State Medical Examiner. They had been led to the site by 24-year-old suspect Cristhian Bahena Rivera. On August 23, the Iowa State Medical Examiner performed an autopsy and recorded the cause of death as "multiple sharp force injuries" and the manner as homicide.

== Perpetrator ==
Cristhian Bahena Rivera, age 24 at the time of the crime, lived and worked in the rural Poweshiek County area where Tibbetts vanished. Originally from El Guayabillo, Guerrero, Mexico, he arrived illegally in the United States at age 17 and had lived in the area for several years. He had worked at another farm before coming to Yarrabee Farms near Brooklyn, Iowa, in August 2014. Rivera self-identified and received his paychecks under the name John Budd.

Rivera became a target of investigators after they obtained footage from a nearby surveillance camera, showing a Chevrolet Malibu driving back and forth in the area where Tibbetts was jogging. After linking the car to him, police approached him without incident. They said that he confessed to kidnapping and killing her, and then dumping her body. According to an affidavit filed by the Poweshiek County Sheriff's Office, he led them to the body in a secluded location within a cornfield.

=== Immigration status ===
A spokesman on the behalf of the U.S. Citizenship and Immigration Services said its systems did not indicate Rivera "has any lawful immigration status." Later, U.S. Immigration and Customs Enforcement confirmed this determination, by saying "law enforcement remains absolutely confident that we've correctly identified the suspect as an illegal alien from Mexico, based both on investigative interviews with him and on records checks." Rivera worked at Yarrabee Farms, owned by the family of a prominent Iowa Republican leader, Craig Lang. As part of his employment, the Lang family allowed Rivera to live rent-free on their land. Yarrabee Farms initially claimed that they had vetted Rivera's immigration status through the federal E-Verify program. After E-Verify indicated that Yarrabee Farms was not subscribed to its program, Yarrabee Farms said it used the Social Security Administration system and clarified that Rivera had given them false information. In a motion for a gag order on August 22, Rivera's lawyer said Rivera was in the United States legally, but was ultimately unable to provide any evidence that supported this claim and his lawyer withdrew from the case several days later.

== Legal proceedings ==
On August 22, 2018, Rivera was charged with first-degree murder. The judge raised his bond from $1 million to $5 million when the prosecutor noted him as a flight risk. On August 24, Rivera changed his legal counsel. Chad and Jennifer Frese, a now-divorced couple who worked for the same law firm, were privately retained by Rivera's relatives to represent him. On September 19, Rivera pleaded not guilty. On May 17, 2021, Rivera's criminal trial began, after many delays due to other court proceedings and to the ongoing COVID-19 pandemic. On May 28, 2021, Rivera was found guilty of first degree murder. The judge ordered him to be held without bond. Rivera faced a mandatory sentence of life imprisonment without parole. The state of Iowa has no death penalty. On August 30, 2021, Rivera was sentenced to life in prison without parole. As of August 18, 2026, Iowa records show that Rivera is incarcerated at the Anamosa State Penitentiary in Anamosa, Iowa.

== Reactions ==
=== Memorials and tributes ===
Tibbetts' younger brother and his football team memorialized her by printing her initials on the team jerseys. Some runners used the hashtag #MilesforMollie to highlight harassment and safety issues experienced by women who run, since she had been attacked while running. Her friends started an online group that gained attention on social media called "The Mollie Movement", which encourages people to be kind to each other in her honor. During her funeral, her family called for mourners to remember her passion for life and desire to help others, by "celebrating something wonderful", such as her father highlighting the marriage of Blake and Allie Jack, who had been married the day previous. Tibbetts would have been maid of honor at their wedding.

=== Politicization of Tibbetts's death ===
The case became a political talking point for more restrictive immigration policies. Opponents of illegal immigration emphasized that the suspect had entered the country illegally. Others argued that research shows that undocumented immigrants are less likely to commit crimes than native-born Americans. Liberals characterized the politicization of Tibbetts's murder as fearmongering. Vice President Mike Pence called attention to the case at the beginning of a speech in Des Moines on August 15, telling a crowd of President Donald Trump's supporters that the government would continue to provide "any and all federal support" to the case. Pence later met with the Tibbetts family aboard Air Force Two. President Trump on August 22 said: “A person came in from Mexico illegally and killed her. We need the wall, we need our immigration laws changed, we need our border laws changed." A campaign email sent by the Donald J. Trump for President, Inc. committee blamed Democrats' immigration policies for Tibbetts' death.

In August 2018, after the body of Tibbetts was recovered, the Tibbetts family released a statement in which they asked for time and privacy. In addition, Tibbetts' father—responding to Donald Trump Jr.—criticized as "heartless" and "despicable" the use of Tibbetts's death for political purposes; he especially decried its use against immigrants. Tibbetts's father said, "The Hispanic community are Iowans. They have the same values as Iowans. As far as I'm concerned, they're Iowans with better food." He denounced those who "appropriate Mollie's soul in advancing views she believed were profoundly racist".

== See also ==
- Illegal immigration to the United States
- Killing of Jocelyn Nungaray
- Murder of Laken Riley
