= New Sharon =

New Sharon may refer to a place in the United States:

- New Sharon, Iowa
- New Sharon, Maine
- New Sharon, New Jersey
