= Grinnell Historical Museum =

Coordinates: 41°44′49″N 92°43′28″W

The Grinnell Historical Museum is a non-profit organization focused on collection and preservation of the history of Grinnell and Poweshiek County, Iowa. The museum used to be located in the historic McMurray House at 1125 Broad Street, a part of the North Grinnell Historic District. In June of 2025, the museum moved to 703 First Ave., a newly renovated space with modern accommodations for collection storage and exhibits. The museum also creates and maintains displays of local history materials at Drake Community Library and Grinnell City Hall.

== Formation and facilities ==
The effort to form a Grinnell museum was started in 1950 by four Grinnell women's groups – two chapters of the Daughters of the American Revolution (DAR), the Historical and Literary Club, and the Tuesday Club. They began by collecting donations and funds and soon had artifacts housed in the upper floor of a local business in downtown Grinnell. Sadly, in 1954, the building and most of its contents were destroyed by fire. Efforts continued until donations and funds allowed the purchase of a historic late-Victorian 10-room residence at 1125 Broad Street. The house served as the home of the museum from that time until the move to a purpose-built space in summer 2025. The McMurray House was beautifully maintained with displays throughout. Concern with an inability to comply with ADA requirements as well as a structure-imposed limitation on exhibits led the board of directors to move to the 703 First Ave. location.

In 2010, the museum began creating displays of smaller items in their collection in display cases in the lobby of Drake Community Library in Grinnell. This space allows exhibitions of items like cameras, tools, sewing machines, and buttons in an area that receives high traffic. Museum staff were instrumental in the display of historical materials for the Iowa Transportation Museum located at Grinnell City Hall in the renovated Spaulding Manufacturing buildings.

=== Publications and research ===
The museum has been instrumental in the publication of two books about the history of Grinnell. A children's book on the history of Grinnell was published in 2016. "Grinnell: Our Prairie Town" is used by area school children to learn the history of the area. A book entitled "Grinnell Stories: African Americans of Early Grinnell" was published in 2020 by the museum. Included in this book are multiple chapters on the Renfrow family. Notable members of the family include Helen Lemme and Edith Renfrow Smith.

In 2017, the research of museum volunteers was instrumental in identifying the lost works of photographer Cornelia Clarke.
