= Iowa Highway 102 =

State highway in Iowa, United States

Iowa Highway 102
- Iowa 102 highlighted in red

Route information
- Maintained by Iowa State Highway Commission
- Length: 0.501 mi (806 m)
- Existed: 1980–present

Major junctions
- West end: CR G5T at the New Sharon city limits
- East end: US 63 / Iowa 146 in New Sharon

Location
- Country: United States
- State: Iowa
- Counties: Mahaska

Highway system
- Iowa Primary Highway System; Interstate; US; State; Secondary; Scenic
← Iowa 100	→ Iowa 105

Iowa Highway 102 (Iowa 102) is a very short state highway entirely within the city of New Sharon, Iowa. The entire 0.5-mile (0.80 km) route is along Market Street in New Sharon. The route begins at New Sharon's western city limit where it continues as Mahaska County Road G5T and ends at the corner of Market and Main Streets in New Sharon, where U.S. Route 63 and Iowa Highway 146 intersect.

== Route description ==
Iowa 102 began at exit 44, a diamond interchange along Iowa 163 at Pella. It headed north along Adams Street until it reached Vermeer Road. It turned to the east and headed to the northeast in a stairstep path for 3 3/4 miles (6.0 km). It continued in a stairstep path as it ran east for four miles then turned to the north for one mile (1.6 km). It headed east for two miles (3.2 km), jogged north for 1/2 mile (0.80 km), and then east again for 1 1/2 miles (2.4 km). Now at the western city limits of New Sharon, the current extent of Iowa 102 begins. Along Market Street, Iowa 102 travels 1/2 mile (0.80 km) to Main Street. At the corner of Main and Market Streets, Iowa 102 comes from the west and ends, US 63 approaches from the south on Main Street and leaves east on Market, and Iowa 146 begins and heads to the north.

== History ==
Originally designated in 1980, Iowa 102 connected the cities of Pella and New Sharon. In Pella, Iowa 102's western end moved a few times. Upon its designation, Iowa 102 ended at Main Street, then Iowa Highway 163, at Central Park in downtown Pella. In the mid-1980s, the western end moved to what is now 240th Place in Mahaska County, just east of Pella. In 1996, when Iowa 163 was bypassed around Pella, Iowa 102's western end was again moved, this time to where the new Iowa 163 bypass rejoined the older Iowa 163, now Iowa 163 Business.

On December 23, 2002, the Mahaska County Board of Supervisors voted unanimously to accept 15.4 miles (24.8 km) of the 15.9-mile-long (25.6 km) route, extending from the Iowa Highway 163 bypass to the western city limits of New Sharon leaving only the half-mile segment in New Sharon on the state rolls. The Iowa Department of Transportation approved the transfer on January 13, 2003.

== Major intersections ==
The entire route is in New Sharon, Mahaska County.

mi	km	Destinations	Notes
0.000	0.000	CR G5T	Continuation west of New Sharon
0.501	0.806	US 63 south / Iowa 146 north (Main Street) US 63 north (Market Street)	Southern end of Iowa 146
1.000 mi = 1.609 km; 1.000 km = 0.621 mi
