= Cornelia Clarke =

American photographer (1884–1936)

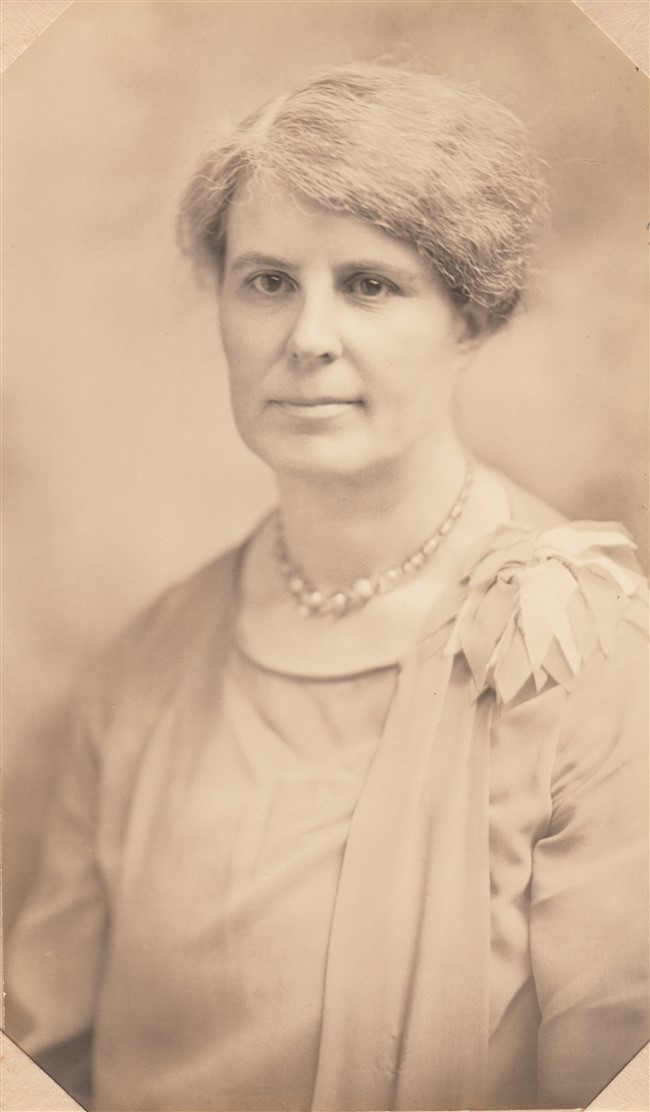
Photo of Cornelia Clarke a few years before her death in 1936

Cornelia Clarke (July 4, 1884 – September 29, 1936) was a nature photographer from Grinnell, Iowa. Over 1,200 of her photographs were published in magazines, encyclopedias, books and newspapers. Her earliest published photos were of her pet cats, Peter and Polly, dressed and posed imitating human activities. These popular photos were turned into a children's book. As her skills advanced, her reputation for capturing objects in nature spread, with her specialty being insect and plant life. She also took a variety of natural landscape photographs, especially of the area around her home in Grinnell, Iowa. Many of the original photographs and glass plate negatives are in the collections of the Drake Community Library, Grinnell Historical Museum, and the State Historical Society of Iowa.

== Early life and education ==
Cornelia Clarke was born just north of Grinnell, Iowa on July 4, 1884. Her mother died within a few hours of her birth and Cornelia was raised by her father, Ray Clarke. Cornelia had a rather lonely childhood, spending most of her time alone or with her father. At a young age she closely observed her father as he took photographs. The first photographs she took were of her cats, using her father's equipment while he was out of the house. With her father's encouragement, she refined her skills and her ability to stage photographs of animals and plants that would show incredible detail.

She attended Grinnell High School and Grinnell College, graduating in 1909. As a student, Clarke took photos for the college public relations office. In later years, she was the honorary curator of the Grinnell College herbarium. Her photographs were used by faculty in teaching, notably Henry Conard, who took possession of the images after Cornelia's death.

== Career ==
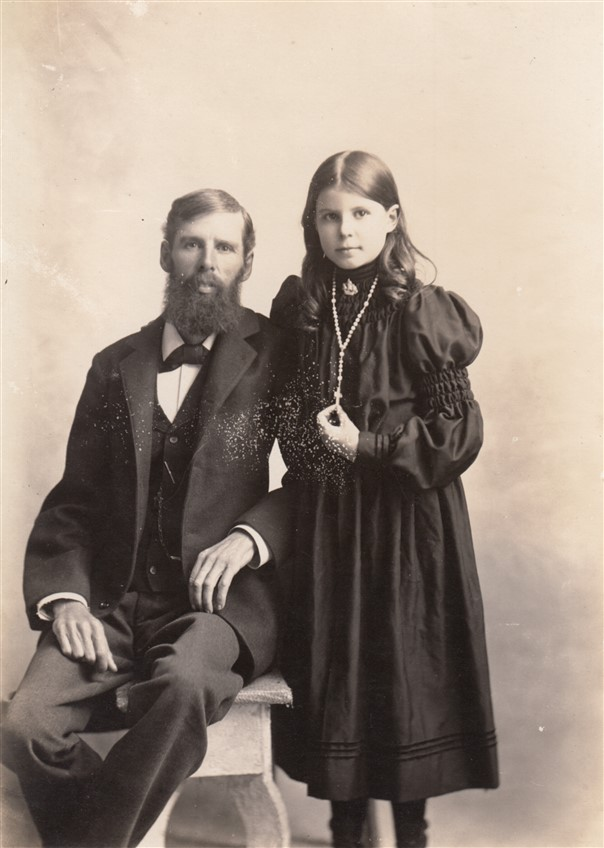
Cornelia Clarke and her father

Clarke first gained national attention for a series of photographs of her pet cats, Peter and Polly. She had dressed the cats in detailed miniature outfits, and posed them with miniature furniture she created. The series of photos was published in County Life in America magazine in 1911. The photos had been accompanied by captions that outlined a story of two kittens who grew up together, fell in love, married, started a family, and did adult-like chores. The photos were very popular and by 1912 Cornelia had started a collaboration with Elizabeth Hays Wilkinson. Wilkinson had already authored several children's books and the two worked together to turn the story into a book. Published by Doubleday and Co. in 1912, Peter and Polly is a 97-page book. The photographs by Clarke appear throughout in colorized version. Many glass slides of the Peter and Polly photos are held by the Drake Community Library in Grinnell, Iowa. In addition, the Grinnell Historical Museum has multiple artifacts related to Cornelia's life, including her camera and numerous cards made with her photos.

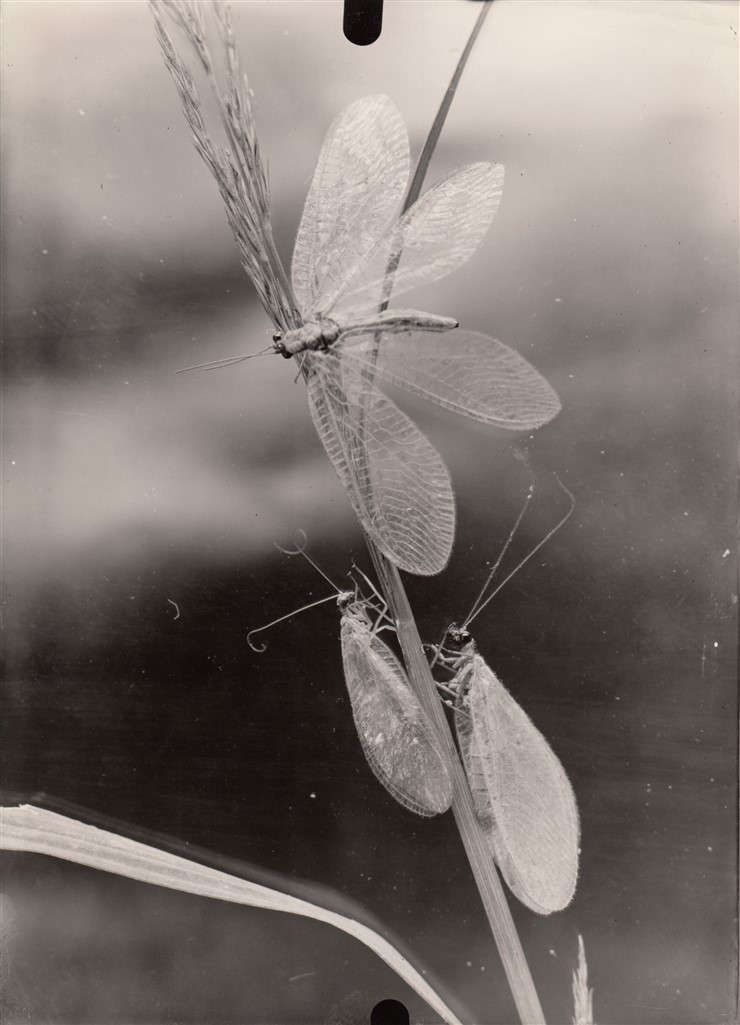
One of the hundreds of botanical photographs by Cornelia Clarke

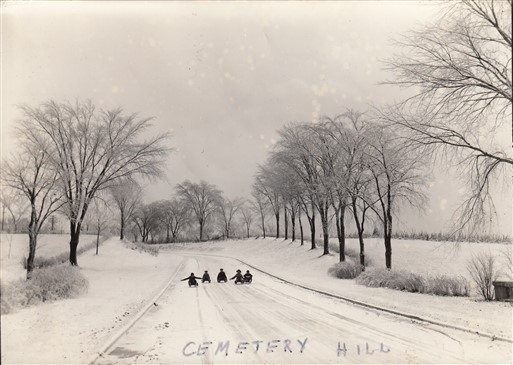
Photo by Cornelia Clarke of children sledding on the hill in Hazelwood Cemetery, Grinnell, Iowa

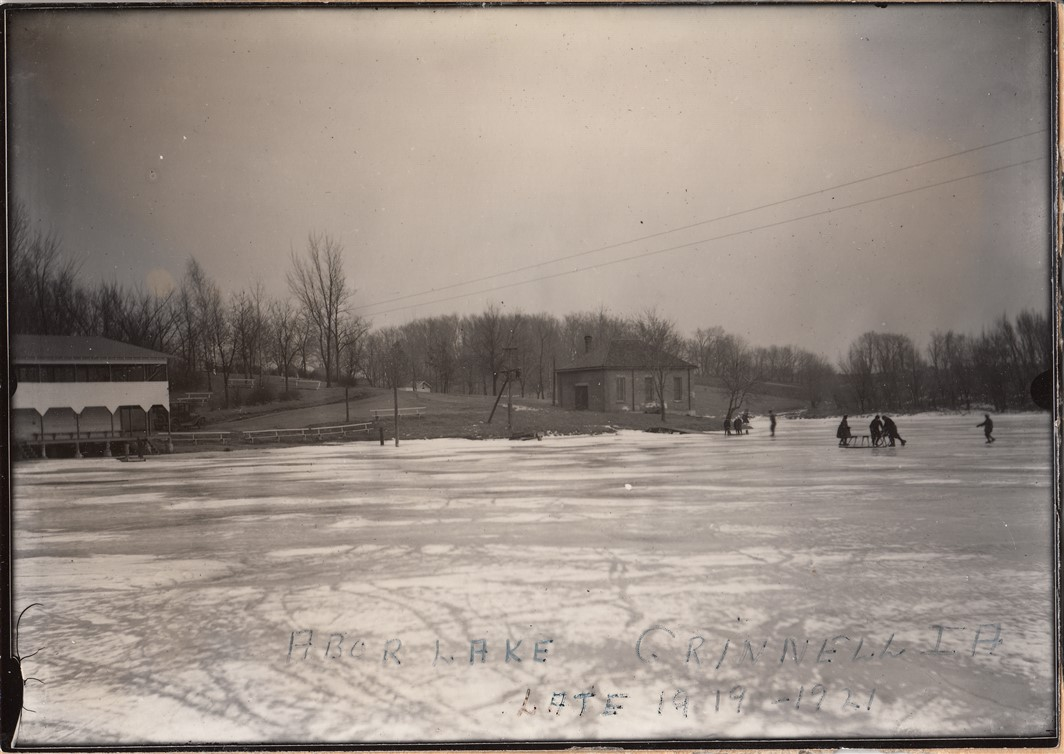
Photo by Cornelia Clarke of ice skating on Arbor Lake, Grinnell, Iowa

As Clarke gained a wider audience, several pieces were written about the techniques she used. On September 10, 1922, the Des Moines Register included an article entitled "How Cornelia Clarke does it." She offered additional insight in two articles for Photo Era: The American Journal of Photography. In these articles she detailed how she would bring the objects from the natural world into her home to stage them, recreating nature in her living room in order to allow for extreme closeups of plants without the advantage of a zoom lens. Of the hundreds of botanical photographs published, the majority were taken at or near her home in Iowa. She also took numerous photos of the area around her community. She was an unassuming community member, and many did not realize the extent of her success until after her death.

== Rediscovery of her work ==
The extent of Clarke's work was largely lost until 2017 when historian, Dan Kaiser, began to research her story. Some artifacts and images from her life and work were in the collections of the Grinnell Historical Museum and the archives of the Drake Community Library. These were mostly the early cat images, photos of Cornelia and her father, and her camera. There were no botanical photos and very little about the extent of that work among the Iowa collections. Kaiser's research brought to light the extent of her published works. It is estimated that more than 1,200 of her photographs have appeared in scientific journals, textbooks, and a number of encyclopedias, many of them published long after her death. Kaiser's research also unearthed the mystery of what happened to the glass plates of the botanical photos she had created while working for Grinnell College. Through his research, he discovered that the plates were held at the State Historical Society of Iowa, mistakenly labeled as the work of Henry Conard, the Grinnell College professor who had used her work widely in his teaching. Through the work of Mr. Kaiser and members of the Grinnell Historical Museum, the glass plates were located, identified and indexed and a selection of 100 were digitized. In 2019, the Grinnell Historical Museum celebrated "The Year of Cornelia Clarke." An exhibit of her work was displayed at the Grinnell Area Arts Center Stewart Gallery and the Drake Community Library. In 2021, she was inducted into the Iowa Women's Hall of Fame.

== Notable publications including Cornelia Clarke photographs ==
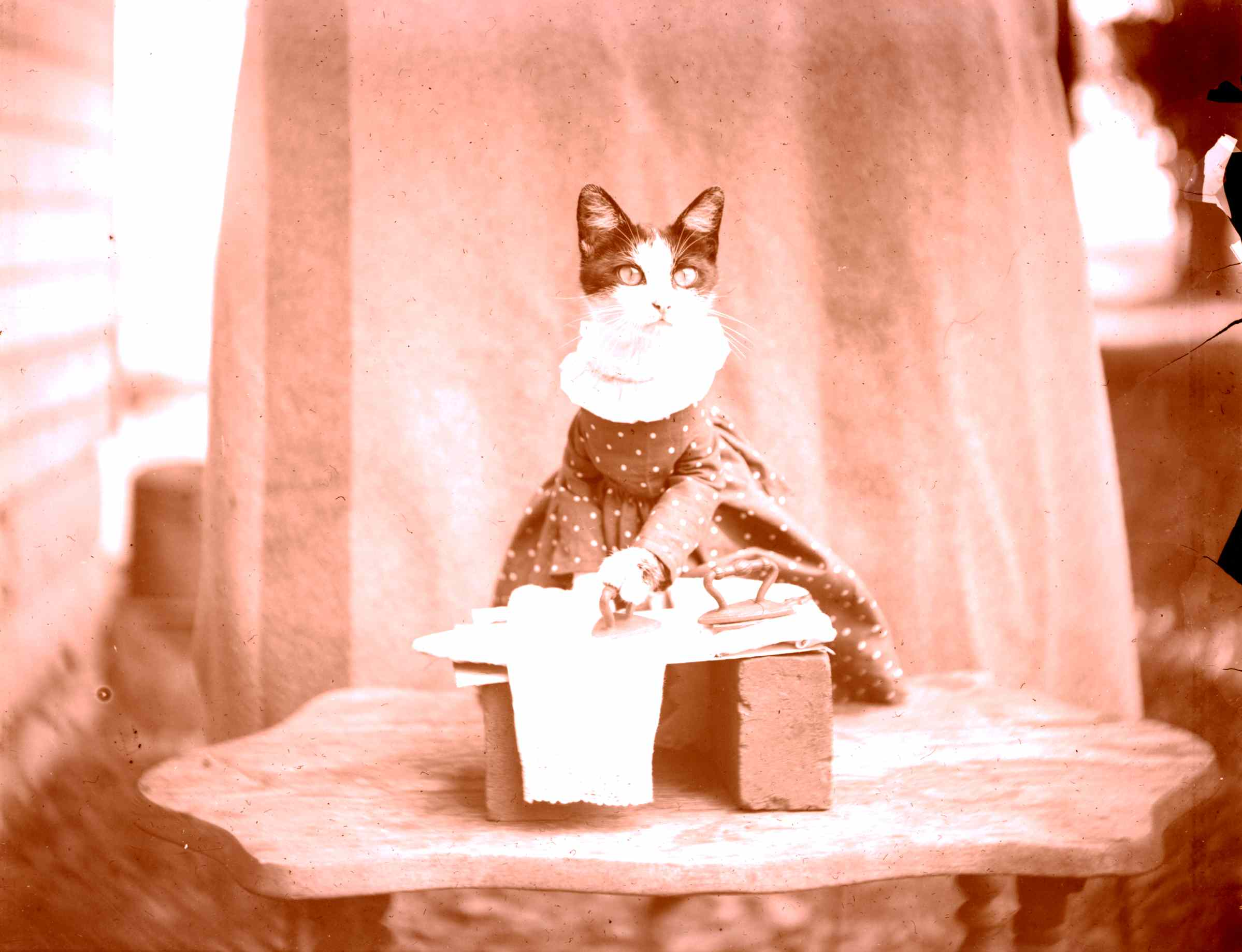
One of the series of Peter and Polly photos by Cornelia Clarke

A detailed list was compiled by Dan Kaiser and is available from Drake Community Library, in Grinnell, Iowa.

=== Photography periodicals ===
- American Photography (1923-1930)
- Camera Craft (1924)
- Photo-Era Magazine (1922-1925)

=== Encyclopedias ===
- World Book Encyclopedia (various editions, 1947–1987)
- Richards Topical Encyclopedia (1947)
- Grolier Encyclopedia (1960)
- The Book of Knowledge: The Children's Encyclopedia (1950)
- The Book of Popular Science (1957)

=== Science periodicals ===
- Nature Magazine (1925-1939)
- Science News-letter (1930-1937)
- Natural History (1936-1941)
- Proceedings of the Iowa Academy of Science (1928-1929)

=== Science textbooks and monographs ===
- Science of Animal Life: An Introduction to Zoology by William Morton Barrows (1927)
- Parade of the Animal Kingdom by Robert W. Hegner (1935)
- An Introduction to the Plant Kingdom by Norman H. Russel (1958)
- Insect People by Eleanor King and Wellmer Pessels (1937)
- Working with Nature: with 60 offset illustrations by Eleanor King and Wellmer Pessels (1940)
- Bats by Glover Morrill Allen (1939/1967 reprint)
- Animals without Backbones by Ralph Buchsbaum (1938)
- Biology and Human Welfare by James E. Peabody (1933)
- Biology and Human Affairs (1941)
- Biology for Today by Francis D. Curtis (1939)

=== Children's books ===
- The Baby Animal Zoo by William & Stella Nida (1928)
- Holiday Meadow by Edith M. Patch (1930)
- Holiday Pond by Edith Patch (1930)
- Holiday Hill by Edith Patch (1931)
- Nature and Science Readers by Edith Patch, Books 3-5 (1935)
- Child and Universe by Bertha Stevens (1931)
- The Child Goes Forth by Bertha Stevens (1936)
- Science Picture Parade by Davis Watson (1940)
- How Miracles Abound by Bertha Stevens (1941)
- Insect People by Eleanor King and Wellmer Pessels (1937)
- Man and the Animal World by Bernal Robinson Weimer (1951)

=== Newspapers ===
- Des Moines Register
- Cedar Rapids Gazette
- Detroit Free Press
- Los Angeles Times
- St. Louis Post-Dispatch
- Miami News
- "Peter and Polly" in Country Life in America (1911)

== Personal life ==
An automobile accident in 1929 was the beginning of the final years of Cornelia's life. Both she and her father were injured in the accident that took the life of the other driver. Soon after, Clarke's health began to fail, and in the 1930s she was diagnosed with cancer. She died on September 29, 1936, and is buried in Hazelwood Cemetery with her mother and father in Grinnell, Iowa.
