= Spaulding (automobile) =

Defunct American motor vehicle manufacturer

Spaulding was used as an automobile marque by two separate companies. The Spaulding Automobile and Motor Company of Buffalo, New York, built Veteran Era automobiles in 1902 and 1903. Spaulding Manufacturing Company of Grinnell, Iowa, built Brass Era automobiles from 1910 to 1916.

== Spaulding (1902–1903) ==
Spaulding Automobile and Motor Company
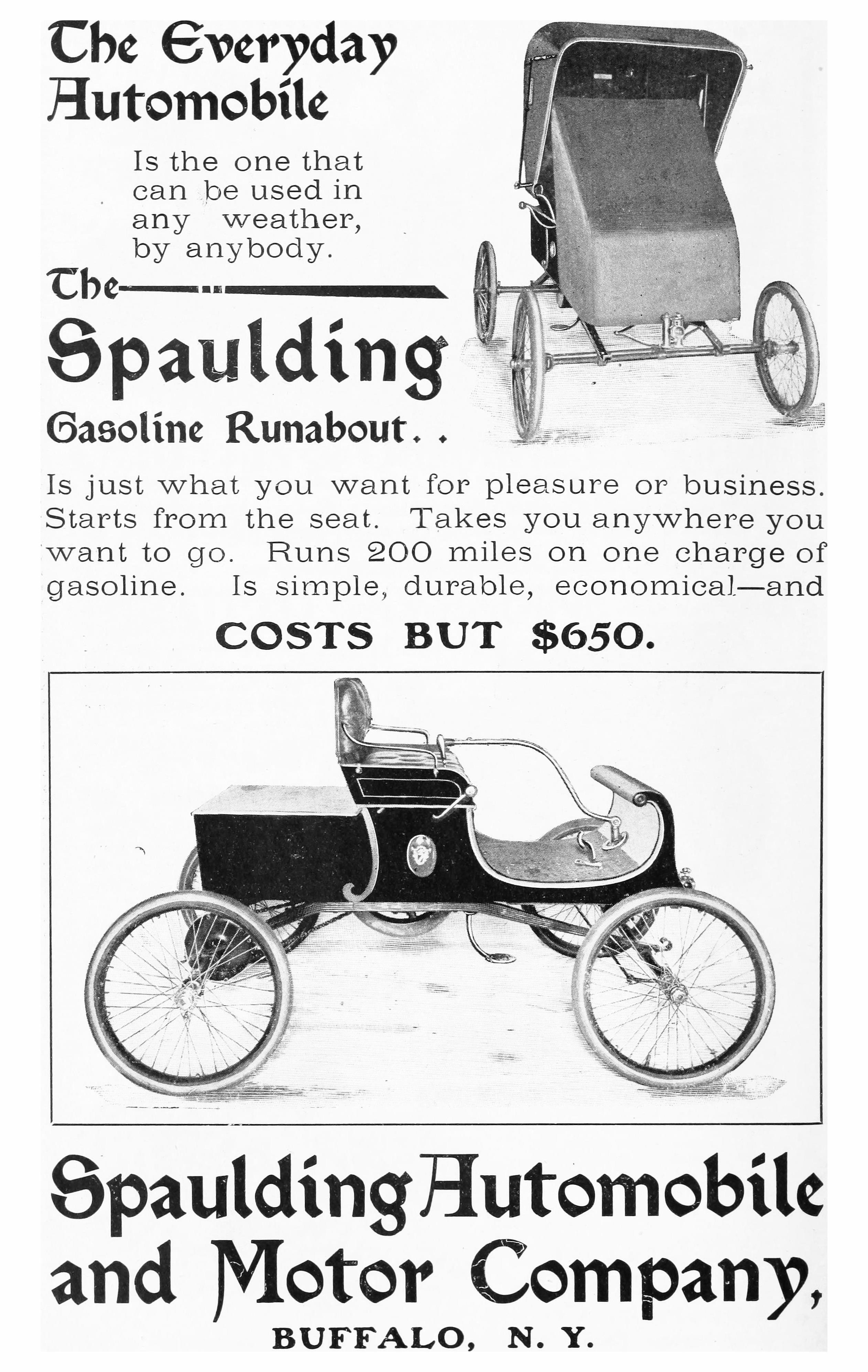
- 1902 Spaulding Runabout advertisement in Cycle and Automobile Trade Journal
- Industry: Automotive
- Predecessor: Spaulding Machine Screw Company
- Founded: 1902; 124 years ago
- Founder: Henry F. Spaulding, C. M. Spaulding
- Defunct: 1903; 123 years ago
- Fate: Bankruptcy
- Successor: Morlock Automobile Manufacturing Company
- Headquarters: Buffalo, New York, United States

The Spaulding Automobile and Motor Company of Buffalo, New York, was incorporated in January 1902 by Henry F. Spaulding and his brother C. M. Spaulding. Start-up of Spaulding production was delayed by a lawsuit brought by the Olds Motor Works regarding infringement of its motor patents. Henry Spaulding redesigned his single-cylinder engine and manufactured a run of 100 Spaulding runabouts. The spring suspension of the Spaulding was very much like the curved-dash Oldsmobile as well, and Olds sued again.

The 6-hp single-cylinder runabout sold for $650 in 1902, increased to $700 (equivalent to $25,083 in 2025) in 1903. The runabout steered by tiller and featured a planetary transmission. Spaulding introduced a larger two-cylinder tonneau touring car in January 1903. The touring car had wheel steering and a three-speed sliding gear transmission. The vertical 25-hp two-cylinder engine was located under the hood. Spaulding displayed at the Chicago and New York Automobile Shows. Spaulding planned to price the Touring car at $1,200, equivalent to $43,000 in 2025.

By February 1903 the company was in financial trouble and in March was sold at a receiver's sale to J. F. Morlock who built the Spaulding runabout as a Morlock until October 1903. In August 1903, Henry F. Spaulding was testing a new experimental car on the tow path of the Erie Canal where he drove the car into the canal and was drowned.

Spaulding Models

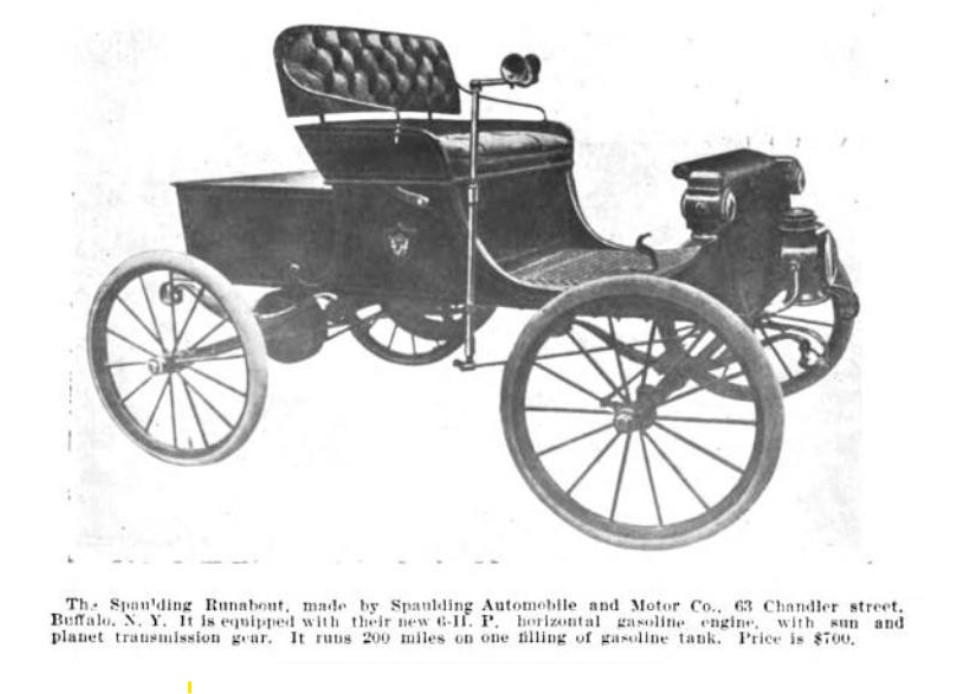
1902 Spaulding Runabout in Cycle and Automobile Trade Journal

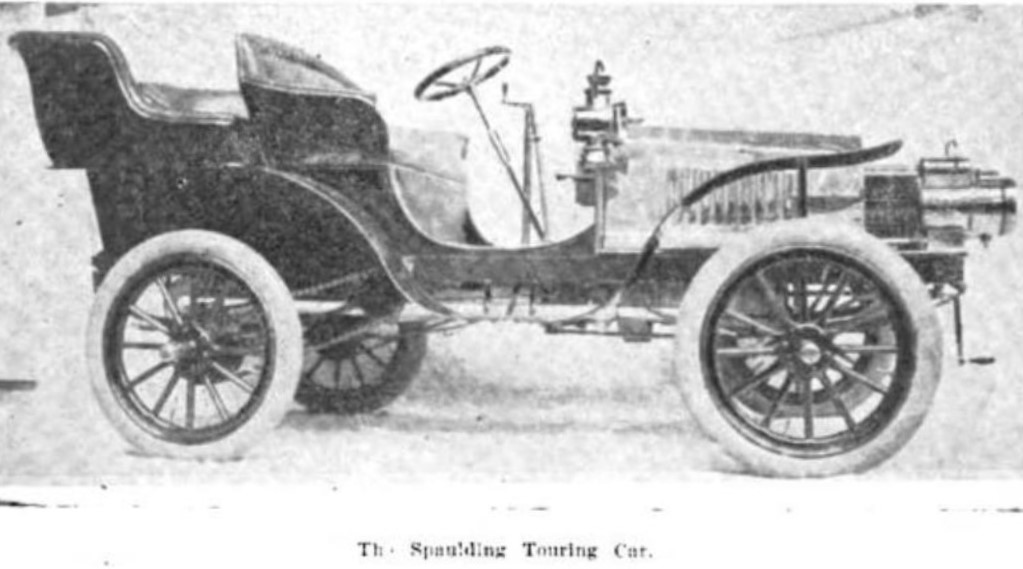
1903 Spaulding Touring Car in Cycle and Automobile Trade Journal

== Spaulding (1910–1916) ==
Spaulding Manufacturing Company
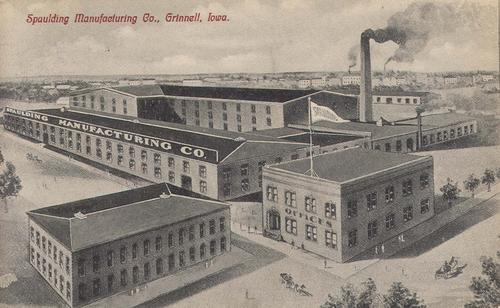
- Spaulding Manufacturing factory from a 1910 postcard
- Industry: Coachbuilder, Automotive
- Founded: 1876; 150 years ago
- Founder: Henry Washington Spaulding
- Defunct: 1929; 97 years ago
- Fate: Closed
- Headquarters: Grinnell, Iowa, United States
- Key people: Henry W. Spaulding, Frederick E. Spaulding, Ernest H. Spaulding
- Products: Automobiles
- Production output: 1,481 (1910-1916)

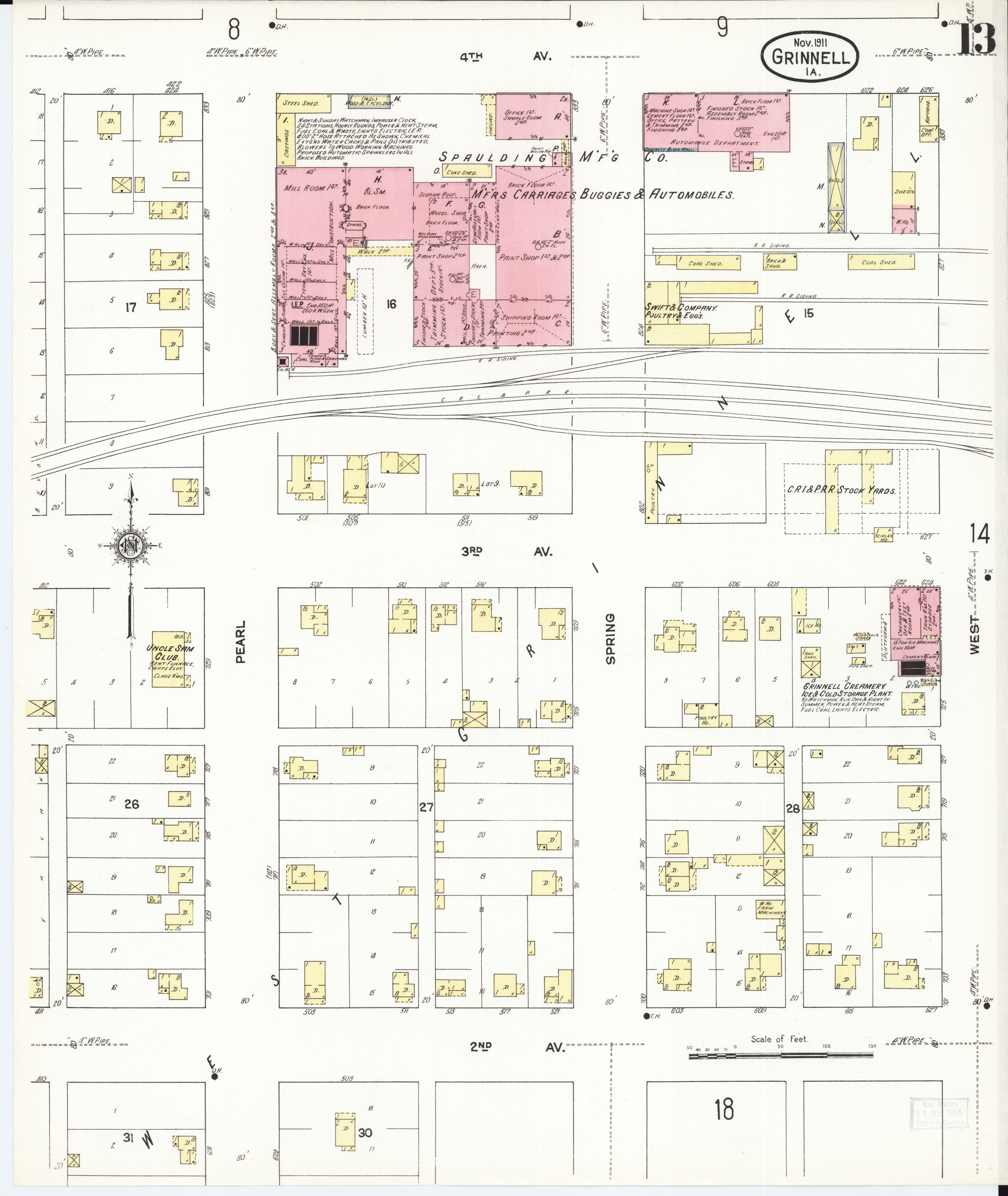
Spaulding plant (1911)

Henry W. Spaulding arrived in Iowa in 1876 where he set up shop as a blacksmith and carriage manufacturer in Grinnell. At the turn of the century the Spaulding Manufacturing Company was the oldest and largest producer of vehicles west of the Mississippi.

Henry Spaulding's sons, Frederick E. and Ernest H. joined their father in the family business. The Spaulding automobiles introduced in 1910 were a 30-hp Model C with three-speed sliding gear transmission and Model D with a two-speed planetary transmission. Rutenber was the primary engine supplier. The wheelbase was 112 inches, and the price $1,500, equivalent to $51,830 in 2025. These cars were sold through the Spaulding carriage agents.

In 1911 the Model D became a larger 122-inch wheelbase, $2,500 (equivalent to $86,384 in 2025) 40-hp car, which the Spauldings attempted, as Model G, to market through established automobile dealers. This did not work well and in 1912 Spaulding returned to using its carriage outlets almost exclusively.

In 1913 the Spaulding was revised as Model G with a 40 hp Buda four-cylinder engine on a 120- inch wheelbase. Electric lighting was later joined with electric starting. Called the Spaulding 40, and priced in the $1,800 (equivalent to $57,857 in 2025) range, it remained in this configuration until the end of automobile production.

In 1914 in traveling the River-to-River (Mississippi-to-Missouri) Road in what was claimed "a world's dirt-road speed record", Spaulding established a new cross-state speed record. The Panama-Pacific International Exposition selected a Spaulding the following year to map the overland route to the California exposition. The car traveled with a moving picture camera to film during its journey.

In 1915 Spaulding offered a model called the Sleeping Car (predating Nash by 20 years), which provided overnight accommodations. Difficulty in getting parts transported to Grinnell and under-financing caused the end for the Spaulding car in 1916. Spaulding Manufacturing had begun building truck bodies and this replaced car manufacturing. In the early Twenties the Spaulding Manufacturing Company was producing road machinery. The business closed in 1929. Henry W. Spaulding died in 1937 at the age of ninety-one.

Spaulding Models

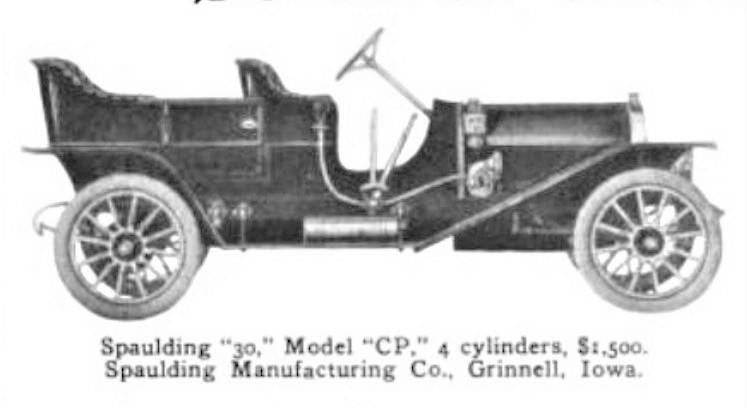
1910 Spaulding 30 Model CP in Motor magazine

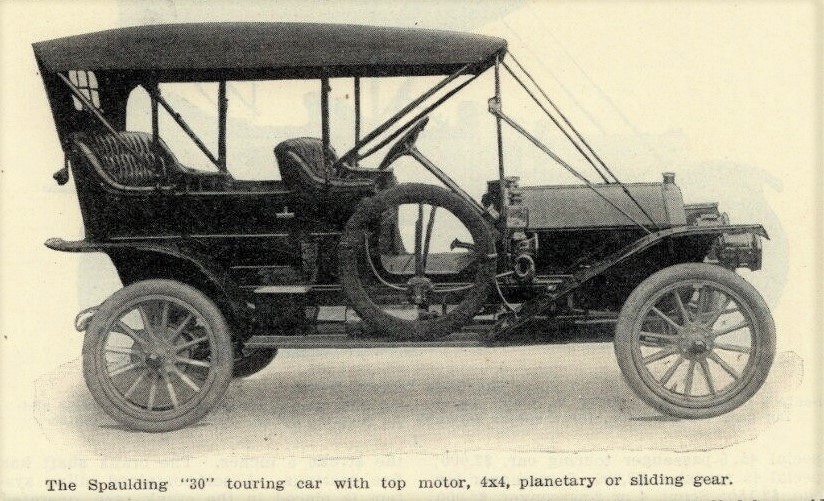
1911 Spaulding 30 from Cycle and Automobile Trade Journal

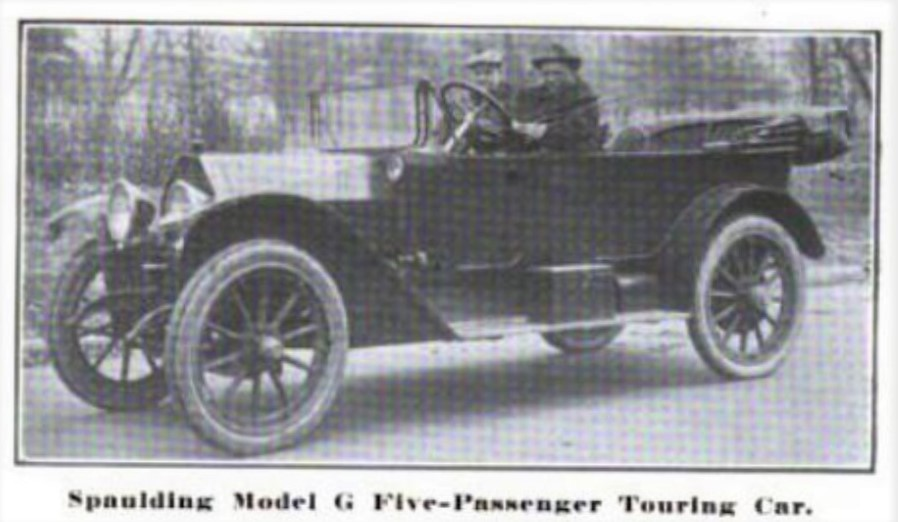
1913 Spaulding Model 40 from Automobile Trade Journal

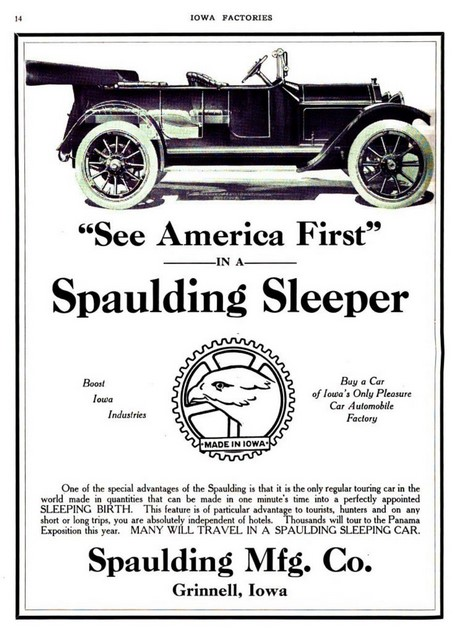
1914 Spaulding 40 Spaulding Sleeper from Iowa Factories Bulletin

== See also ==
- Spaulding Manufacturing Company
