= Stewart Library =

- Stewart Building
- U.S. National Register of Historic Places
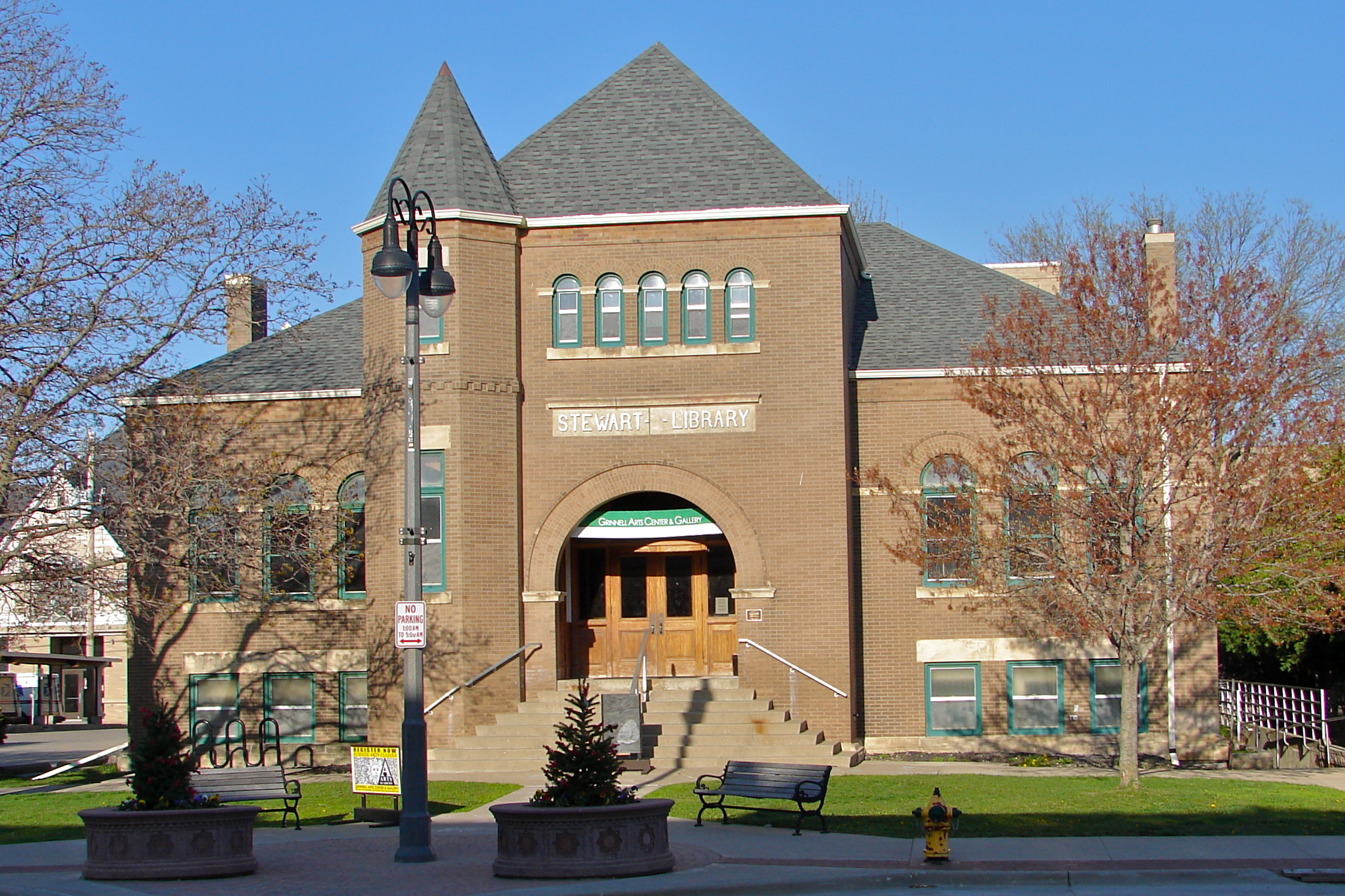

- Location within Iowa Location within the United States
- Location: 926 Broad St. Grinnell, Iowa
- Coordinates: 41°44′38″N 92°43′25″W
- Built: 1902
- Architectural style: Romanesque Revival
- NRHP reference No.: 76000806
- Added to NRHP: November 21, 1976

The Stewart Building, formerly home to Stewart Library and current home to the Grinnell Area Arts Council, is a historic building located in Grinnell, Iowa, United States. Joel Stewart was a farmer, banker, and state legislator who was known for his philanthropic activities. Included in these activities was the organization and construction of a public library for Grinnell. He planned for the structure, superintended the construction, and turned it over to the city free and clear. The library was dedicated on May 9, 1902. The three-story, brick building follows the Romanesque Revival style, and contains 5,458.8 square feet (510 m^{2}) of space. It served the community as the public library from the time it opened until November, 2009, when the library moved to the new Drake Community Library located at 930 Park Street. In 2009 the Grinnell Area Arts Council entered into an agreement with the city to rent the building once the new library building was completed. They took ownership of the building in July 2013 with the understanding that they would make the necessary infrastructure improvements. The meeting room on the top floor was converted into the Loft Theatre, and it opened in August 2014. It was listed on the National Register of Historic Places in 1976.
