= Tom Stewart (New Hampshire politician) =

American politician

Member-elect of the New Hampshire House of Representatives from the Hillsborough 41st district
- Assuming office December 2026
- Succeeding: Karen Hegner

Personal details
- Party: Democratic

Tom Stewart is an American politician. A member of the Democratic Party, he is the member-elect for the Hillsborough 41st district of the New Hampshire House of Representatives.
