= Pioneer Oil Company Filling Station =

- U.S. National Register of Historic Places
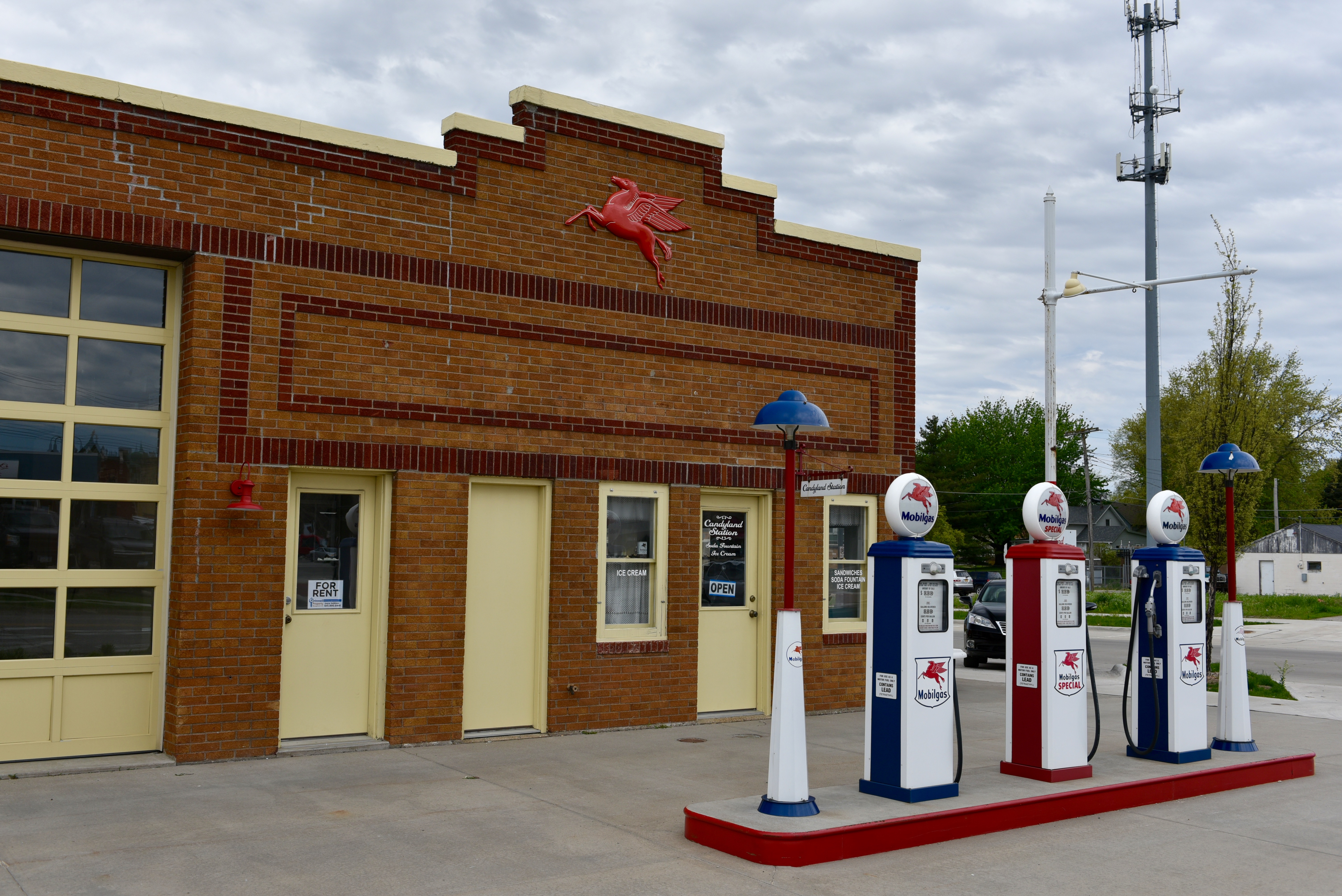

- Location within Iowa Location within the United States
- Location: 831 West St. Grinnell, Iowa
- Coordinates: 41°44′35″N 92°43′39″W
- Built: 1937
- Built by: L.0. Wilson
- Architectural style: Modern Movement
- NRHP reference No.: 13000070
- Added to NRHP: March 13, 2013

The Pioneer Oil Company Filling Station is a historic building located in Grinnell, Iowa, United States. The northern half of the building dates back to the 1920s when it was associated with a local farmers' cooperative. One of the services they provided was selling gasoline. The building was expanded in 1931 into a more traditional filling station as selling fuel became a more prominent part of the operation. The building attained its present appearance in 1937 when the service bays and the decorative brick veneer were added. It retained its original name, "Pioneer Oil Company," throughout its time as a service station even though it became affiliated with Mobilgas in 1936. That affiliation ended in 1962. During World War II it became a tire inspection center under the wartime tire rationing program. The service station ceased operations around 2004. The building was re-purposed into the Mobil Wash and Wax, an automotive detailing business located in the service bays, and the Candyland Cafe in the northern portion of the building. It was listed on the National Register of Historic Places in 2013.
