= Ludvig Hegner =

Danish composer

Ludvig Albert Hegner
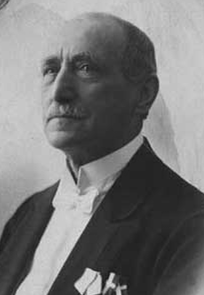
- Hegner in 1920
- Born: May 1, 1851; Copenhagen, Denmark
- Died: November 7, 1923 (aged 72); Copenhagen, Denmark
- Relatives: Anton Hegner (brother)
- Honours: Order of the Dannebrog

Ludvig Albert Hegner (1 May 1851 – 7 November 1923) was a Danish musician and composer.

== See also ==
- List of Danish composers
