= Spaulding Manufacturing Company =

- U.S. National Register of Historic Places
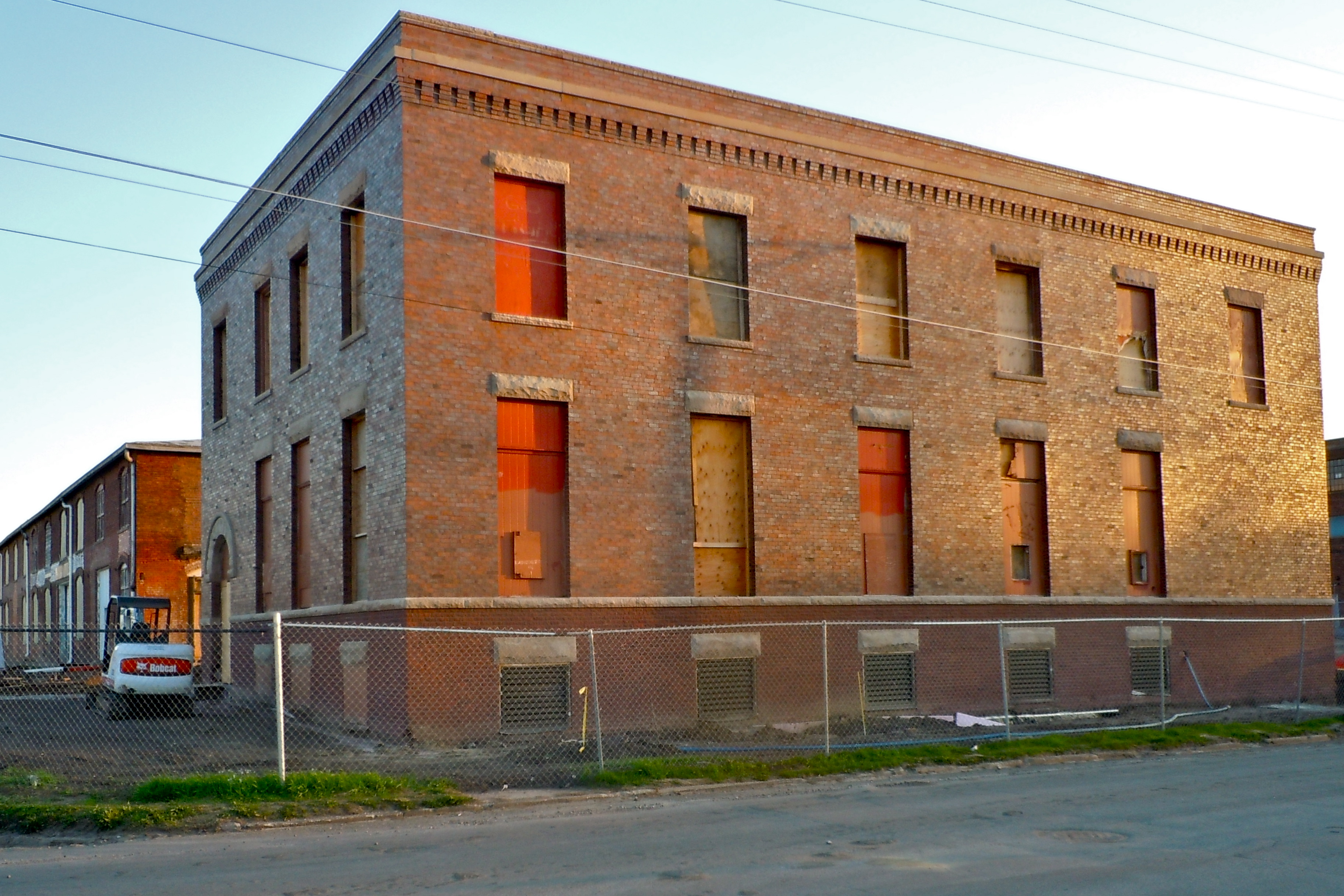

- Location within Iowa Location within the United States
- Location: 500-610 4th Ave. 827-829 Spring St. Grinnell, Iowa
- Coordinates: 41°44′34″N 92°43′45″W
- Built: c. 1880 to 1910
- NRHP reference No.: 78001257
- Added to NRHP: December 21, 1978

The Spaulding Manufacturing Company is a complex of historic buildings located in Grinnell, Iowa, United States. Vermont native H.W. Spaulding settled in Grinnell in 1876 to open a blacksmith and wagon repair shop. Not long after, he started to manufacture wagons. Because of his modest success he entered into a series of partnerships over the years. The oldest building in the complex was completed around 1880, and the company grew to a complex of five buildings. The last building was completed in 1910, and has a masonry chimney that originally rose to 110 feet (34 m) high. All the buildings are brick construction, and they range in height from two floors to three floors. As modes of transportation began to change, so did Spaulding. The company began manufacturing automobiles. They were one of several early automobile manufacturers that had existing operations that manufactured bicycles, wagons, and carriages. They went out of business in 1929. Since that time the facility has housed a variety of small-scale manufactures, and even a veterinary clinic. Part of the plant was renovated and now houses the administration offices for the City of Grinnell and displays for the Iowa Transportation Museum, which is now closed due to a variety of financial issues. The largest buildings of the manufacturing complex were renovated and converted into the Spaulding Lofts apartments. The complex was listed on the National Register of Historic Places in 1978.
