= Grinnell, Iowa =

City in Iowa, United States

- City
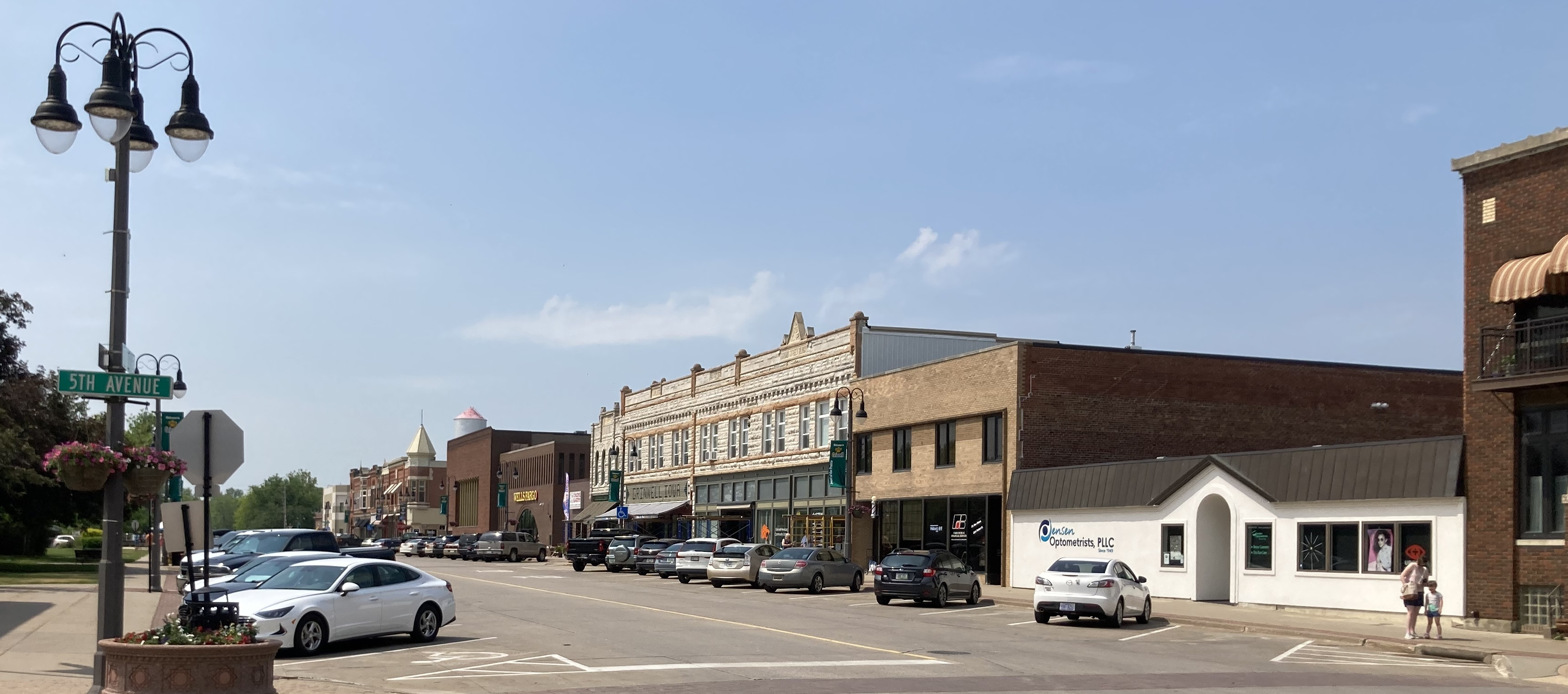
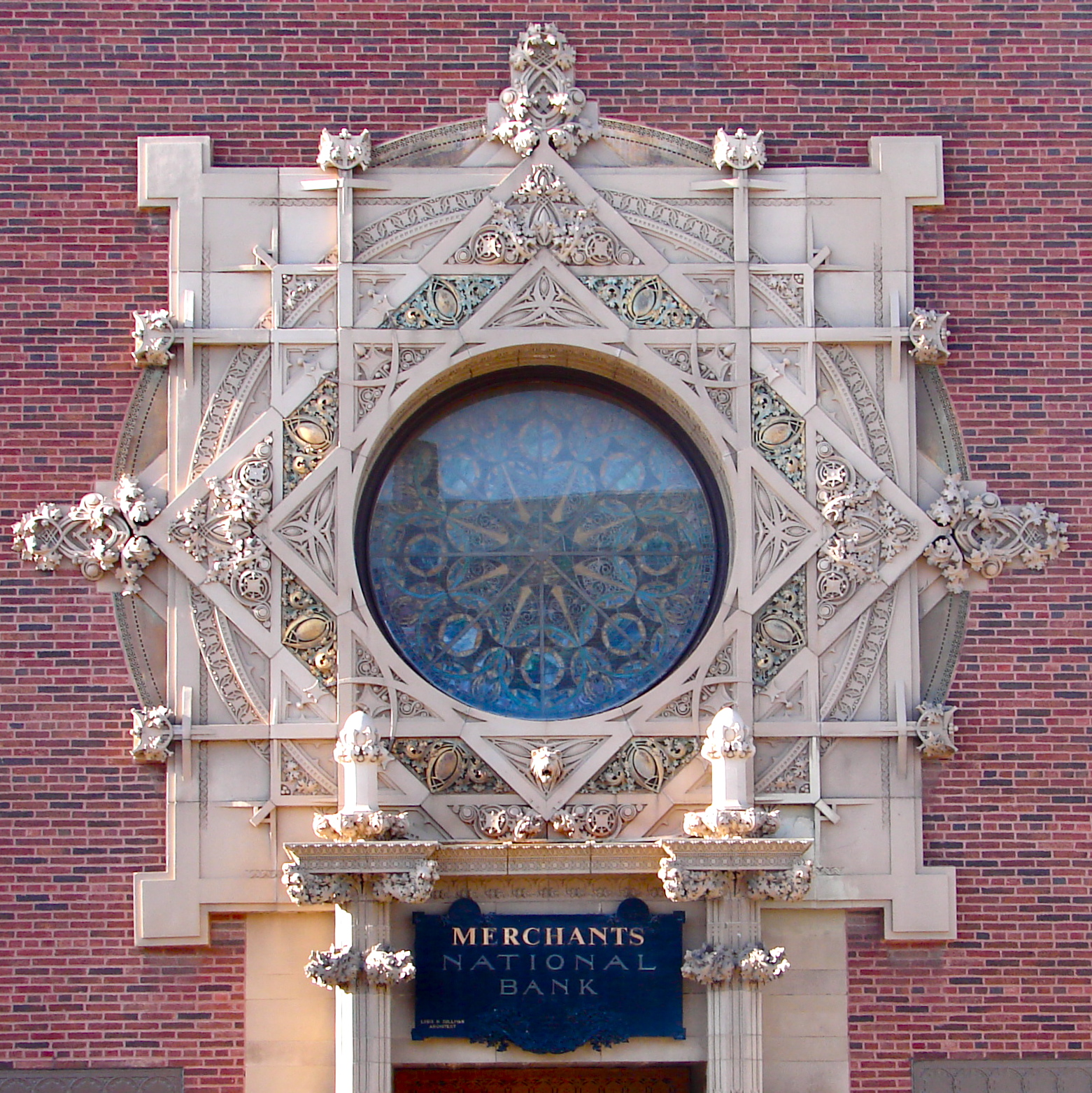
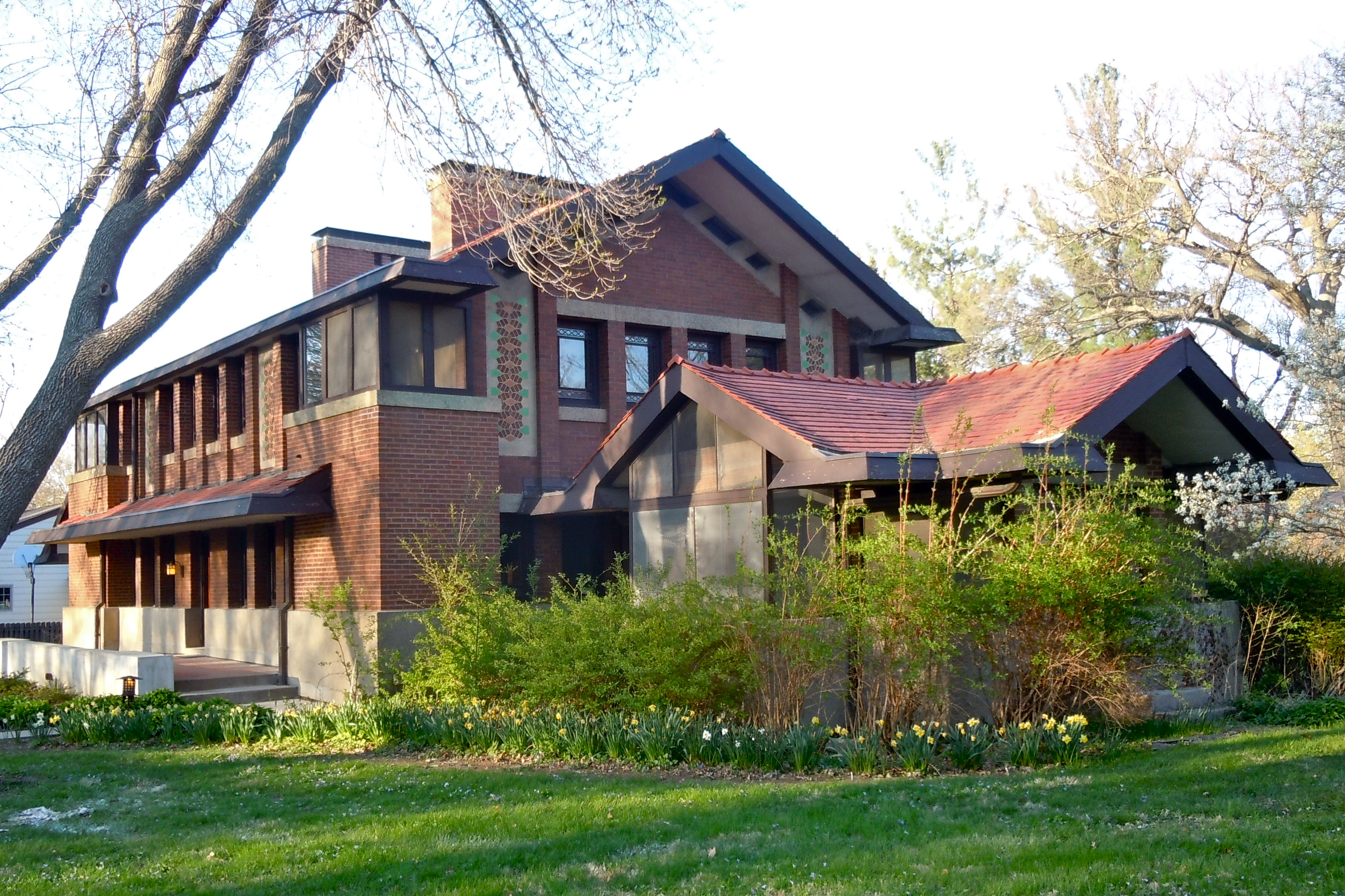
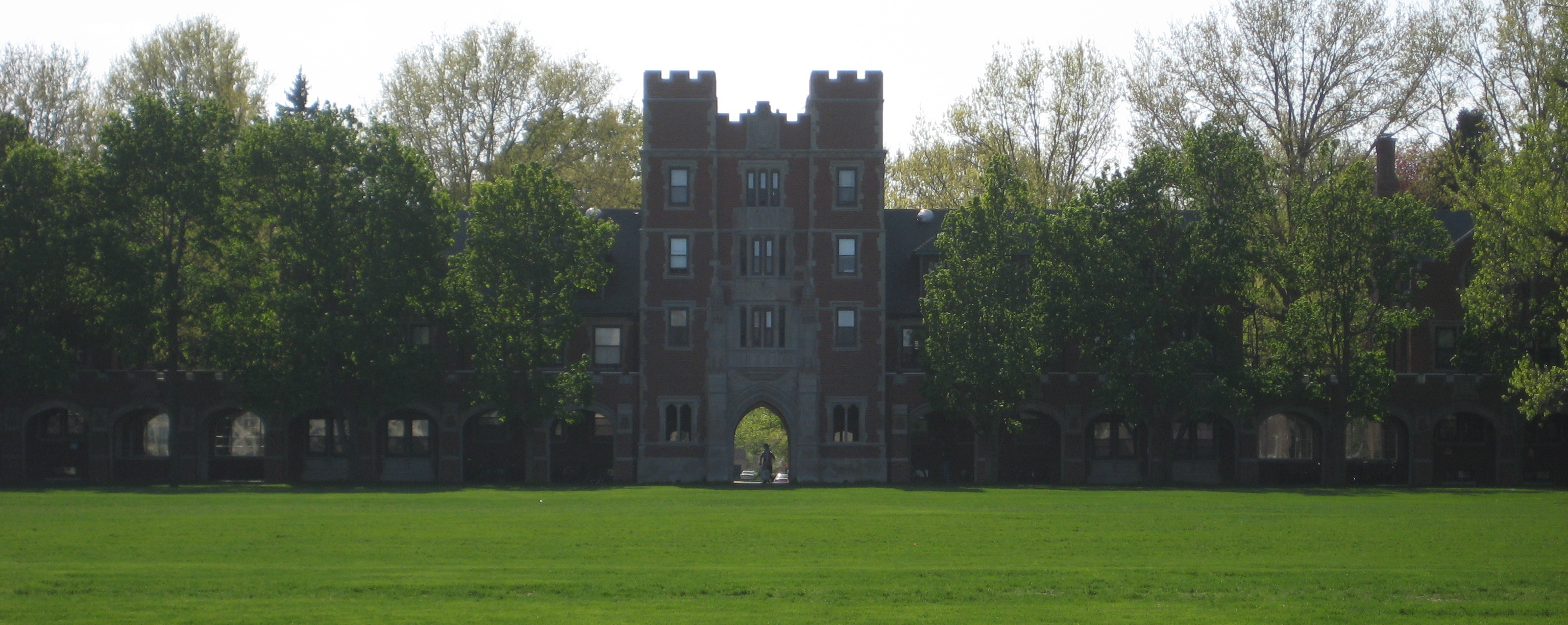
- Downtown Grinnell Merchants' National Bank Ricker House Grinnell College
- Motto: "Jewel of the Prairie"
- Location of Grinnell, Iowa

- Location in the United States
- Coordinates: 41°44′37″N 92°43′29″W
- Country: United States
- State: Iowa
- County: Poweshiek

Area
  - Total: 5.73 sq mi (14.84 km^{2})
  - Land: 5.69 sq mi (14.74 km^{2})
  - Water: 0.042 sq mi (0.11 km^{2})
- Elevation: 1,014 ft (309 m)

Population (2020)
  - Total: 9,564
  - Density: 1,681.1/sq mi (649.06/km^{2})
- Time zone: UTC−6 (Central (CST))
  - Summer (DST): UTC−5 (CDT)
- ZIP Codes: 50112, 50177
- Area code: 641
- FIPS code: 19-33105
- GNIS feature ID: 0457150
- Website: grinnelliowa.gov

Grinnell (/ɡrɪˈnɛl/ grin-EL) is a city in Poweshiek County, Iowa, United States. The population was 9,564 at the time of the 2020 census. It is the home of Grinnell College, a liberal arts college.

== History ==
Grinnell was founded by settlers from New England who were descended from English Puritans of the 1600s. Grinnell was founded in 1854 by four men: Josiah B. Grinnell, a Congregationalist from Vermont; Homer Hamlin, a minister; Henry Hamilton, a surveyor; and Dr. Thomas Holyoke. The city was to be named "Stella", but J. B. Grinnell convinced the others to adopt his name, describing it as rare and concise. Grinnell was incorporated on April 28, 1865, and by 1880, Grinnell had a population of around 2,000. Located at the junction of two railway lines (east–west line of the Rock Island Railroad and the north–south Minneapolis and St. Louis Railway), it is the largest community in Poweshiek County.

Grinnell was a stop on the Underground Railroad from its founding. One of the most famous events occurred in February 1859, when abolitionist John Brown, and 12 slaves he was helping escape to freedom, were hosted by J. B. Grinnell and several other community residents. Because of J. B. Grinnell's efforts to help slaves and end slavery, in 2013, the National Park Service included his gravesite at Hazelwood Cemetery on the National Underground Railroad Network to Freedom listings.

The Mormon Trail ran along the southern edge of Grinnell. The trail was traveled by an estimated 100,000 plus travelers from 1846 to 1869, including some 70,000 Mormons escaping religious persecution. The Pioneer Company of 1846–1847 established the first route; from Nauvoo, Illinois, to Salt Lake City. A stone marker memorializes the Mormon Handcart Trail and the grave of a child who died along the trail near Grinnell.

In 1846, Grinnell College, a private liberal arts college, was established.

Two major events marked the early years of the community. On June 17, 1882, a violent, estimated, F5 tornado destroyed most of the college campus and much of the community with a death toll of 68, causing up to $1.3 million in total damages (in 1882 USD). In June 1889, fire destroyed most of the downtown area.

Grinnell was home to the Spaulding Manufacturing Company. H. W. Spaulding began making carriages and spring wagons in Grinnell in 1876. In 1909, Spaulding Manufacturing added automobiles to its production line. At one time, the factory was the largest employer in the county. Automobile production ceased at the Spaulding factory in 1916 when it could no longer compete with the cheaper Ford automobile. The Spaulding factory site became home to the Spaulding Center for Transportation/Iowa Transportation Museum, as well as a 77 unit loft apartment complex which opened in 2017.

=== Downtown renovations ===
In the spring of 2005, Grinnell embarked upon a renovation project to make its downtown area more inviting. It encompassed new water mains, restoration of two-way traffic flow, brick crosswalks in the middle of each block, and more uniform parking spaces in front of downtown businesses. A median strip at each intersection was designed with Grinnell's distinctive Jewel Box pattern. Infrastructure upgrades and aesthetic renovations were also planned for the southern section of the downtown area, to include Commercial Street. Downtown street improvements have continued, and as of 2016, nearly all downtown streets have been redone. Improvements have been made to many business facades. Central Park underwent a major makeover during the summer of 2016, relocating the gazebo and adding a bandstand, public restrooms, and a large group picnic enclosure. In September 2017, Grinnell's first independently owned, boutique hotel (Hotel Grinnell) opened downtown across from Central Park giving visitors luxury accommodations.

== Geography ==
According to the United States Census Bureau, the city has a total area of 5.64 square miles (14.61 km^{2}), of which 5.60 square miles (14.50 km^{2}) is land and 0.04 square miles (0.10 km^{2}) is water.

=== Climate ===
Grinnell has a humid continental climate with hot humid summers, and cold snowy winters. The precipitation averages 38.19 in (970 mm) yearly. Summers are the rainiest times of year, with over two thirds of the precipitation falling between April and September in an average year.

Climate data for Grinnell, Iowa, 1991–2020 normals, extremes 1893–present
Month	Jan	Feb	Mar	Apr	May	Jun	Jul	Aug	Sep	Oct	Nov	Dec	Year
Record high °F (°C)	64 (18)	74 (23)	90 (32)	92 (33)	107 (42)	105 (41)	108 (42)	110 (43)	101 (38)	95 (35)	82 (28)	69 (21)	110 (43)
Mean maximum °F (°C)	49.5 (9.7)	56.6 (13.7)	72.0 (22.2)	81.5 (27.5)	85.2 (29.6)	91.1 (32.8)	93.7 (34.3)	92.7 (33.7)	88.6 (31.4)	81.9 (27.7)	68.0 (20.0)	53.4 (11.9)	95.2 (35.1)
Mean daily maximum °F (°C)	28.3 (−2.1)	33.0 (0.6)	46.1 (7.8)	59.4 (15.2)	69.9 (21.1)	79.5 (26.4)	83.3 (28.5)	81.2 (27.3)	75.2 (24.0)	62.3 (16.8)	46.8 (8.2)	34.0 (1.1)	58.3 (14.6)
Daily mean °F (°C)	19.3 (−7.1)	23.3 (−4.8)	35.4 (1.9)	47.3 (8.5)	58.5 (14.7)	68.6 (20.3)	72.5 (22.5)	70.2 (21.2)	62.7 (17.1)	50.2 (10.1)	36.6 (2.6)	25.2 (−3.8)	47.5 (8.6)
Mean daily minimum °F (°C)	10.2 (−12.1)	13.6 (−10.2)	24.7 (−4.1)	35.1 (1.7)	47.1 (8.4)	57.8 (14.3)	61.8 (16.6)	59.2 (15.1)	50.2 (10.1)	38.2 (3.4)	26.4 (−3.1)	16.3 (−8.7)	36.7 (2.6)
Mean minimum °F (°C)	−12.7 (−24.8)	−9.4 (−23.0)	5.0 (−15.0)	18.6 (−7.4)	31.2 (−0.4)	42.0 (5.6)	48.6 (9.2)	46.6 (8.1)	32.3 (0.2)	21.0 (−6.1)	9.7 (−12.4)	−7.9 (−22.2)	−18.3 (−27.9)
Record low °F (°C)	−34 (−37)	−35 (−37)	−17 (−27)	1 (−17)	19 (−7)	35 (2)	40 (4)	36 (2)	21 (−6)	2 (−17)	−15 (−26)	−32 (−36)	−35 (−37)
Average precipitation inches (mm)	1.10 (28)	1.55 (39)	2.22 (56)	3.90 (99)	5.09 (129)	5.53 (140)	3.96 (101)	4.37 (111)	3.71 (94)	3.21 (82)	1.95 (50)	1.60 (41)	38.19 (970)
Average snowfall inches (cm)	9.0 (23)	9.1 (23)	3.4 (8.6)	0.6 (1.5)	0.0 (0.0)	0.0 (0.0)	0.0 (0.0)	0.0 (0.0)	0.0 (0.0)	0.5 (1.3)	1.5 (3.8)	6.9 (18)	31 (79.2)
Average precipitation days (≥ 0.01 in)	7.6	7.7	8.9	11.8	12.9	12.2	9.4	10.6	8.8	9.5	7.4	8.2	115
Average snowy days (≥ 0.1 in)	5.3	5.2	2.5	0.7	0.0	0.0	0.0	0.0	0.0	0.2	1.1	5.0	20
Source 1: NOAA
Source 2: National Weather Service

== Demographics ==
Historical population
Census	Pop.	Note	%±
1860	392		—
1870	1,482		278.1%
1880	2,415		63.0%
1890	3,332		38.0%
1900	3,856		15.7%
1910	5,036		30.6%
1920	5,362		6.5%
1930	4,949		−7.7%
1940	5,219		5.5%
1950	6,828		30.8%
1960	7,367		7.9%
1970	8,402		14.0%
1980	8,868		5.5%
1990	8,902		0.4%
2000	9,105		2.3%
2010	9,218		1.2%
2020	9,564		3.8%
Iowa Data Center

=== 2020 census ===
As of the 2020 census, there were 9,564 people, 3,724 households, and 1,991 families residing in the city. The population density was 1,681.1 inhabitants per square mile (649.1/km^{2}). There were 4,039 housing units at an average density of 709.9 per square mile (274.1/km^{2}).

The median age was 35.5 years. 17.6% of residents were under the age of 18 and 20.6% were 65 years of age or older. 25.1% of residents were under the age of 20; 14.6% were between the ages of 20 and 24; 19.3% were from 25 to 44; 20.4% were from 45 to 64; and 20.6% were 65 years of age or older. For every 100 females there were 90.4 males, and for every 100 females age 18 and over there were 87.0 males age 18 and over. The gender makeup of the city was 47.5% male and 52.5% female.

99.2% of residents lived in urban areas, while 0.8% lived in rural areas.

Of the 3,724 households, 23.4% had children under the age of 18 living in them. Of all households, 39.3% were married-couple households, 6.3% were cohabiting-couple households, 20.2% were households with a male householder and no spouse or partner present, and 34.1% were households with a female householder and no spouse or partner present. About 46.5% of households were non-families, 39.4% were made up of individuals, and 18.2% had someone living alone who was 65 years of age or older.

There were 4,039 housing units, of which 7.8% were vacant. The homeowner vacancy rate was 1.8% and the rental vacancy rate was 8.9%.

Racial composition as of the 2020 census
Race	Number	Percent
White	8,464	88.5%
Black or African American	311	3.3%
American Indian and Alaska Native	32	0.3%
Asian	206	2.2%
Native Hawaiian and Other Pacific Islander	21	0.2%
Some other race	111	1.2%
Two or more races	419	4.4%
Hispanic or Latino (of any race)	357	3.7%

=== 2010 census ===
As of the census of 2010, there were 9,218 people, 3,567 households, and 2,026 families residing in the city. The population density was 1,646.1 inhabitants per square mile (635.6/km^{2}). There were 3,844 housing units at an average density of 686.4 per square mile (265.0/km^{2}). The racial makeup of the city was 91.9% White, 2.0% African American, 0.3% Native American, 2.7% Asian, 0.2% Pacific Islander, 0.8% from other races, and 2.1% from two or more races. Hispanic or Latino of any race were 3.2% of the population.

There were 3,567 households, of which 27.1% had children under the age of 18 living with them, 43.4% were married couples living together, 10.4% had a female householder with no husband present, 3.0% had a male householder with no wife present, and 43.2% were non-families. Of all households 36.8% were made up of individuals, and 16.4% had someone living alone who was 65 years of age or older. The average household size was 2.16 and the average family size was 2.82.

The median age in the city was 35.6 years. 19% of residents were under the age of 18; 21.4% were between the ages of 18 and 24; 18.4% were from 25 to 44; 21.9% were from 45 to 64; and 19.1% were 65 years of age or older. The gender makeup of the city was 47.3% male and 52.7% female.

=== 2000 census ===
As of the census of 2000, there were 9,105 people, 3,498 households, and 2,067 families residing in the city. The population density was 1,825.7 inhabitants per square mile (704.9/km^{2}). There were 3,725 housing units at an average density of 746.9 per square mile (288.4/km^{2}). The racial makeup of the city was 94.88% White, 1.04% African American, 0.29% Native American, 2.01% Asian, 0.10% Pacific Islander, 0.37% from other races, and 1.31% from two or more races. Hispanic or Latino of any race were 1.57% of the population.

There were 3,498 households, out of which 27.5% had children under the age of 18 living with them, 47.2% were married couples living together, 9.5% had a female householder with no husband present, and 40.9% were non-families. Of all households, 34.7% were made up of individuals, and 16.4% had someone living alone who was 65 years of age or older. The average household size was 2.23 and the average family size was 2.84.

In the city, the population was spread out, with 20.5% under the age of 18, 19.9% from 18 to 24, 22.2% from 25 to 44, 19.0% from 45 to 64, and 18.5% who were 65 years of age or older. The median age was 35 years. For every 100 females, there were 85.6 males. For every 100 females age 18 and over, there were 80.7 males.

The median income for a household in the city was $35,625, and the median income for a family was $48,991. Males had a median income of $33,956 versus $23,864 for females. The per capita income for the city was $17,939. About 8.9% of families and 13.3% of the population were below the poverty line, including 16.1% of those under age 18 and 8.1% of those age 65 or over.

== Economy ==
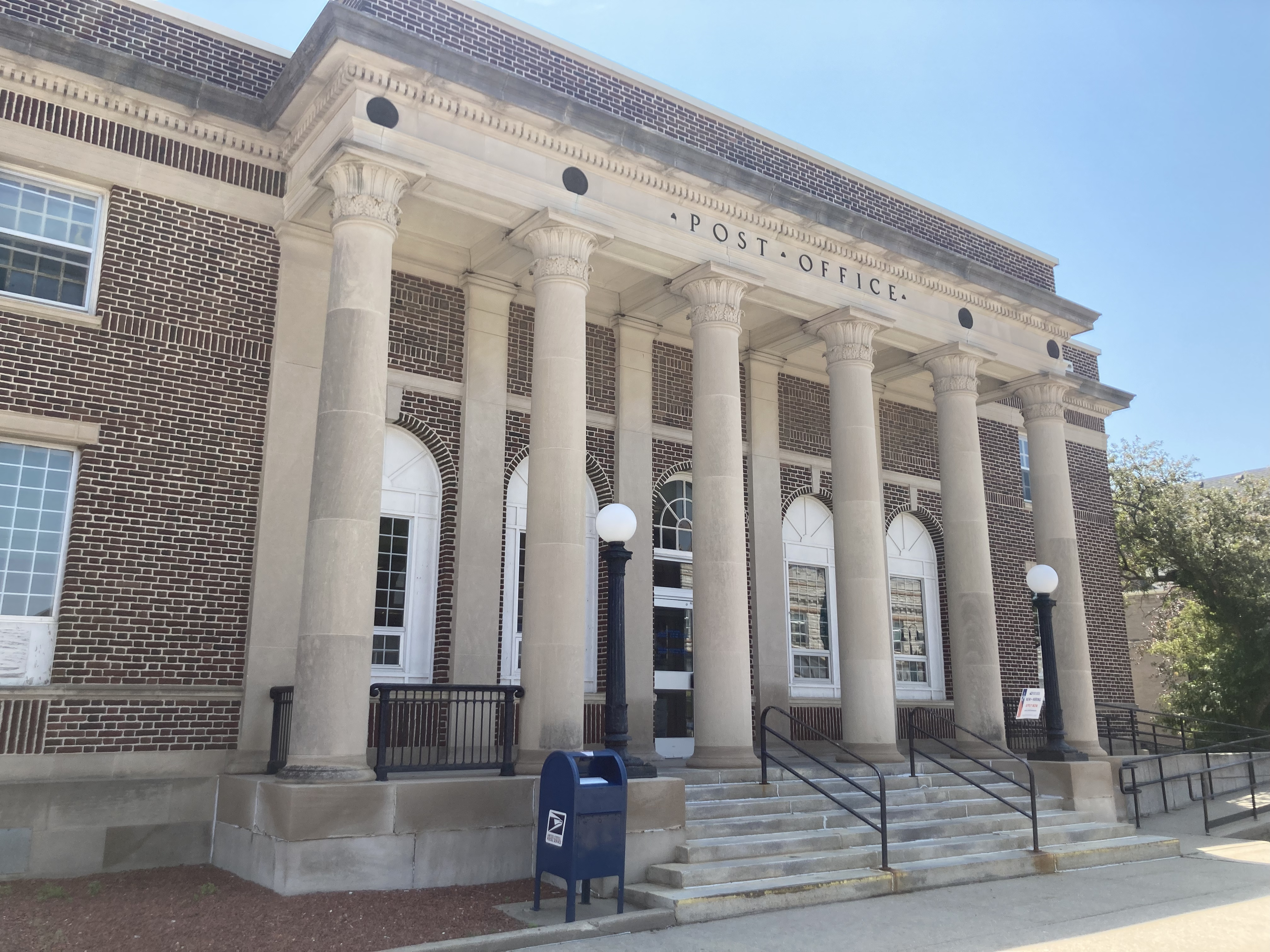
Post office

In addition to Grinnell College, other major employers include Grinnell Mutual Reinsurance Company, Grinnell Regional Medical Center, JELD-WEN.

Grinnell is home to two growing retirement communities, the Mayflower community in the middle of town and Seeland Park on the eastern edge. Both communities include housing options for independent living, including duplexes and apartments, and also assisted living accommodations.

== Arts and culture ==
=== Arts ===
- The Grinnell Area Arts Council (GAAC) began in 1979 and sponsors many of the creative projects in Grinnell, including various community theater plays, the community band and a summer arts camp. Each season, the GAAC offers a variety of different classes including theater classes, crafts classes, and language classes. GAAC also sponsors various events throughout the year, such as Music in the Park, a free event offered to community members. The Turlach Ur bagpipe band is also a program of GAAC. The Grinnell Arts Center is housed in the renovated old library building. It includes a gallery on the main floor and a small theater performance space on the top level.
- The Grinnell College Museum of Art at Grinnell College showcases exhibitions of artists in a 7,400 square feet space situated in the heart of Grinnell College's Bucksbaum Center for the Arts. Exhibitions by members of the Grinnell College art faculty can be seen throughout the year, and in May, the annual Student Art Salon features student work.

=== Architecture ===
Grinnell has several notable architectural landmarks: Among them, includes the Merchants' National Bank, designed by architect Louis Sullivan in 1914. The bank is one in a series of small banks, referred to as "Jewel Boxes" designed by Sullivan in the Midwest. The Ricker House was designed by Walter Burley Griffin Marion Mahony Griffin in 1911 and completed in 1912. It was the first of seven houses the Griffins designed for Iowa clients, six of which were built and the other five of which are in Mason City. Ricker House was purchased by Grinnell College in 2000 and is operated as a short-term residence for guests of the college for several years. The house was sold in 2019 and became a private residence.

=== Festivals and events ===
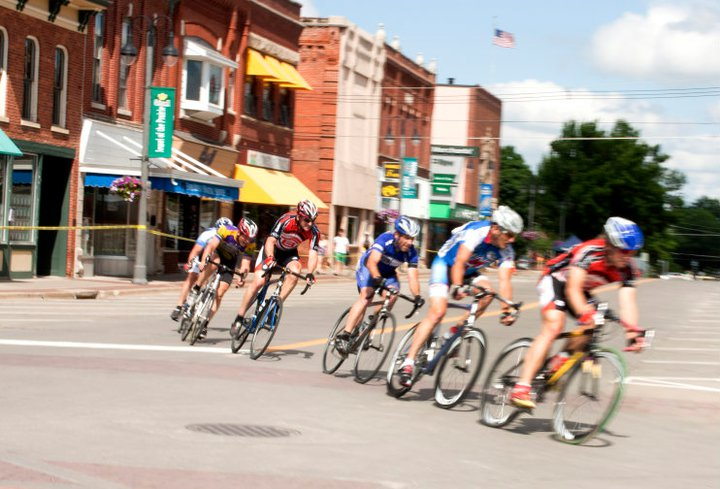
Grinnell Games Criterium

The 'Grinnell Games is a weekend family sports festival. Community-organized events include Imagine Grinnell's Half Marathon and 5K Run, the Twilight Bike Criterium, The Amazing Chase, Twilight Trail Run, and the Warrior Run. Grinnell Games draws visitors from across the state with its family-friendly activities, sidewalk sales, live music, and a beer garden on Saturday night.

=== Library ===
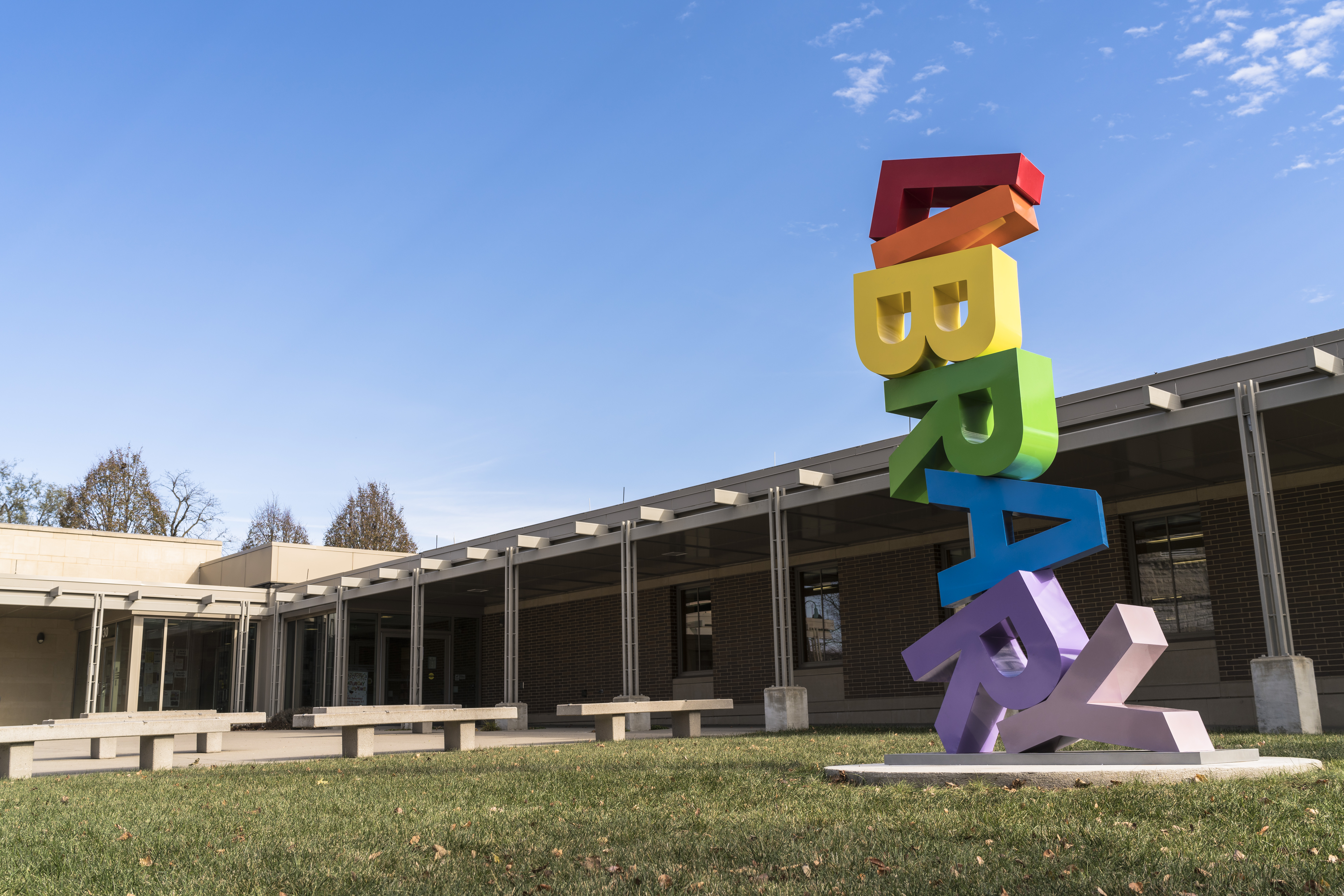
Drake Community Library

Drake Community Library opened in November 2009. The library serves as a center of community activities. It has 25 public computers, 3 large meetings rooms, two small study rooms, a variety of seating areas and offers a full range of reading and AV materials. The library is actively working to create a digital archive of local history and make archived photos and documents available on their website. A wide range of photos and documents are available for viewing as part of Digital Grinnell and the Poweshiek History Preservation Project. Area residents can also use the Grinnell College Libraries. In 1901, Joel Stewart funded the construction of the first library in Grinnell, the Stewart Library, which served in that capacity until 2009. The building remains in service today as the headquarters for the Grinnell Area Arts Council. The library also has many eco-friendly structures like clerestory for natural light, flooring and furniture made from recycled materials, water-saving fixtures, permeable pavers, and native landscaping.

=== Museums and art galleries ===
Grinnell Historical Museum was founded as a community collaborative effort through a contest for community development by the Grinnell Herald Register in 1950. Four women's groups—two chapters of the DAR, the Historical and Literary Club, and the Tuesday Club, took as their project the creation of a museum. People responded enthusiastically; donations included a rope bed, a hair wreath, and the twisted bell clapper from the ruins of the first High School, which had burned. The house the museum is currently situated in was generously donated by Rubie Burton. Displays are of interest to visitors of all ages. The kitchen holds an electric refrigerator made by the Grinnell Washing Machine Company, one of the first 50 made in 1932. There is a Military exhibit with uniforms from the Civil War to the Vietnam war. The Carriage House holds several horse-drawn vehicles built by the Spaulding Carriage Factory in Grinnell.

The Grinnell Area Arts Council building includes the Stewart Gallery, which features works of local and regional artists, and the Loft Theater, the location of the Grinnell Community Theater. The nearby Stew Makerspace features ceramics, woodworking, 3D printing, metal working, and laser engraving.

The Faulconer Gallery (now called the Grinnell College Museum of Art) on the Grinnell College campus features year-round exhibits of regional, national and international artists. The space is inside the Bucksbaum Center for the Arts.

== Parks and recreation ==
Grinnell has nine parks that are run by Parks and Recreations, including Arbor Lake, Bailey Park, Central Park, Jaycee Park, Lions Park, Merrill Park, Miller Park, Thomazin Park, and Van Horn Park. Ahrens and Paschall Memorial Park is privately run by the Claude & Dolly Ahrens Foundation. The city boasts three aquatic centers. A small indoor pool is part of the Ahrens Family Center. The Grinnell Mutual Family Aquatic Center is open during the summer months. Area residents also have access to the College Natatoriaum Grinnell and other college athletic facilities.

== Education ==
The first school in Grinnell was founded in 1855. Public schools within the Grinnell–Newburg Community School District include Fairview Elementary School (K-2nd grade for the eastern side of town), Bailey Park Elementary School (K–2nd grade for the western side of town), Davis School (3rd–4th grade), Grinnell–Newburg Middle School (5th–8th grade) and Grinnell–Newburg High School (9th–12th grade). There is one private school, Central Iowa Christian School, which enrolls about 35 students in kindergarten through eighth grade. Grinnell is home to Grinnell College, a private liberal arts college. Iowa Valley Community College also operates a satellite campus on the western edge of Grinnell.

== Media ==
The Grinnell Herald-Register is a semi-weekly newspaper in Grinnell, Iowa. It was formed on February 13, 1936, after the merger of the Grinnell Herald and Grinnell Register. The Herald was founded on August 16, 1871, as a semi-weekly newspaper, and the Register was founded in 1888. The Grinnell Herald, in turn, was founded as the Poweshiek County Herald on March 18, 1868.

The Poweshiek County Chronicle Republican – often referred to as the Poweshiek County CR or simply The CR – was created in January 2009 as the result of a merger of two newspapers serving other communities in Poweshiek County, the Brooklyn Chronicle and the Montezuma Republican; the Pennysaver, a shopper that had operated in Grinnell, continued, and the new newspaper began incorporating Grinnell news along with its existing coverage of rural Poweshiek County and its communities.

=== Radio ===
Freq	Call	Owner	Start	ERP (W)	Nickname	Format	RDS	HD
106.7	KRTI	Newton License Co, LLC	1993	50,000	Energy 106.7	Hot AC		

Freq	Call	Owner	Start	Day Power (W)	Night Power	Nickname	Format	Stereo	HD
1410	KGRN	Grinnell License Co, LLC	1957-2024	500	47	AM 1410 Stereo	Full Service, adult contemporary	Yes	No

== Infrastructure ==
=== Transportation ===
==== Highways ====
- Interstate 80 to Davenport and Des Moines
- U.S. Route 6 to Iowa City and Des Moines
- Iowa Highway 146 to Le Grand and New Sharon

==== Rail ====
Feight-only railroad lines include the:

- Union Pacific Oskaloosa Subdivision from Marshalltown to Eddyville; the line sees three trains per day.
- Iowa Interstate Railroad mainline from Council Bluffs to Bureau Junction, Illinois, and on to Chicago; the line sees about two trains per day.

The two lines meet in a diamond in Grinnell.

==== Airport ====
The Grinnell Regional Airport, also known as Billy Robinson Field, is a city-owned airport. The airport provides private and charter flights, and saw an average of 114 aircraft operations per week in 2019.

=== Health care ===
Unity Point Grinnell, formerly Grinnell Regional Medical Center, is an acute care hospital licensed for 81 beds. The hospital was established in 1967 after the merger of two hospitals.

== Notable people ==
- John O. Bailey (1880–1959), judge and politician who served as the Chief Justice of the Oregon Supreme Court, was born in Grinnell and attended local schools before enrolling at Harvard University.
- Bruce Braley (born 1957), former member of the U.S. House of Representatives for Iowa's 1st congressional district, was born in Grinnell.
- Pete Brownell (born 1969), CEO of Brownell's Inc. and President of the National Rifle Association of America from May 2017 to May 2018.
- Cornelia Clarke (1884-1936), nature photographer
- Jeff Criswell (born 1964), offensive lineman who played twelve seasons in the National Football League, was born in Grinnell.
- Kirby Criswell (born 1957), linebacker who played two seasons in the National Football League, was born and raised in Grinnell and attended Grinnell High School.
- John Darnielle (born 1967), musician and novelist, the main creative force behind The Mountain Goats.
- Josiah Bushnell Grinnell (1821–1891), city founder and abolitionist to whom Horace Greeley is quoted as having said: "Go West, young man, go West." This story is almost certainly apocryphal, as Greeley claimed that he never said those words to anyone.
- Danai Gurira, actress, known for her role as Michonne in the hit television series The Walking Dead and as Okoye in the Marvel Cinematic Universe.
- Hallie Flanagan (1890–1969), Federal Theater Project head, grew up in Grinnell and also attended Grinnell College.
- Abby Williams Hill (1861-1943) - artist
- Harry Hopkins (1890–1946), one of President Franklin D. Roosevelt's advisors and New Deal architect, lived in Grinnell as a teenager before attending Grinnell College.
- Joe Lacina (born 1985), artist.
- Helen Lemme (1904–1968), civil rights advocate.
- David R. Nagle (born 1943), Democratic member of the U.S. House of Representatives from 1987 to 1993, was born in Grinnell.
- Robert Noyce (1927–1990), physicist and inventor who co-founded Fairchild Semiconductor and Intel Corporation, he grew up in Grinnell and attended Grinnell College.
- Bernard E. Pedersen (1925–1996), Illinois businessman and legislator, was born in Grinnell.
- Billy Robinson (1884–1916), pioneer aviator, moved to Grinnell at the age of 12.
- Edith Renfrow Smith (1914–2026), first Black woman to graduate from Grinnell College.
