= Karen Hegner =

American politician

Member of New Hampshire House of Representatives for Hillsborough 41
- Incumbent
- Assumed office December 4, 2024
- Succeeded by: Tom Stewart (elect)

Personal details
- Party: Democratic
- Education: Plymouth State University

Karen Hegner is an American politician. She is a member of the New Hampshire House of Representatives.

Hegner was raised in Meredith and attended Plymouth State University. She moved to Manchester in 2012 to work in the title insurance industry.
