= Anton Hegner =

Danish cellist and composer

Anton Henger
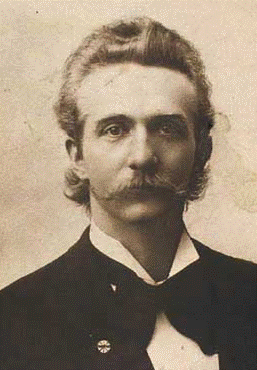
- Born: 2 March 1861; Copenhagen, Denmark
- Died: 4 December 1915 (aged 54); New York City, US
- Relatives: Ludvig Hegner (brother)
- Honours: Order of the Dannebrog

Anton Hegner (2 March 1861 – 4 December 1915) was a Danish cellist and composer.

== Life ==
Hegner was born in Denmark and started his musical career as a violinist, but changed to the cello as he was educated at the Royal Danish Academy of Music, from where he graduated in 1879.

He moved to New york in 1893. He was often back in Europe, however, often playing at the various courts and concert halls around the continent. During visits to the Danish court he sometimes played together with members of the Danish, Russian and British royal families.

He was appointed a Knight of the Order of the Dannebrog in 1902.

== See also ==
- List of Danish composers
