= Franz Hegner =

Swiss pentathlete

Personal information
- Born: 18 September 1919 Bern, Switzerland
- Died: 30 January 1983 (aged 63) Bern, Switzerland

Sport
- Sport: Modern pentathlon

Franz Hegner (18 September 1919 – 30 January 1983) was a Swiss modern pentathlete. He competed at the 1948 Summer Olympics.
