= UnityPoint Health - Grinnell Regional Medical Center =

Coordinates: 41.742°N 92.734°W

Exterior shot of Grinnell Regional Medical Center

UnityPoint Health - Grinnell Regional Medical Center (GRMC) is an American private, nonprofit and non-tax supported 49-bed rural community hospital in Grinnell, Iowa. With 50 physicians and allied healthcare professionals, 400 employees, and more than 300 volunteers, it serves an estimated 47,000 residents in east-central Iowa in the counties of Poweshiek, Jasper, Benton, Iowa, Mahaska, and Tama. GRMC is located at 210 Fourth Avenue in Grinnell.

In 2019 the hospital became affiliated with the UnityPoint Health care system.

GRMC is licensed by the Iowa Department of Inspections and Appeals. GRMC maintains an Area (Level III) trauma center. In 2010, 2012, and 2013, GRMC was named a top rural hospital by the Leapfrog Group in its annual class of top hospitals. GRMC was one of 65 hospitals—from a field of nearly 1,200—to earn the designation. In 2013, it was recognized by AARP and the Leapfrog group for innovations in error prevention, and given an A in patient safety. In 2015, it received the Iowa Healthcare Collaborative Patient Safety Award, for working to reduce early elective infant deliveries, and the Women's Choice Award for emergency care.

== Organization ==
Care System Medicare, Medicaid, Private, Charity

== Hospital Type ==
Medicare Disproportionate Share hospital, Tweener hospital, rural community hospital.

== Affiliations ==
- eICU, Saint Luke's Hospital of Kansas City
- Cardiology Care, Iowa Heart Center
- Imaging, Iowa Radiology
- Dialysis, University of Iowa
- Surgery, Surgical Associates

== Services and physician specialties ==
The medical staff at Grinnell Regional Medical Center includes physicians and practice providers (including Nurse Practitioners) in family practice, emergency medicine, hospitalist, radiology, and general surgery. Additional services include:

- Anesthesiology and pain management
- Audiology
- Cardiology
- Cancer care
- Dermatology
- Ear, Nose, and Throat
- Internal Medicine
- Home Care
- Hospice
- Maternity services
- Mental health
- Neurology
- Obstetrics
- Ophthalmology
- Orthopedics
- Perinatalogy
- Physical medicine and rehabilitation
- Podiatry
- Public health
- Pulmonology
- Sleep Medicine
- Urology
- Weight-loss surgery

== Clinics ==
Grinnell Regional Medical Center operates four general practice medical clinics in Grinnell, Lynnville, Toledo, and Victor, Iowa. Postels Community Health Park in downtown Grinnell is an integrated therapies clinic offering acupuncture, chiropractic, massage therapy, and oriental medicine. There is also an exercise center with equipment sized for children and youth, and the University of Iowa Healthcare Dialysis Center.

There are 13 clinics operated in the immediate area by medical professionals serving GRMC. Grinnell Regional Public Health offers a free medical clinic, the Community Care Clinic, for persons who are uninsured or underinsured. This clinic is staffed by volunteer medical providers and public health staff.

== Integrated medicine ==
In 1999, Poweshiek County, Iowa was selected for an international wellness consortium to study well communities and how to better integrate community health resources. In addition to Poweshiek County, the other communities were Chicago, IL., Munich, Germany, and Bolzano, Italy. The purpose of the study was to evaluate whether integrated medicine produced improved health compared to traditional medicine alone. Throughout the project, the organizers looked at everything that contributes to a well community, including physical, mental, spiritual, and environmental issues. According to Team Line Up, the GRMC employee newsletter at the time, the consortium "identified Poweshiek County as the best rural site for such a study. The interest of the community in improving health status, its strategic location, diverse population, intellectual base, academic and medical resources, and business strength were important factors supporting this choice."

Postels Community Health Park opened in 2001 at Broad Street and Commercial Avenue in downtown Grinnell. The healthcare providers located in the health park are also credentialed to provide care within the hospital. These include acupuncture, chiropractic, hypnotherapy, massage therapy, and oriental medicine, featured in a September 2008 USA Today article.

GRMC operates two exercise facilities. The Paul W. Ahrens Fitness and Rehabilitation Center is located in the Ahrens Medical Arts Building on the GRMC campus. This facility provides a complete selection of cardio equipment, free weights, and weight machines. This facility is supervised by wellness staff and medical supervision for rehabilitation purposes.

GRMC's Fitness and Wellness Center also offers programs at Postels Community Health Park in downtown Grinnell including group fitness classes such as aerobics, yoga, kickboxing, Pilates, Spinning, strength training, and Zumba.

GRMC provides training for its employees and area businesses in HeartMath, a technique for stress and emotional management.

== National designations ==
Level 1 designation from the American College of Surgeons for bariatric weight-loss surgery. Named a top rural hospital for the Leapfrog group in 2010, 2012, and 2013. Won the Women's Choice Award in 2015.
