= Robert William Hegner =

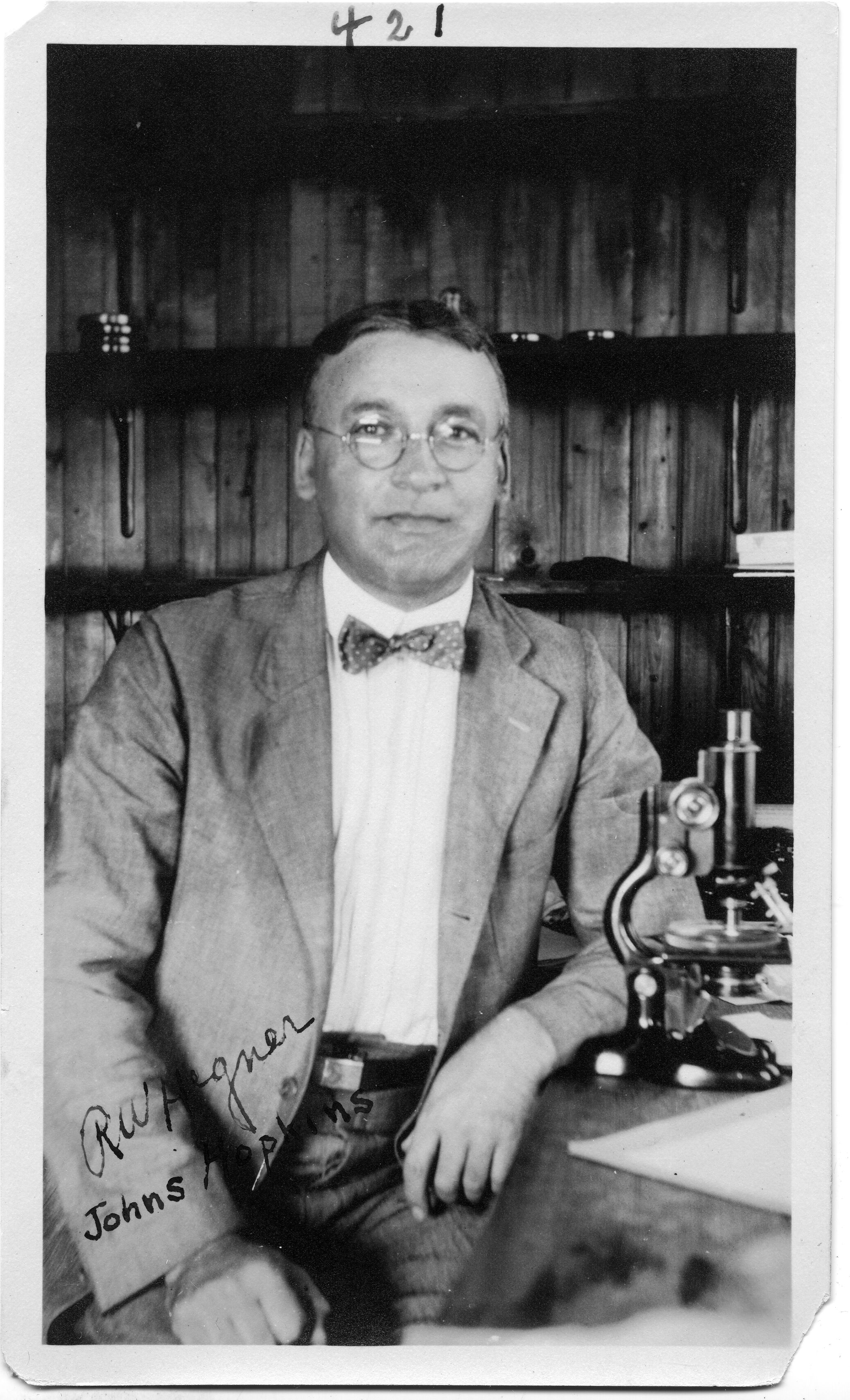

Robert William Hegner (February 15, 1880 – March 11, 1942) was a pioneer American parasitologist. He wrote and produced several editions of a prominent textbook of zoology and developed parasitology research at the Johns Hopkins University where he served as professor of protozoology and head of the department of medical zoology from 1922.

== Life and work ==
Hegner was born in Decorah, Iowa, and as a boy he took a keen interest in birds and their photography. He graduated from Lyons' Institute, Chicago, before going to the University of Chicago to receive an AB in 1903 and an MS in 1904. He then worked as an assistant in the zoology department and went on an expedition to Mexico. He also spent summers in Woods Hole at the Marine Biological Laboratory. He received a PhD from the University of Wisconsin in 1908 with a thesis on the origin and early history of the germ cells in some chrysomelid beetles. He then worked at the University of Michigan and wrote a textbook on zoology in 1910 which was revised as College Zoology in 1912 which went into five editions in his life. He was a Johnston Scholarship recipient in 1917-18 at the zoology department of the Johns Hopkins University and worked on protozoa, particularly Arcella dentata. He became interested in parasitology and joined the school of hygiene and public health in 1918. He developed the field of parasitology at the university. He supervised forty doctoral students in his career. He travelled widely and worked in tropical America, the Philippines (where he helped establish a protozoology laboratory) and in Mexico. He served as a visiting professor at the London School of Tropical Medicine in 1926. He served as editor of protozoology for the Journal of Parasitology and was an editor for the Quarterly Review of Biology. He studied malaria and amoebic dysentery among other medical topics. Among his ideas was that flagellates like Giardia were killed off when their hosts had a carnivorous diet. He received an honorary doctoral degree from the Mount Union College.
