= New Sharon, Iowa =

- City
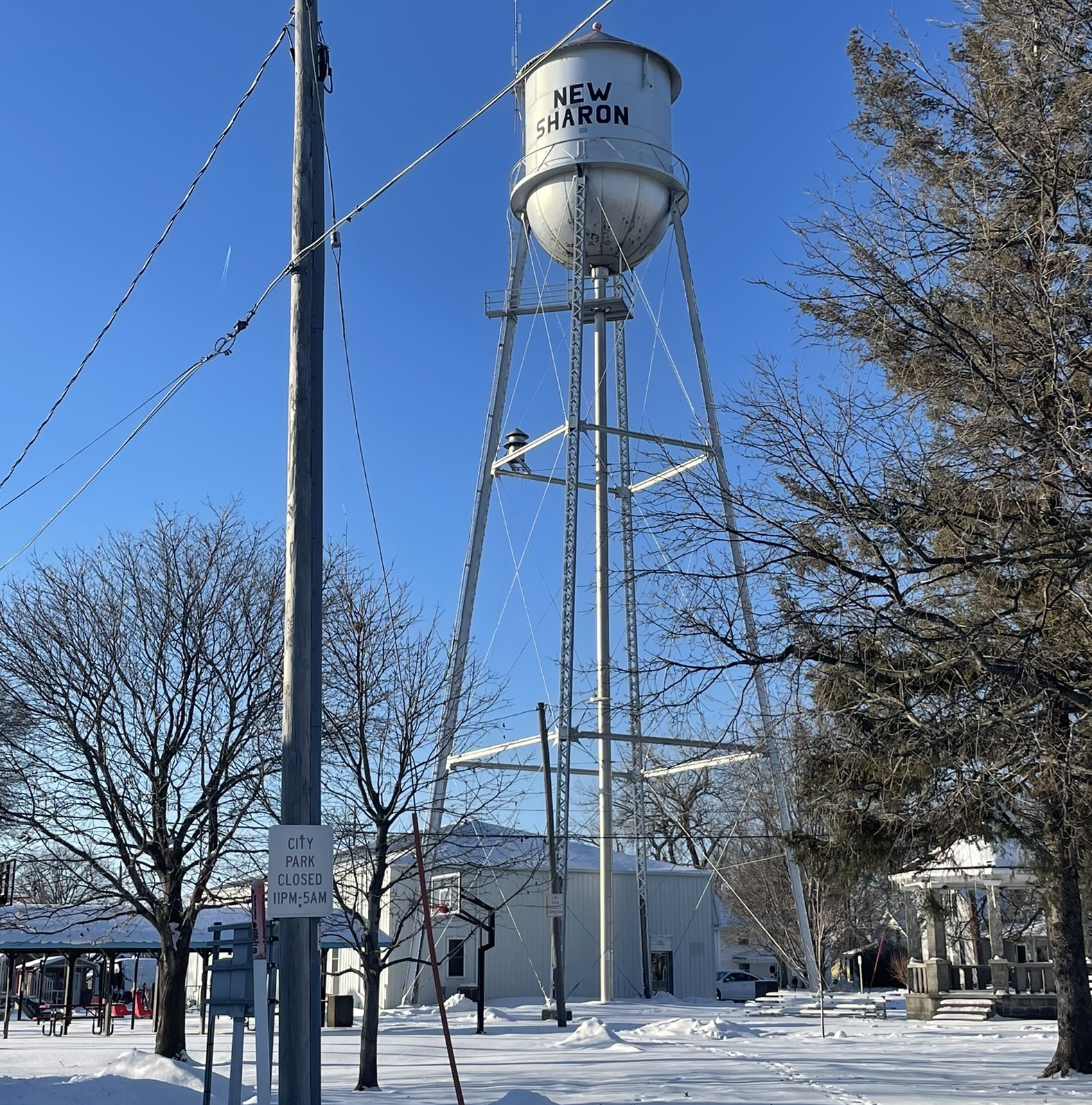
- Water Tower in New Sharon

- Location of New Sharon, Iowa
- Coordinates: 41°28′12″N 92°39′03″W
- Country: United States
- State: Iowa
- County: Mahaska
- Incorporated: July 1, 1871

Area
  - Total: 0.94 sq mi (2.44 km^{2})
  - Land: 0.94 sq mi (2.44 km^{2})
  - Water: 0 sq mi (0.00 km^{2})
- Elevation: 876 ft (267 m)

Population (2020)
  - Total: 1,262
  - Density: 1,340.6/sq mi (517.59/km^{2})
- Time zone: UTC-6 (Central (CST))
  - Summer (DST): UTC-5 (CDT)
- ZIP code: 50207
- Area code: 641
- FIPS code: 19-56460
- GNIS feature ID: 2395214
- Website: newsharoniowa.com

New Sharon is a city in Mahaska County, Iowa, United States. The population was 1,262 at the time of the 2020 census. The first building was erected in 1856 by Edward Quaintance.

== Geography ==
According to the United States Census Bureau, the city has a total area of 0.94 square miles (2.43 km^{2}), all of it land.

== Demographics ==
Historical populations
Year	Pop.	±%
1880	805	—
1890	1,026	+27.5%
1900	1,252	+22.0%
1910	1,122	−10.4%
1920	1,084	−3.4%
1930	1,052	−3.0%
1940	1,214	+15.4%
1950	1,089	−10.3%
1960	1,063	−2.4%
1970	944	−11.2%
1980	1,225	+29.8%
1990	1,136	−7.3%
2000	1,301	+14.5%
2010	1,293	−0.6%
2020	1,262	−2.4%
Source:"U.S. Census website". United States Census Bureau. and Iowa Data Center; Source: U.S. Decennial Census

=== 2020 census ===
As of the 2020 census, there were 1,262 people, 528 households, and 346 families residing in the city. The population density was 1,340.6 inhabitants per square mile (517.6/km^{2}). There were 581 housing units at an average density of 617.2 per square mile (238.3/km^{2}).

The median age in the city was 40.3 years. 24.6% of residents were under the age of 18, and 21.2% were 65 years of age or older. 26.5% of residents were under the age of 20; 4.8% were between the ages of 20 and 24; 23.5% were from 25 to 44; and 24.0% were from 45 to 64. For every 100 females, there were 90.6 males, and for every 100 females age 18 and over there were 90.2 males age 18 and over.

Of the 528 households, 31.4% had children under the age of 18 living with them, 51.5% were married-couple households, 4.9% were cohabitating-couple households, 26.9% had a female householder with no spouse or partner present, and 16.7% had a male householder with no spouse or partner present. 34.5% of all households were non-families. About 29.4% of all households were made up of individuals, and 16.7% had someone living alone who was 65 years of age or older.

There were 581 housing units, of which 9.1% were vacant. The homeowner vacancy rate was 1.5%, and the rental vacancy rate was 6.6%.

0.0% of residents lived in urban areas, while 100.0% lived in rural areas.

Racial composition as of the 2020 census
Race	Number	Percent
White	1,200	95.1%
Black or African American	4	0.3%
American Indian and Alaska Native	4	0.3%
Asian	3	0.2%
Native Hawaiian and Other Pacific Islander	0	0.0%
Some other race	5	0.4%
Two or more races	46	3.6%
Hispanic or Latino (of any race)	18	1.4%

=== 2010 census ===
As of the census of 2010, there were 1,293 people, 538 households, and 368 families living in the city. The population density was 1,375.5 inhabitants per square mile (531.1/km^{2}). There were 590 housing units at an average density of 627.7 per square mile (242.4/km^{2}). The racial makeup of the city was 99.1% White, 0.4% Native American, and 0.5% from two or more races. Hispanic or Latino people of any race were 0.3% of the population.

There were 538 households, of which 30.5% had children under the age of 18 living with them, 57.8% were married couples living together, 7.1% had a female householder with no husband present, 3.5% had a male householder with no wife present, and 31.6% were non-families. 27.7% of all households were made up of individuals, and 13.7% had someone living alone who was 65 years of age or older. The average household size was 2.40 and the average family size was 2.90.

The median age in the city was 41.8 years. 25.2% of residents were under the age of 18; 6.4% were between the ages of 18 and 24; 22% were from 25 to 44; 28.2% were from 45 to 64; and 18.1% were 65 years of age or older. The gender makeup of the city was 48.5% male and 51.5% female.

=== 2000 census ===
As of the census of 2000, there were 1,301 people, 540 households, and 361 families living in the city. The population density was 1,390.9 inhabitants per square mile (537.0/km^{2}). There were 575 housing units at an average density of 614.7 per square mile (237.3/km^{2}). The racial makeup of the city was 98.92% White, 0.08% Native American, 0.54% Asian, 0.15% Pacific Islander, and 0.31% from two or more races. Hispanic or Latino people of any race were 0.69% of the population.

There were 540 households, out of which 30.7% had children under the age of 18 living with them, 56.9% were married couples living together, 8.1% had a female householder with no husband present, and 33.1% were non-families. 30.7% of all households were made up of individuals, and 17.8% had someone living alone who was 65 years of age or older. The average household size was 2.30 and the average family size was 2.87.

In the city, the population was spread out, with 23.9% under the age of 18, 7.8% from 18 to 24, 23.9% from 25 to 44, 19.9% from 45 to 64, and 24.4% who were 65 years of age or older. The median age was 41 years. For every 100 females, there were 84.0 males. For every 100 females age 18 and over, there were 82.3 males.

The median income for a household in the city was $36,125, and the median income for a family was $42,829. Males had a median income of $33,125 versus $21,739 for females. The per capita income for the city was $17,280. About 7.8% of families and 10.0% of the population were below the poverty line, including 15.4% of those under age 18 and 8.7% of those age 65 or over.

== Government ==
New Sharon is governed by a mayor-city council form of government. The residents elect five at-large council members and one mayor. Each serves a four-year term. Matt Comstock presides at the current town mayor.

== Education ==
New Sharon is home to North Mahaska Community School District schools. This is a rural school district serving nearly 600 students in grades Pre-K through 12. Located adjacent to the schools is the North Mahaska Community School District Early Childhood education center, which opened in 2009. This houses pre-school classes for three- and four-year-olds, as well as the New Sharon Child Care and Preschool (NSCCP).
