= Iowa Highway 85 =

Highway in Iowa

Iowa Highway 85
- Iowa 85 highlighted in red

Route information
- Maintained by Iowa DOT
- Length: 8.408 mi (13.531 km)
- Existed: 1920–present

Major junctions
- West end: Main Street at the eastern city limits of Montezuma
- East end: Iowa 21 / CR F52 east of Deep River

Location
- Country: United States
- State: Iowa
- Counties: Poweshiek

Highway system
- Iowa Primary Highway System; Interstate; US; State; Secondary; Scenic
← Iowa 83	→ Iowa 86

Iowa Highway 85 (Iowa 85) is a short state highway in east-central Iowa. The route begins at the eastern city limit of Montezuma and ends at Iowa 21 east of Deep River. Created in 1920 as a spur route connecting What Cheer to Primary Road No. 2, it is an original route in the Iowa primary highway system. In the early 1930s, the route was extended north to Deep River and west to Montezuma. By the end of the decade, Iowa 21 had taken over the north–south portion of the route. Except for both endpoints shifting slightly, Iowa 85 has largely stayed the same since the 1930s.

== Route description ==
Iowa 85 begins at the eastern city limit of Montezuma. It heads east through the rolling farmland of Poweshiek County. Near the midpoint of the route, it intersects County Road V18 (CR V18). As it approaches Deep River, the route briefly curves to the north-northeast before turning to the southeast. The terrain becomes hillier as the route crosses a creek leading to the eponymous river just north of Deep River. On the south side of Deep River, Iowa 85 turns back to the east. It ends one-half mile (0.80 km) east of Deep River at an intersection with Iowa 21.

== History ==
Primary Road No. 85 was created in 1920 with the advent of Iowa's primary highway system. At the time, it was a short spur route connecting What Cheer to Primary Road No. 2 in Keokuk County. In 1931, Iowa 85 was significantly lengthened north to Deep River and west to US 63 in Montezuma. In 1939, the route was shortened to its east–west section between Montezuma and Deep River as Iowa 21 was extended and it supplanted Iowa 85 south of Deep River.

Iowa 85 was paved in the mid-1950s; until then, the highway had been a gravel road. In the early 1960s, Iowa 21 was straightened through Keokuk County near Guernsey and Deep River. This caused the eastern end of Iowa 85 to move east back to the point where it had turned into an east–west route in the 1930s. The route would remain this way for nearly thirty years. In 1994, the westernmost one mile (1.6 km) of Iowa 85 was turned over to the City of Montezuma. The route now begins at the eastern city limits. Along US 63, signs at the former intersection of Iowa 85 now say "To Iowa 85".

== Major intersections ==
The entire route is in Poweshiek County.

Location	mi	km	Destinations	Notes
Montezuma	0.000	0.000	Main Street to US 63	Begins at eastern city limits
Deep River Township	8.408	13.531	Iowa 21 / CR F52 – Millersburg, What Cheer, Belle Plaine	
1.000 mi = 1.609 km; 1.000 km = 0.621 mi
