= Ramsey Creek =

Ramsey Creek may refer to the following streams:

- Ramsey Creek (Iowa)
- Ramsey Creek (Minnesota)
- Ramsey Creek (Castor River Diversion Channel), a stream in Missouri
- Ramsey Creek (Mississippi River), a stream in Missouri
