= Holiday Lake, Iowa =

- Census-designated place
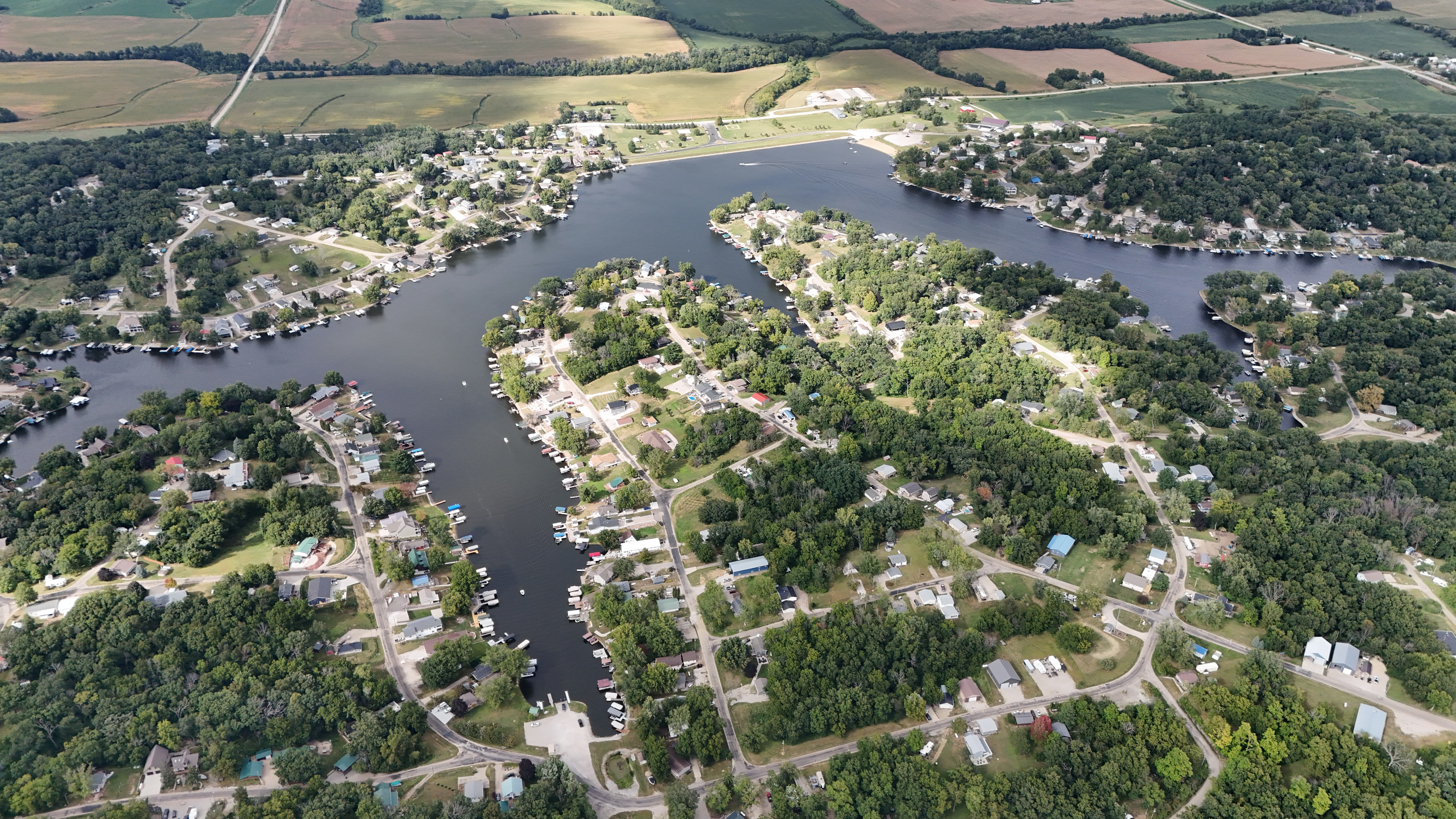
- Aerial View of Holiday Lake

- Location in Iowa
- Coordinates: 41°49′04″N 92°27′11″W
- Country: United States
- State: Iowa
- County: Poweshiek
- Township: Madison

Area
  - Total: 2.83 sq mi (7.33 km^{2})
  - Land: 2.68 sq mi (6.93 km^{2})
  - Water: 0.15 sq mi (0.40 km^{2})

Population (2020)
  - Total: 473
  - Density: 176.8/sq mi (68.26/km^{2})
- Time zone: Central (CST)
- ZIP code: 52211 Brooklyn, IA
- FIPS code: 19-36660

Holiday Lake is a census-designated place (CDP) located in Brooklyn Township in Poweshiek County in the state of Iowa, United States. As of the 2020 census the population was 473.

Holiday Lake is located 8 miles (13 km) north of the city of Brooklyn. The community surrounds a lake of the same name.

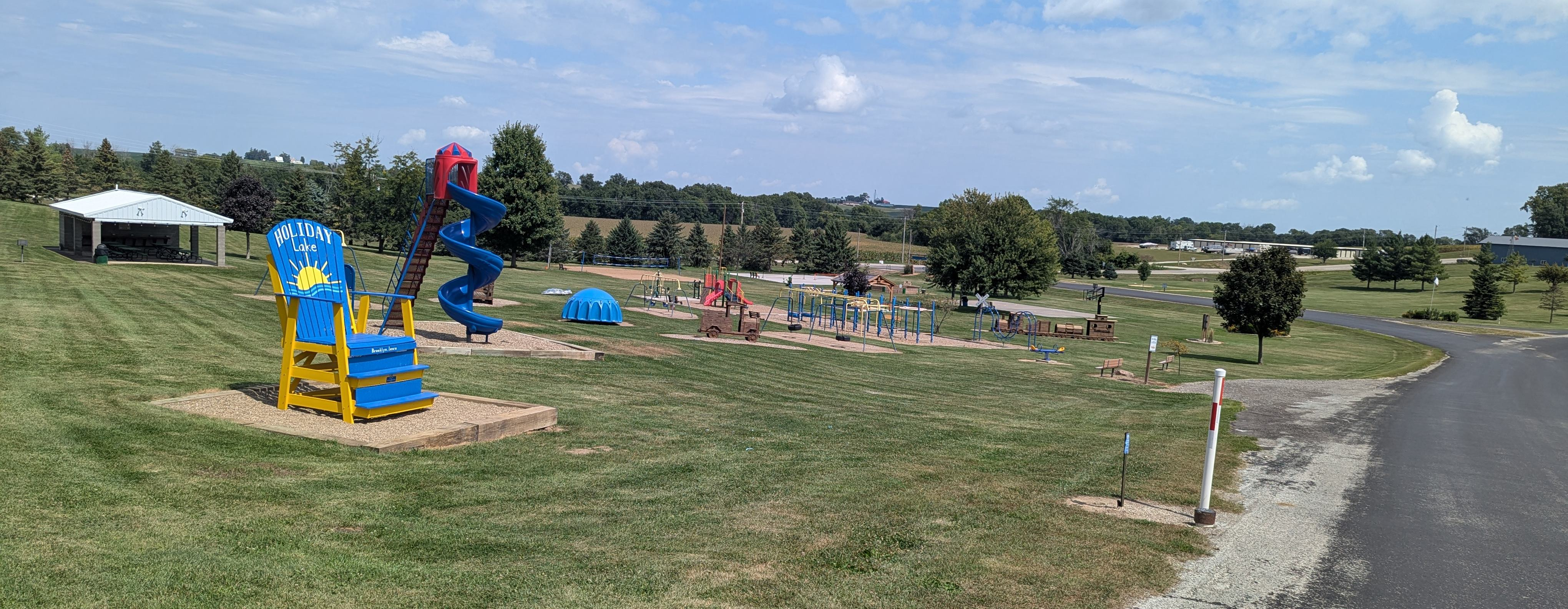
Powell Playground at Holiday Lake

== Demographics ==
Historical population
Census	Pop.	Note	%±
2010	433		—
2020	473		9.2%
U.S. Decennial Census

=== 2020 census ===
As of the census of 2020, there were 473 people, 233 households, and 150 families residing in the community. The population density was 176.8 inhabitants per square mile (68.3/km^{2}). There were 563 housing units at an average density of 210.4 per square mile (81.2/km^{2}). The racial makeup of the community was 95.6% White, 0.2% Black or African American, 0.8% Native American, 0.0% Asian, 0.0% Pacific Islander, 0.4% from other races and 3.0% from two or more races. Hispanic or Latino persons of any race comprised 1.5% of the population.

Of the 233 households, 15.9% of which had children under the age of 18 living with them, 54.9% were married couples living together, 6.0% were cohabitating couples, 18.5% had a female householder with no spouse or partner present and 20.6% had a male householder with no spouse or partner present. 35.6% of all households were non-families. 29.6% of all households were made up of individuals, 11.2% had someone living alone who was 65 years old or older.

The median age in the community was 55.9 years. 15.6% of the residents were under the age of 20; 2.5% were between the ages of 20 and 24; 19.0% were from 25 and 44; 34.5% were from 45 and 64; and 28.3% were 65 years of age or older. The gender makeup of the community was 50.3% male and 49.7% female.
