= Edelen =

Edelen is a surname. Notable people with the surname include:

- Buddy Edelen (1937–1997), American marathoner
- Ed Edelen (1912–1982), American baseball player
- Joe Edelen (born 1955), American baseball player
- Mary B. Edelen (born 1944), American politician for South Dakota
- Rollin Edelen (1908–1993), American businessman and politician
- Walter E. Edelen (1911–1991), American politician and businessman
