= Carnforth (disambiguation) =

Carnforth is a small town in Lancashire, England.

Carnforth may also refer to:

- Carnforth, Iowa, a community in the United States
- Carnforth railway station, a railway station that serves the town of Carnforth, England
- Carnforth Cricket Club, a cricket club based at Lodge Quarry, Carnforth, England
- Carnforth High School, a high school in Carnforth, England
