= Lester Menke =

American politician (1918–2016)

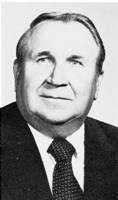

Member of the Iowa House of Representatives from the 7th district 5th (1973 – 1983)
- In office January 8, 1973 – January 13, 1985
- Preceded by: Rollin Edelen
- Succeeded by: Thomas Miller

Personal details
- Born: December 16, 1918 O'Brien County, Iowa
- Died: March 5, 2016 (aged 97) Des Moines, Iowa
- Party: Republican
- Children: 5
- Education: Morningside College; University of Iowa
- Profession: Farmer/Insurance Agent
- Website: Menke's website

Lester D. Menke (December 16, 1918 – March 5, 2016) was a state Representative from the Iowa's 5th and 7th Districts. He served in the Iowa House of Representatives from 1973 to 1985, serving as Speaker pro Tempore from 1981 to 1985. After he served in the Iowa House, Menke served as a liaison between Governor Terry Branstad and the legislature for two years. Menke has a B.A. from Morningside College, where he later served as a member of the board of directors, and attended The University of Iowa College of Law for one year. He worked as a farm owner and for an insurance agency. He served on various school boards and served as president of the Iowa Association of School Boards and State Board of Public Instruction and as director of the National Association of State Boards of Education, as well as serving on the Iowa Educational Radio and Television Facilities Board. Menke received Morningside College's Distinguished Alumni award in 1975.

Political offices
Preceded by ??	Speaker pro Tempore of the Iowa House of Representatives; 1981 – 1985	Succeeded by ??
Iowa House of Representatives
Preceded by Rollin Edelen	5th District; 1973 – 1983	Succeeded by Donald Paulin
Preceded by Sue Mullins	7th District; 1983 – 1985	Succeeded by Thomas Miller
