= KLOX =

- Creston, Iowa; United States
- Frequency: 90.9 MHz

Programming
- Format: Christian radio

Ownership
- Owner: St. Gabriel Communications

History
- First air date: 2005

Technical information
- Licensing authority: FCC
- Facility ID: 91587
- Class: A
- ERP: 500 watts
- HAAT: 102 meters (335 ft)
- Transmitter coordinates: 41°04′38″N 94°19′09″W

Links
- Public license information: Public file; LMS
- Website: kskb.net

KLOX is a Christian radio station licensed to Creston, Iowa, broadcasting on 90.9 MHz. KLOX had a construction permit to upgrade its license to C2 class and increase its effective radiated power to 45,000 watts, which would have given it coverage in the Des Moines metropolitan area. The station is owned by St. Gabriel Communications. and rebroadcasts KSKB 99.1 in Brooklyn, Iowa.
