= Washington Township, Poweshiek County, Iowa =

Township in Iowa, USA

Coordinates: 41°39′N 92°42′W

Washington Township is a township in Poweshiek County, Iowa, USA.
