= Malcom Township, Poweshiek County, Iowa =

Township in Iowa, USA

Coordinates: 41°44′N 92°35′W

Malcom Township is a township in Poweshiek County, Iowa, USA.
