= Chester Township, Poweshiek County, Iowa =

Township in Iowa, USA

Coordinates: 41°49′N 92°42′W

Chester Township is a township in Poweshiek County, Iowa, United States.
