= Tilton, Iowa =

- Unincorporated community
- Location within Iowa Location within the United States
- Coordinates: 41°30′35″N 92°21′09″W
- Country: United States
- State: Iowa
- Counties: Poweshiek, Keokuk
- Townships: Deep River; Prairie
- Elevation: 843 ft (257 m)
- Time zone: UTC-6 (Central (CST))
  - Summer (DST): UTC-5 (CDT)
- Area code: 641
- GNIS feature ID: 462243

Tilton is an unincorporated community in Poweshiek and Keokuk counties, in the U.S. state of Iowa.

== History ==
Tilton was platted in 1884. It was named for George W. Tilton, a railroad official. Tilton's population was 27 in 1902. The population was 42 in 1940.

The post office in Tilton closed in 1931.
