= Grant Township, Poweshiek County, Iowa =

Township in Iowa, USA

Coordinates: 41°44′N 92°42′W

Grant Township is a township in Poweshiek County, Iowa, USA.
