= Poweshiek County Courthouse =

Historic courthouse in Montezuma, Iowa, US

- U.S. National Register of Historic Places
- U.S. Historic district – Contributing property
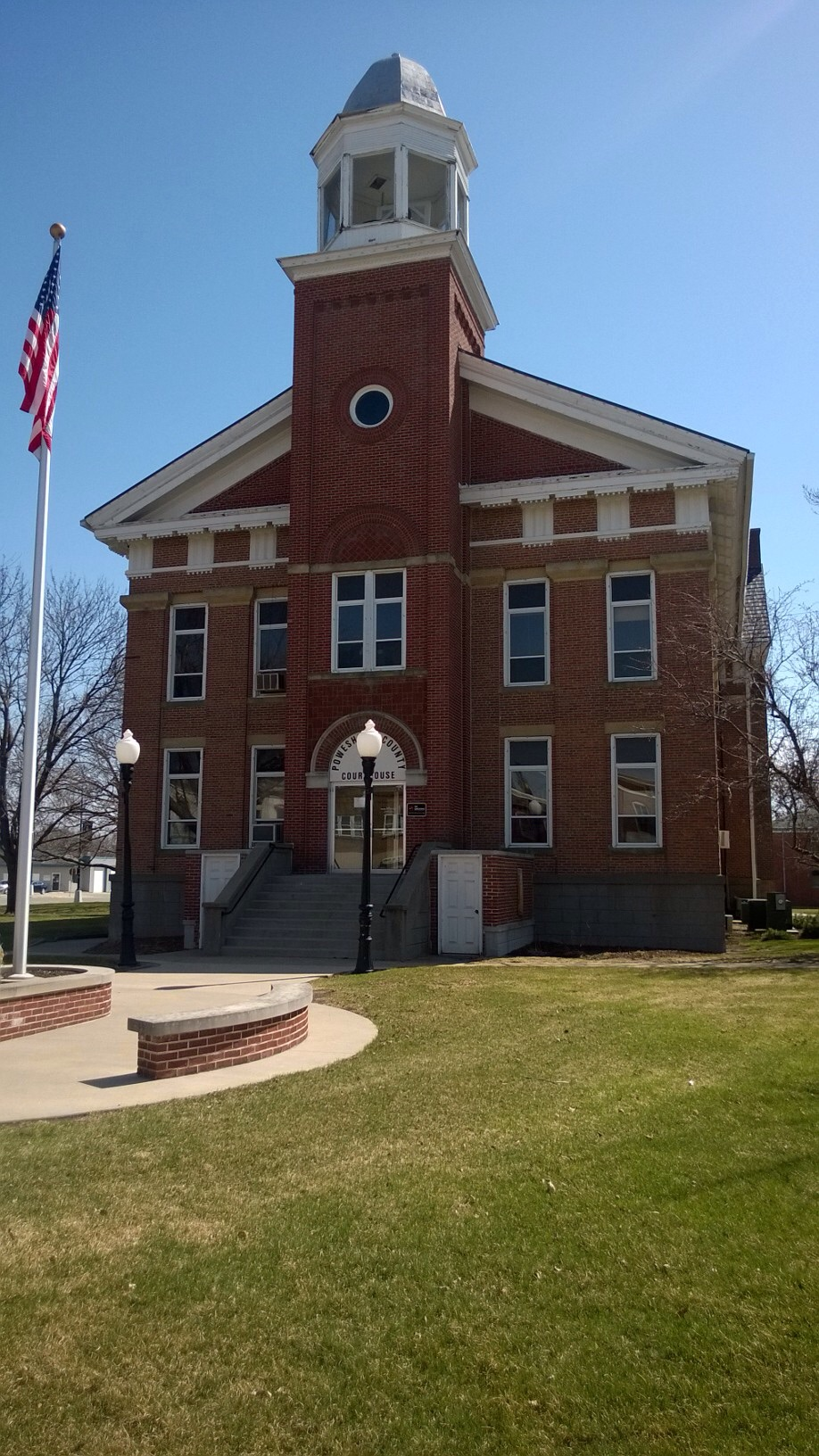
- Front of the courthouse

- Location within Iowa Location within the United States
- Interactive map showing the location for Poweshiek County Courthouse
- Location: 302 E. Main St. Montezuma, Iowa
- Coordinates: 41°35′05.3″N 92°31′27.4″W
- Area: less than one acre
- Built: 1859
- Architect: Drake & Dryden
- Architectural style: Greek Revival
- Part of: Montezuma Downtown Historic District (ID12000131)
- MPS: County Courthouses in Iowa TR
- NRHP reference No.: 81000266
- Added to NRHP: July 2, 1981

The Poweshiek County Courthouse in Montezuma, Iowa, United States, was built in 1859. It was individually listed on the National Register of Historic Places in 1981 as a part of the County Courthouses in Iowa Thematic Resource. In 2012 it was listed as a contributing property in the Montezuma Downtown Historic District. The courthouse is the second building the county has used for court functions and county administration.

== History ==
Poweshiek County's first courthouse was a two-story frame building constructed on the northeast corner of the town square in 1850. It served the community as a school, church, and meeting place as well as a courthouse. The courtroom was on the first floor and the county offices were located on the second floor. In time the building was remodeled as a house.

The present building was built for $1,928.15 in 1856. Drake & Dryden designed and built the Greek Revival structure, which is one of the oldest courthouses and one of few that are left in this architectural style in Iowa. An addition was made to the building in 1890 and major repair work was completed in 1933. Another addition on the south side of the building was completed in 1982.

== Architecture ==
The courthouse is a two-story structure composed of dark red brick. A large square brick tower on the main facade rises to a white octagonal bell tower with a white dome. The arched main entrance is located at the base of the tower. The building also features pedimented gable ends, a wide triglyph frieze, and pilasters whose caps crowd the tops of the second-story windows. The raised basement is composed of coarse stone. The significance of the courthouse is derived from its association with county government, and the political power and prestige of Montezuma as the county seat.

== See also ==
- National Register of Historic Places in Poweshiek County, Iowa
