= English River (Iowa) =

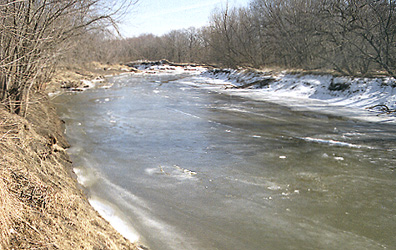
- The English River at Riverside

Location
- Country: United States
- State: Iowa
- District: Washington County, Iowa

Physical characteristics
- Source
  - coordinates: 41.5075°N 92.0540°W
- Mouth: Iowa River
  - coordinates: 41.4875°N 91.50183°W
- Discharge
  - location: Kalona, Iowa
  - average: 427 cu/ft. per sec.

The English River is a tributary of the Iowa River in southeastern Iowa in the United States. The main stem of the river is 37.4 miles (60.2 km) long. Including its longest headwaters tributary, the North English River, the total length increases to 89.2 miles (143.6 km). Via the Iowa River, it is part of the Mississippi River watershed. The Deep River is a minor tributary of the English River. The towns of North English, South English and Deep River are named for the English and Deep rivers.

== Course ==
The English River flows for much of its course in north and south forks, which join in extreme northwestern Washington County. The English River then flows generally eastwardly for about 37 miles (60 km), past the town of Riverside. It joins the Iowa River in northeastern Washington County, 12 miles (19 km) south of Iowa City.

=== North English River ===
The 51.8-mile-long (83.4 km) North English River is the longer of the two forks. It rises just south of Grinnell in western Poweshiek County and flows generally east-southeastwardly through Iowa County, past the town of Guernsey. In Iowa County it collects two minor tributaries, the Deep River and the Middle English River, both of which rise in Poweshiek County and flow eastwardly for short distances.

==== Deep River ====
The Deep River is a minor tributary of the North English River. It rises about two miles north-northwest of Montezuma in the south-central part of Poweshiek County at 41°37′32″N 092°33′05″W with an elevation of 950 feet (290 m). It flows generally eastward for about 15 miles (24 km), passing on the north side of the village of Deep River, Iowa, until it reaches the North English River at 41°35′47″N 092°15′14″W at an elevation of 758 feet (231 m) in the south-west part of Iowa County. The stream was reportedly named not because the water was so deep, but rather it was so far down from the stream bank to the water.

The river experienced a record flood on May 14, 1970, with a greater than 50 year recurrence interval. At the flood crest the stream gage on the Deep River station at the town of Deep River measured a record stage of 83.85 feet (25.56 m) and a stream flow of 6,200 cubic feet per second (180 m^{3}/s)

==== Middle English River ====
The Middle English River, also the Middle Fork English River, is a minor tributary of the North English River. It rises about two miles (3.2 km) south-southeast of the village of Deep River, Iowa in the southeastern part of Poweshiek County at 41°33′15″N 092°21′21″W with an elevation of 920 feet (280 m). It flows generally eastward for about 17 miles (27 km) until it reaches the North English River at 41°32′33″N 092°01′59″W about 2 miles (3.2 km) northeast of North English at an elevation of 699 feet (213 m) near the southern border of Iowa County.

=== South English River ===
The 48.5-mile-long (78.1 km) South English River rises just south of Montezuma in southern Poweshiek County and flows generally eastwardly through extreme northeastern Mahaska County and northern Keokuk County.

== See also ==
- List of Iowa rivers
