= Jefferson Township, Poweshiek County, Iowa =

Township in Iowa, USA

Coordinates: 41°49′N 92°21′W

West Holman Township is a township in Poweshiek County, Iowa, USA.
