= Poweshiek County, Iowa =

County in Iowa, United States

- County
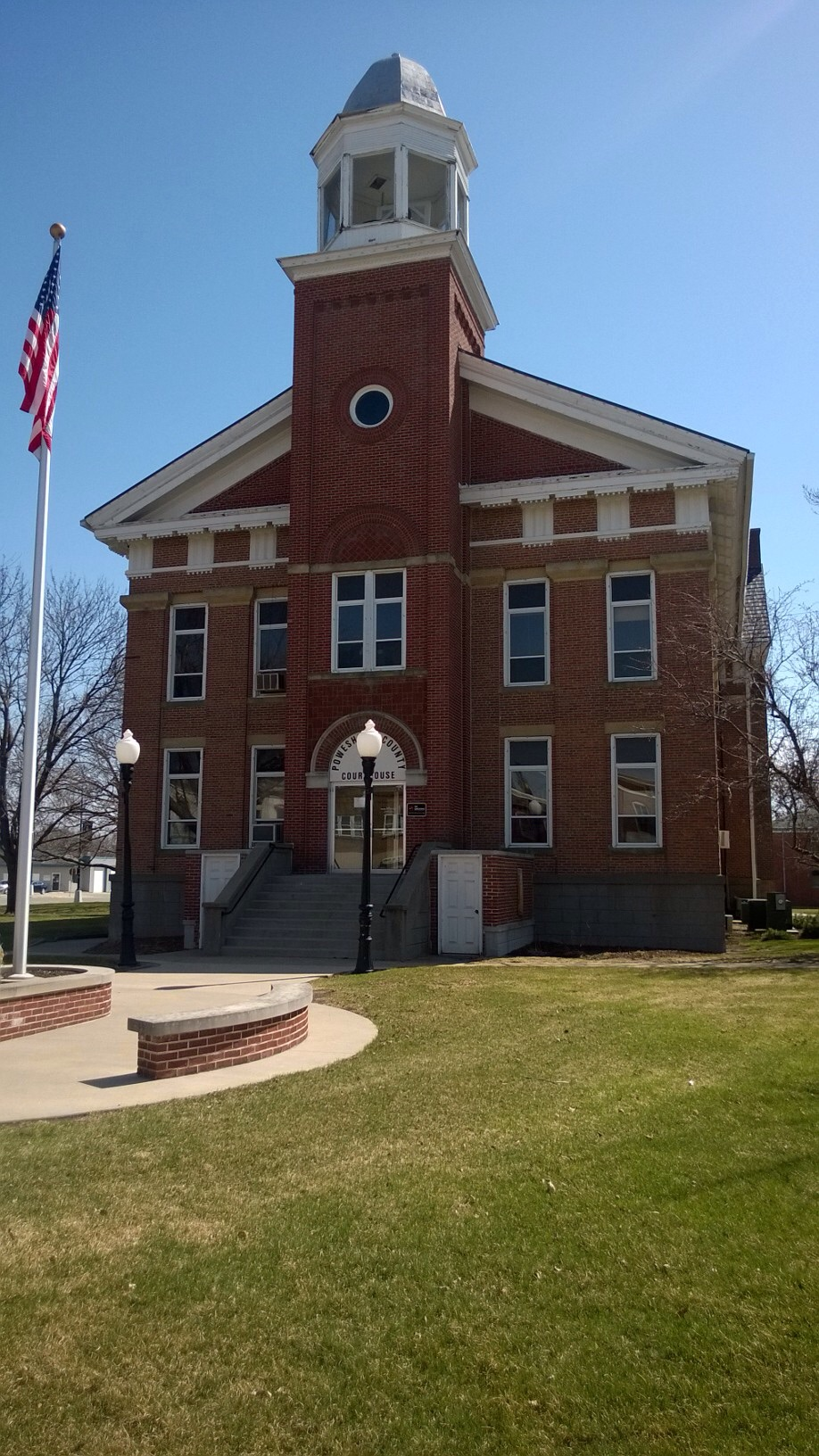
- The Poweshiek County Courthouse in Montezuma

- Location within the U.S. state of Iowa
- Coordinates: 41°41′03″N 92°31′48″W
- Country: United States
- State: Iowa
- Founded: 1843
- Named for: Poweshiek, Meskwaki chief
- Seat: Montezuma
- Largest city: Grinnell

Area
  - Total: 586 sq mi (1,520 km^{2})
  - Land: 585 sq mi (1,520 km^{2})
  - Water: 1.1 sq mi (2.8 km^{2}) 0.2%

Population (2020)
  - Total: 18,662
  - Estimate (2025): 18,368 ▼
  - Density: 31.9/sq mi (12.3/km^{2})
- Time zone: UTC−6 (Central)
  - Summer (DST): UTC−5 (CDT)
- Congressional district: 2nd
- Website: poweshiekcountyiowa.gov
- Iowa county number 79

Poweshiek County is a county in the southeastern part of the U.S. state of Iowa. As of the 2020 United States census, the population was 18,662. The county seat is Montezuma. The county is named for the chief of the Meskwaki who signed the treaty ending the Black Hawk War. It lies along Interstate 80 between Des Moines and Iowa City. Poweshiek County's largest city is Grinnell.

== History ==
Poweshiek County was formed in 1843. It was named for Meskwaki Chief Poweshiek (1791–1854), a chief of the Meskwaki people. The Poweshiek County Courthouse, completed in 1859, is listed on the National Register of Historic Places.

== Government and infrastructure ==
County business is overseen by three elected county supervisors. The county website provides names and contact information for the current supervisors.

United States presidential election results for Poweshiek County, Iowa
Year	Republican		Democratic		Third party(ies)	
Year	No.	%	No.	%	No.	%
1896	2,969	58.49%	2,013	39.66%	94	1.85%
1900	3,199	63.05%	1,765	34.79%	110	2.17%
1904	3,137	67.48%	1,212	26.07%	300	6.45%
1908	2,794	59.73%	1,661	35.51%	223	4.77%
1912	902	19.85%	1,631	35.89%	2,012	44.27%
1916	2,748	57.39%	1,880	39.26%	160	3.34%
1920	5,806	71.41%	2,125	26.14%	199	2.45%
1924	4,414	53.57%	1,428	17.33%	2,397	29.09%
1928	5,212	63.95%	2,787	34.20%	151	1.85%
1932	3,490	41.77%	4,649	55.64%	216	2.59%
1936	4,037	44.88%	4,745	52.75%	214	2.38%
1940	4,773	49.66%	4,794	49.88%	44	0.46%
1944	4,186	49.47%	4,234	50.04%	41	0.48%
1948	3,888	46.37%	4,324	51.57%	173	2.06%
1952	6,105	64.28%	3,318	34.93%	75	0.79%
1956	5,145	58.81%	3,602	41.17%	2	0.02%
1960	5,232	58.76%	3,671	41.23%	1	0.01%
1964	3,109	37.31%	5,213	62.55%	12	0.14%
1968	4,470	55.10%	3,250	40.06%	392	4.83%
1972	4,785	55.33%	3,718	42.99%	145	1.68%
1976	4,194	48.01%	4,360	49.91%	181	2.07%
1980	4,598	50.52%	3,529	38.77%	975	10.71%
1984	4,715	53.04%	4,103	46.16%	71	0.80%
1988	3,683	42.70%	4,876	56.53%	66	0.77%
1992	3,245	35.87%	4,056	44.83%	1,746	19.30%
1996	3,221	39.21%	4,183	50.93%	810	9.86%
2000	4,396	48.95%	4,222	47.02%	362	4.03%
2004	4,965	49.20%	5,043	49.98%	83	0.82%
2008	4,340	43.26%	5,519	55.01%	174	1.73%
2012	4,424	44.35%	5,357	53.70%	194	1.94%
2016	4,946	50.30%	4,304	43.77%	583	5.93%
2020	5,657	55.79%	4,306	42.47%	177	1.75%
2024	5,758	57.51%	4,067	40.62%	188	1.88%

== Elected officials ==
- County supervisors: Chairman Jeff Tindle (R), Vice-chair Jason Roudabush (D), Jacki Bolen (R)
- County attorney: Bart Klaver (R)
- County auditor: Missy Eilander (R)
- County recorder: Lora Wyckoff (R)
- County sheriff: Matt Maschmann (R)
- County treasurer: Sandy Ross (R)

=== Healthcare ===
Poweshiek County is served by Grinnell Regional Medical Center, an acute care hospital licensed for 81 beds. GRMC was established in 1967 after the merger of two hospitals.

== Geography ==
According to the United States Census Bureau, the county has a total area of 586 square miles (1,520 km^{2}), of which 585 square miles (1,520 km^{2}) is land and 1.1 square miles (2.8 km^{2}) (0.2%) is water. It is drained by the north fork of Skunk River, which crosses the southwest corner, and by English River and other streams.

=== Major highways ===
- Interstate 80
- U.S. Highway 6
- U.S. Highway 63
- Iowa Highway 21
- Iowa Highway 85
- Iowa Highway 146

=== Adjacent counties ===
- Tama County (north)
- Iowa County (east)
- Keokuk County (southeast)
- Mahaska County (south)
- Jasper County (west)

== Demographics ==
Historical population
Census	Pop.	Note	%±
1850	615		—
1860	5,668		821.6%
1870	15,581		174.9%
1880	18,936		21.5%
1890	18,394		−2.9%
1900	19,414		5.5%
1910	19,589		0.9%
1920	19,910		1.6%
1930	18,727		−5.9%
1940	18,758		0.2%
1950	19,344		3.1%
1960	19,300		−0.2%
1970	18,803		−2.6%
1980	19,306		2.7%
1990	19,033		−1.4%
2000	18,815		−1.1%
2010	18,914		0.5%
2020	18,662		−1.3%
2025 (est.)	18,368	▼	−1.6%
U.S. Decennial Census; 1790–1960 1900–1990; 1990–2000 2010–2020

=== 2020 census ===
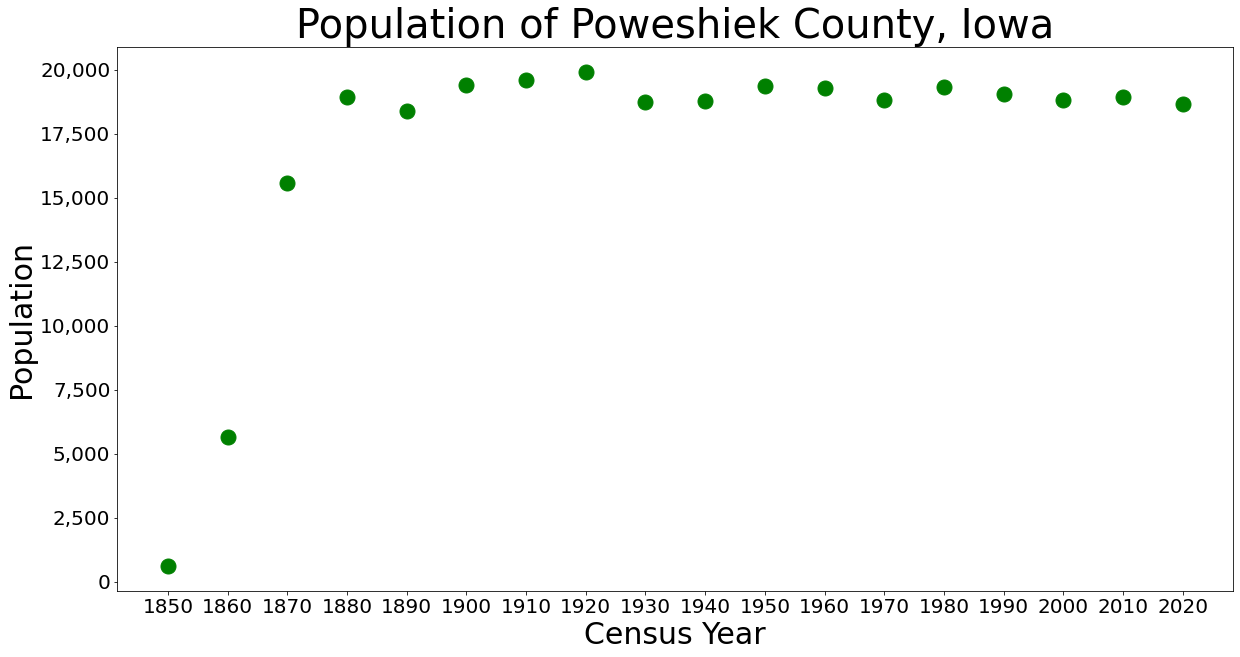
Population of Poweshiek County from the U.S. census data

As of the 2020 census, the county had a population of 18,662. The median age was 40.7 years, 19.4% of residents were under the age of 18, and 21.6% of residents were 65 years of age or older. For every 100 females there were 94.7 males, and for every 100 females age 18 and over there were 93.0 males age 18 and over.

The racial makeup of the county was 92.2% White, 1.8% Black or African American, 0.3% American Indian and Alaska Native, 1.2% Asian, 0.1% Native Hawaiian and Pacific Islander, 0.9% from some other race, and 3.5% from two or more races. Hispanic or Latino residents of any race comprised 2.8% of the population. Overall, 96.55% of the county's population reported being of one race.

50.8% of residents lived in urban areas, while 49.2% lived in rural areas.

There were 7,536 households in the county, of which 25.4% had children under the age of 18 living in them. Of all households, 48.9% were married-couple households, 18.4% were households with a male householder and no spouse or partner present, and 26.1% were households with a female householder and no spouse or partner present. About 32.3% of all households were made up of individuals and 15.1% had someone living alone who was 65 years of age or older.

There were 8,906 housing units, of which 15.4% were vacant. Among occupied housing units, 71.7% were owner-occupied and 28.3% were renter-occupied. The homeowner vacancy rate was 1.6% and the rental vacancy rate was 9.3%.

Poweshiek County Racial Composition
Race	Number	Percent
White (NH)	17,004	91.11%
Black or African American (NH)	320	1.7%
Native American (NH)	53	0.3%
Asian (NH)	221	1.2%
Pacific Islander (NH)	21	0.11%
Other/Mixed (NH)	514	2.8%
Hispanic or Latino	529	2.83%

=== 2010 census ===
The 2010 census recorded a population of 18,914 in the county, with a population density of 32.3/sq mi (12.5/km^{2}). There were 8,949 housing units, of which 7,555 were occupied.

=== 2000 census ===
As of the census of 2000, there were 18,815 people, 7,398 households, and 4,882 families in the county. The population density was 32 people per square mile (12 people/km^{2}). There were 8,556 housing units at an average density of 15 per square mile (5.8/km^{2}). The racial makeup of the county was 96.74% White, 0.55% Black or African American, 0.23% Native American, 1.07% Asian, 0.05% Pacific Islander, 0.49% from other races, and 0.87% from two or more races. 1.20% of the population were Hispanic or Latino of any race.

Of the 7,398 households 29.0% had children under the age of 18 living with them, 55.8% were married couples living together, 7.4% had a female householder with no husband present, and 34.0% were non-families. 29.2% of households were one person and 13.9% were one person aged 65 or older. The average household size was 2.35 and the average family size was 2.88.

The age distribution was 22.7% under the age of 18, 12.8% from 18 to 24, 24.4% from 25 to 44, 22.5% from 45 to 64, and 17.6% 65 or older. The median age was 38 years. For every 100 females there were 92.5 males. For every 100 females age 18 and over, there were 88.8 males.

The median household income was $37,836 and the median family income was $46,599. Males had a median income of $32,781 versus $22,465 for females. The per capita income for the county was $18,629. About 6.2% of families and 9.8% of the population were below the poverty line, including 12.0% of those under age 18 and 5.9% of those age 65 or over.

== Education ==
Poweshiek County is served by three community school districts:

District	Location	Num of campuses (inc. parochial)	Num of students	Student– teacher ratio	High school	District web site
BGM Community School District (Brooklyn–Guernsey–Malcom)	Brooklyn	1	532	-	BGM	BGM
Grinnell–Newburg Community School District	Grinnell	6	1,475	-	Grinnell	Grinnell
Montezuma Community School District	Montezuma	1	537	-	Montezuma	Montezuma

Poweshiek County is home to Grinnell College, a small liberal arts college founded in 1846.

There is one private school in the county, Central Iowa Christian School, in Grinnell.

== Communities ==
=== Cities ===
- Barnes City
- Brooklyn
- Deep River
- Grinnell
- Guernsey
- Hartwick
- Malcom
- Montezuma
- Searsboro
- Victor

=== Unincorporated communities ===
- Carnforth
- Ewart
- Jacobs
- Tilton

== Population ==
=== Townships ===
- Bear Creek
- Chester
- Deep River
- Grant
- Jackson
- Jefferson
- Lincoln
- Madison
- Malcom
- Pleasant
- Scott
- Sheridan
- Sugar Creek
- Union
- Warren
- Washington

=== Census-designated places ===
- Holiday Lake

=== Population ranking ===
The population ranking of the following table is based on the 2020 United States census.

† county seat

Rank	City/town/etc.	Municipal type	Population (2020 Census)
1	Grinnell	City	9,564
2	Brooklyn	City	1,502
3	† Montezuma	City	1,442
4	Victor (mostly in Iowa County)	City	875
5	Holiday Lake	CDP	473
6	Malcom	City	270
7	Deep River	City	249
8	Barnes City (partially in Mahaska County)	City	156
9	Searsboro	City	129
10	Hartwick	City	92
11	Guernsey	City	63

== See also ==
- Poweshiek County Courthouse
- National Register of Historic Places listings in Poweshiek County, Iowa
