= Ramsey Creek (Iowa) =

Stream in Iowa, U.S.

Coordinates: 41°28′36″N 91°44′08″W

Ramsey Creek is a stream in the U.S. state of Iowa. It is a tributary to the English River.

It is unknown why the name "Ramsey Creek" was applied to this stream.
