= Malcom, Iowa =

- City
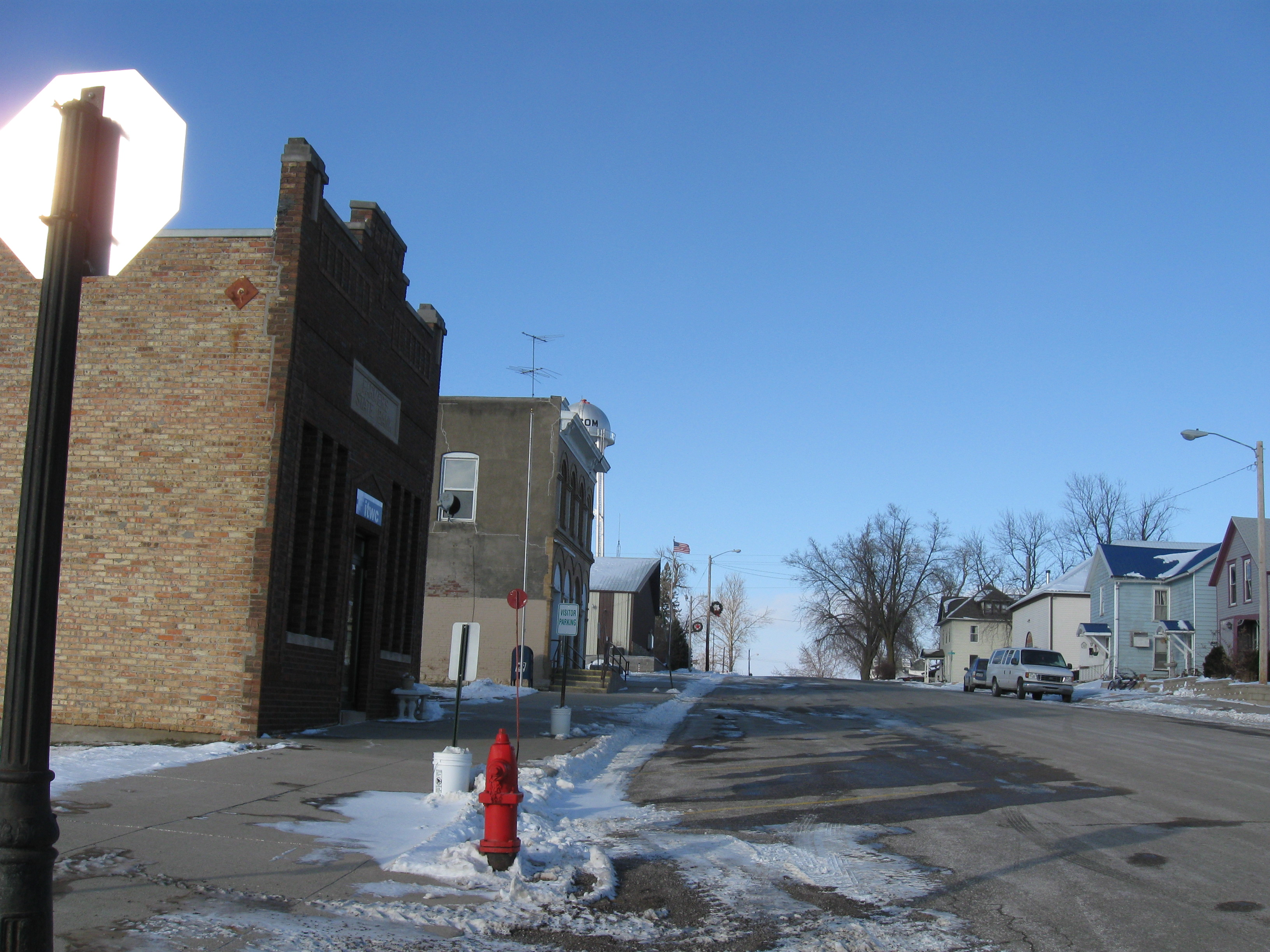
- Main Street in Malcom in December 2008

- Location of Malcom, Iowa
- Coordinates: 41°42′27″N 92°33′19″W
- Country: United States
- State: Iowa
- County: Poweshiek

Government
  - Mayor: Dawn Hamilton

Area
  - Total: 0.83 sq mi (2.14 km^{2})
  - Land: 0.83 sq mi (2.14 km^{2})
  - Water: 0 sq mi (0.00 km^{2})
- Elevation: 915 ft (279 m)

Population (2020)
  - Total: 270
  - Density: 326.7/sq mi (126.14/km^{2})
- Time zone: UTC-6 (Central (CST))
  - Summer (DST): UTC-5 (CDT)
- ZIP code: 50157
- Area code: 641
- FIPS code: 19-48540
- GNIS feature ID: 0458739
- Website: https://www.cityofmalcomiowa.com/

Malcom is a city in Poweshiek County, Iowa, United States. The population was 270 at the time of the 2020 census. The city was named for an early Scotch settler. The town's major businesses include BASF.

== History ==
Prior to the treaty of May 1, 1843, the area of what is now Malcom was Sauk and Meskwaki lands. Though there were a few settlers earlier, by 1858, the population justified the formation of a township. The railroad was extended from Iowa City in 1863, and the village was laid out on the Little Bear Creek. The town was incorporated on April 23, 1872. The town was badly damaged in the 2020 derecho, when a resident died and several grain silos were toppled.

== Education ==
The first school in Malcom was established in 1855, consisting of six students. In 1864, the Malcom Independent School was established. By 1880, there were 136 pupils in the school. The first high school was started in 1885, though only three years were offered, and many students went to Grinnell to complete their work. The first graduating class of seven students, all girls, was in 1888. A modern two-story brick schoolhouse was dedicated in November 1903. In 1923–24, a new addition was built at a cost of $38,000. During this time, there were also nine rural one room schools in the township. The last class to graduate from Malcom High School was in 1960, as the school merged with schools in Brooklyn and Guernsey to form the BGM Community School District. The Malcom school was then converted to an elementary school.

== Geography ==
Malcom is located at 41°42′27″N 92°33′19″W (41.707486, -92.555373).

According to the United States Census Bureau, the city has a total area of 0.61 square miles (1.58 km^{2}), all land. The town is located just north of Interstate 80. Little Bear Creek runs through the southern edge of town.

== Demographics ==
Historical populations
Year	Pop.	±%
1880	416	—
1890	372	−10.6%
1900	404	+8.6%
1910	377	−6.7%
1920	413	+9.5%
1930	381	−7.7%
1940	447	+17.3%
1950	406	−9.2%
1960	416	+2.5%
1970	388	−6.7%
1980	418	+7.7%
1990	447	+6.9%
2000	352	−21.3%
2010	287	−18.5%
2020	270	−5.9%
Source:"U.S. Census website". United States Census Bureau. and Iowa Data Center; Source: U.S. Decennial Census

=== 2020 census ===
As of the census of 2020, there were 270 people, 117 households, and 80 families residing in the city. The population density was 326.7 inhabitants per square mile (126.1/km^{2}). There were 132 housing units at an average density of 159.7 per square mile (61.7/km^{2}). The racial makeup of the city was 95.6% White, 0.0% Black or African American, 0.0% Native American, 0.0% Asian, 0.0% Pacific Islander, 0.7% from other races and 3.7% from two or more races. Hispanic or Latino persons of any race comprised 1.9% of the population.

Of the 117 households, 32.5% of which had children under the age of 18 living with them, 48.7% were married couples living together, 8.5% were cohabitating couples, 24.8% had a female householder with no spouse or partner present and 17.9% had a male householder with no spouse or partner present. 31.6% of all households were non-families. 26.5% of all households were made up of individuals, 12.0% had someone living alone who was 65 years old or older.

The median age in the city was 45.5 years. 21.5% of the residents were under the age of 20; 4.1% were between the ages of 20 and 24; 24.1% were from 25 and 44; 27.4% were from 45 and 64; and 23.0% were 65 years of age or older. The gender makeup of the city was 50.7% male and 49.3% female.

=== 2010 census ===
As of the census of 2010, there were 287 people, 132 households, and 86 families living in the city. The population density was 470.5 inhabitants per square mile (181.7/km^{2}). There were 143 housing units at an average density of 234.4 per square mile (90.5/km^{2}). The racial makeup of the city was 98.6% White, 0.3% African American, 0.3% Native American, and 0.7% from two or more races. Hispanic or Latino of any race were 1.0% of the population.

There were 132 households, of which 21.2% had children under the age of 18 living with them, 58.3% were married couples living together, 4.5% had a female householder with no husband present, 2.3% had a male householder with no wife present, and 34.8% were non-families. 29.5% of all households were made up of individuals, and 12.9% had someone living alone who was 65 years of age or older. The average household size was 2.17 and the average family size was 2.70.

The median age in the city was 47.9 years. 17.1% of residents were under the age of 18; 6.9% were between the ages of 18 and 24; 22.9% were from 25 to 44; 31.4% were from 45 to 64; and 21.6% were 65 years of age or older. The gender makeup of the city was 53.0% male and 47.0% female.

=== 2000 census ===
As of the census of 2000, there were 352 people, 144 households, and 102 families living in the city. The population density was 575.6 inhabitants per square mile (222.2/km^{2}). There were 154 housing units at an average density of 251.8 per square mile (97.2/km^{2}). The racial makeup of the city was 99.43% White, 0.28% from other races, and 0.28% from two or more races. Hispanic or Latino of any race were 0.28% of the population.

There were 144 households, out of which 28.5% had children under the age of 18 living with them, 64.6% were married couples living together, 5.6% had a female householder with no husband present, and 28.5% were non-families. 25.0% of all households were made up of individuals, and 10.4% had someone living alone who was 65 years of age or older. The average household size was 2.44 and the average family size was 2.92.

In the city, the population was spread out, with 21.9% under the age of 18, 8.0% from 18 to 24, 29.0% from 25 to 44, 26.1% from 45 to 64, and 15.1% who were 65 years of age or older. The median age was 40 years. For every 100 females, there were 101.1 males. For every 100 females age 18 and over, there were 93.7 males.

The median income for a household in the city was $39,167, and the median income for a family was $55,417. Males had a median income of $28,194 versus $19,286 for females. The per capita income for the city was $17,059. About 8.0% of families and 9.3% of the population were below the poverty line, including 10.6% of those under age 18 and 8.9% of those age 65 or over.
