= Brooklyn, Iowa =

- City
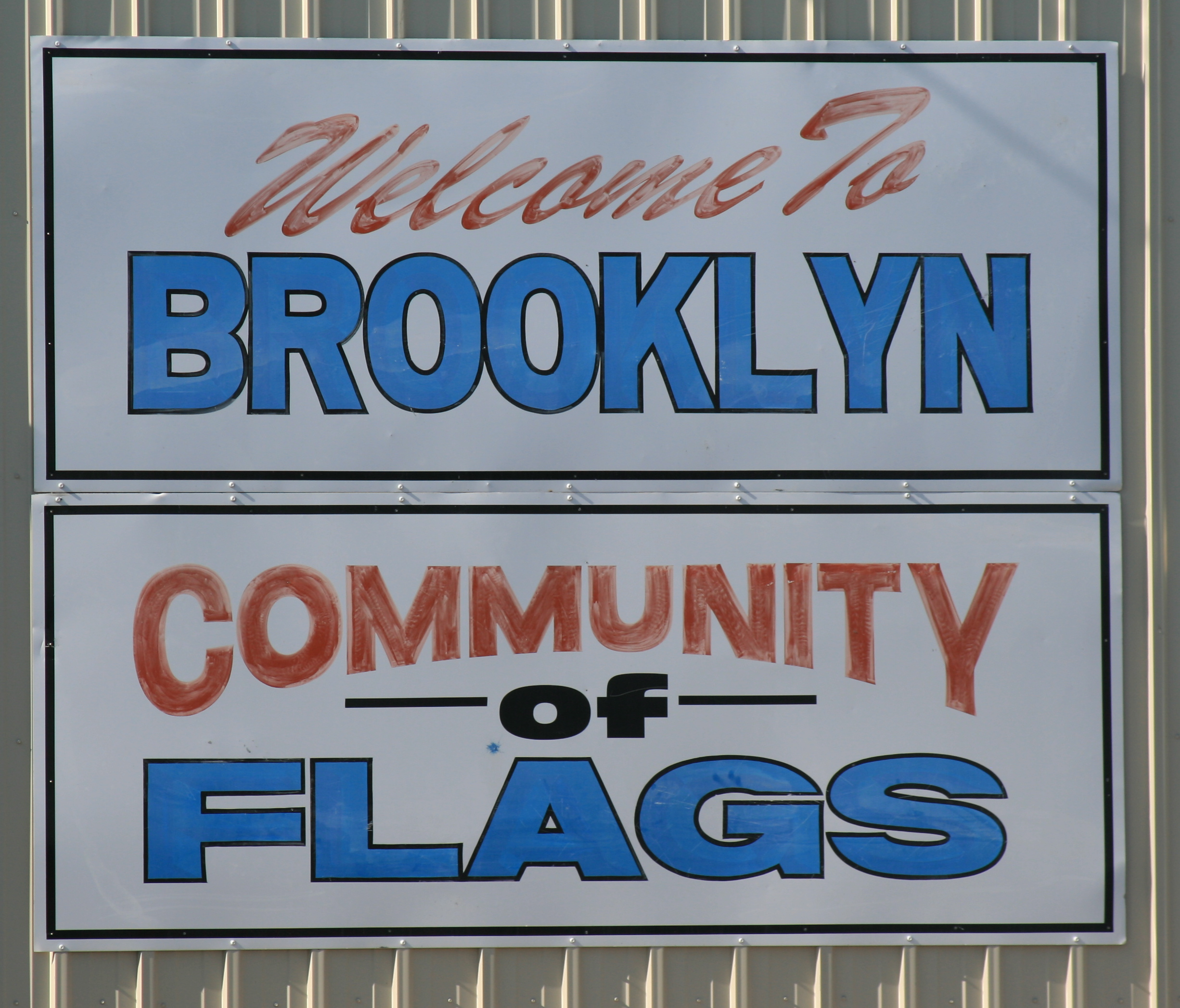
- Brooklyn's welcome sign
- Nickname: Brooklyn: Community of Flags
- Location of Brooklyn, Iowa
- Coordinates: 41°43′56″N 92°26′37″W
- Country: United States
- State: Iowa
- County: Poweshiek

Area
  - Total: 1.31 sq mi (3.40 km^{2})
  - Land: 1.31 sq mi (3.40 km^{2})
  - Water: 0 sq mi (0.00 km^{2})
- Elevation: 912 ft (278 m)

Population (2020)
  - Total: 1,502
  - Density: 1,142.5/sq mi (441.12/km^{2})
- Time zone: UTC-6 (Central (CST))
  - Summer (DST): UTC-5 (CDT)
- ZIP code: 52211
- Area code: 641
- FIPS code: 19-08695
- GNIS feature ID: 0454842
- Website: brooklyniowa.com

Brooklyn is a city in Poweshiek County, Iowa, United States. The population was 1,502 at the 2020 census. It is located just off U.S. Route 6 and a few miles north of Interstate 80. Near the center of town, Brooklyn boasts a large display of flags from each of the fifty states, branches of the military, and a smattering of other sources. The city bills itself as "Brooklyn: Community of Flags."

== Geography ==
Brooklyn is located at 41°43′56″N 92°26′37″W (41.732093, −92.443531).

According to the United States Census Bureau, the city has a total area of 1.24 square miles (3.21 km^{2}), all land.

== Demographics ==
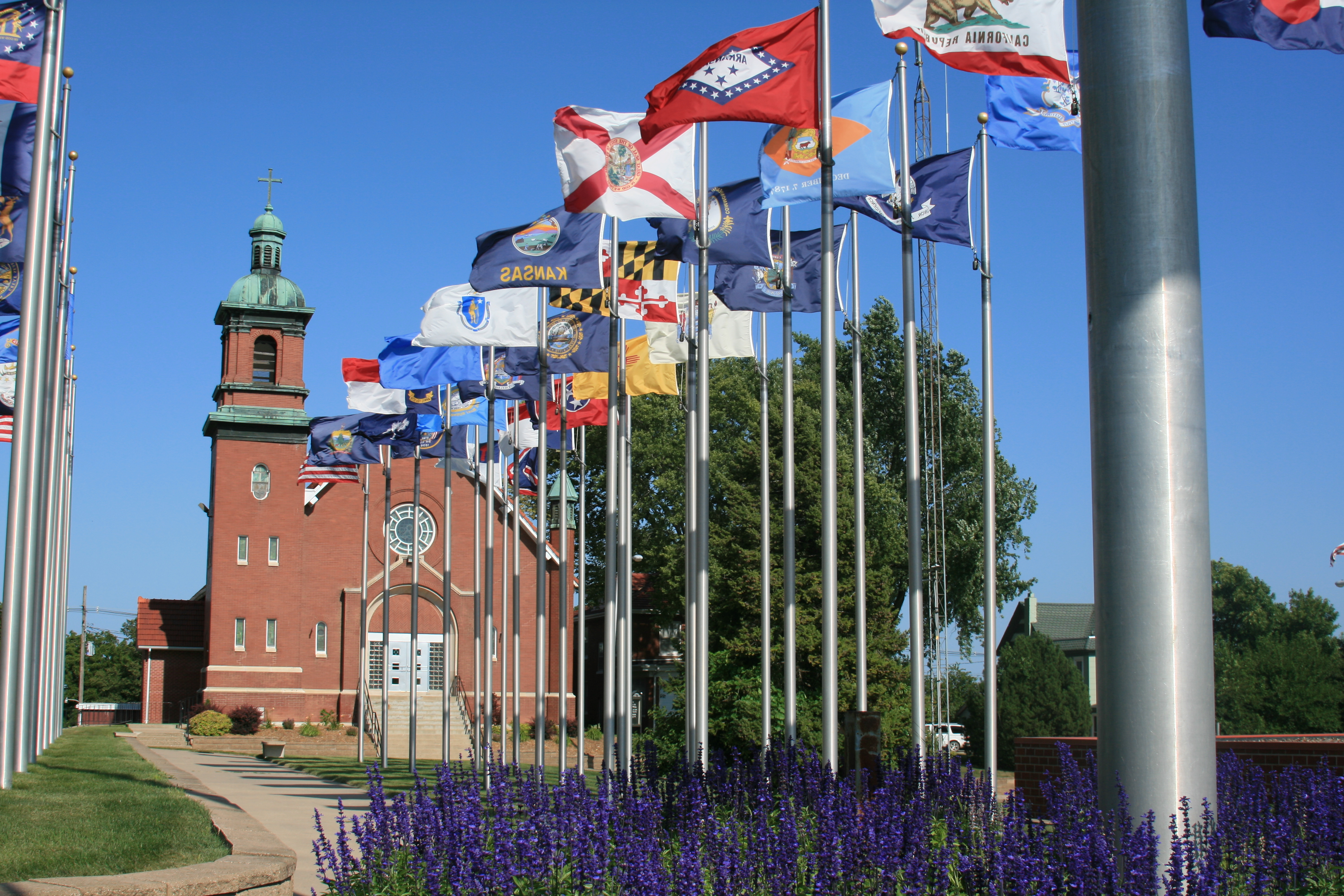
The state flag display in Brooklyn, Iowa.

Historical populations
| Year | Pop. | ±% |
|---|---|---|
| 1860 | 184 | — |
| 1870 | 971 | +427.7% |
| 1880 | 1,234 | +27.1% |
| 1890 | 1,202 | −2.6% |
| 1900 | 1,188 | −1.2% |
| 1910 | 1,233 | +3.8% |
| 1920 | 1,533 | +24.3% |
| 1930 | 1,345 | −12.3% |
| 1940 | 1,408 | +4.7% |
| 1950 | 1,323 | −6.0% |
| 1960 | 1,415 | +7.0% |
| 1970 | 1,410 | −0.4% |
| 1980 | 1,509 | +7.0% |
| 1990 | 1,439 | −4.6% |
| 2000 | 1,367 | −5.0% |
| 2010 | 1,468 | +7.4% |
| 2020 | 1,502 | +2.3% |
Source:"U.S. Census website". United States Census Bureau. and Iowa Data Center; Source: U.S. Decennial Census

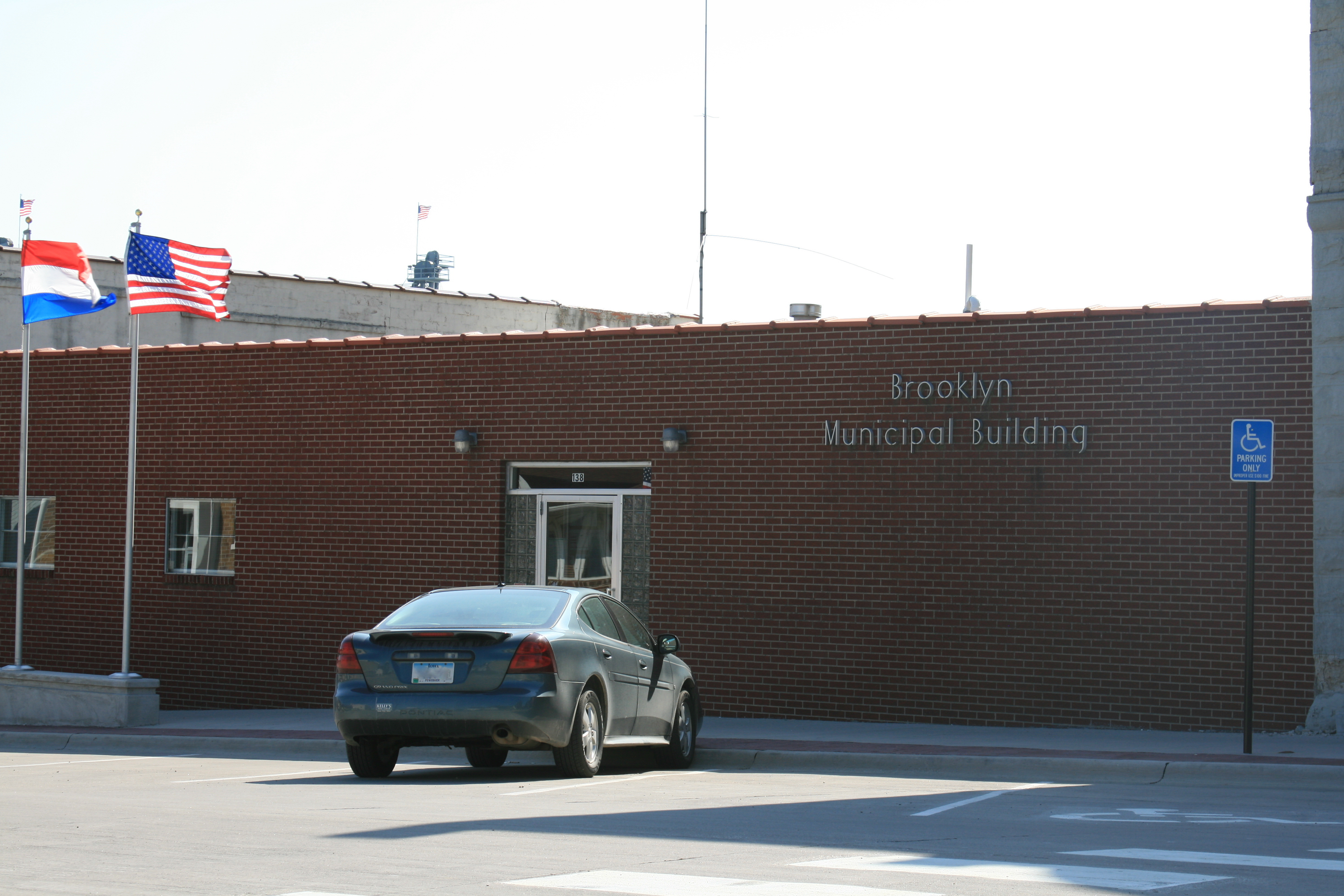
Brooklyn Municipal Building

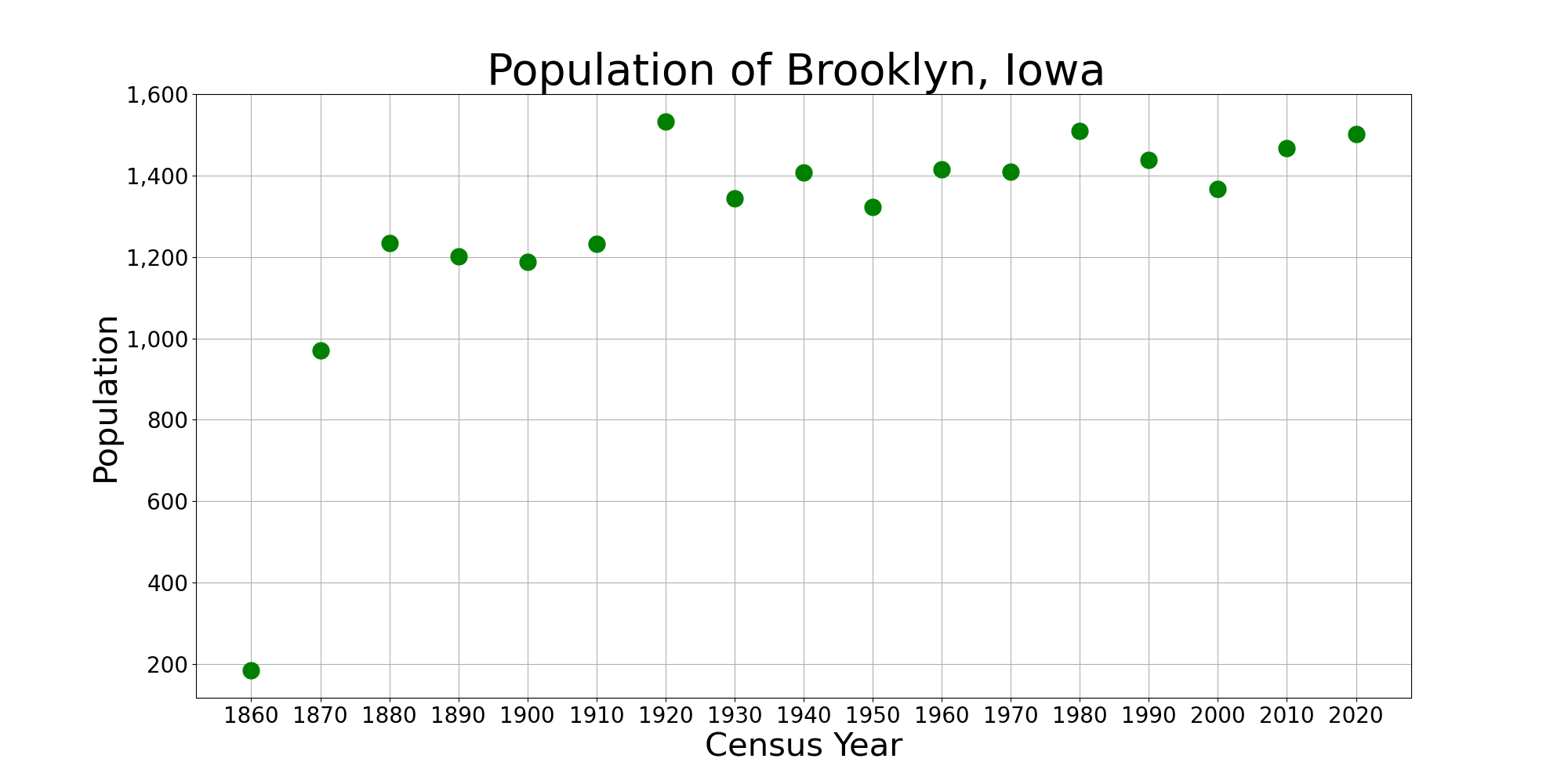
The population of Brooklyn, Iowa from US census data

=== 2020 census ===
As of the 2020 census, there were 1,502 people, 611 households, and 399 families residing in the city. The population density was 1,142.5 inhabitants per square mile (441.1/km^{2}). There were 652 housing units at an average density of 495.9 per square mile (191.5/km^{2}).

The median age in the city was 38.4 years. 25.3% of residents were under the age of 18. 28.0% of the residents were under the age of 20; 5.2% were between the ages of 20 and 24; 25.7% were from 25 and 44; 21.8% were from 45 and 64; and 19.3% were 65 years of age or older. For every 100 females there were 88.5 males, and for every 100 females age 18 and over there were 91.1 males age 18 and over.

Of the 611 households, 34.0% had children under the age of 18 living with them, 49.6% were married couples living together, 9.2% were cohabitating couples, 24.5% had a female householder with no spouse or partner present, and 16.7% had a male householder with no spouse or partner present. 34.7% of all households were non-families. 29.8% of all households were made up of individuals, and 13.9% had someone living alone who was 65 years old or older.

Of the 652 housing units, 6.3% were vacant. The homeowner vacancy rate was 1.3% and the rental vacancy rate was 8.9%. 0.0% of residents lived in urban areas, while 100.0% lived in rural areas.

Racial composition as of the 2020 census
| Race | Number | Percent |
|---|---|---|
| White | 1,445 | 96.2% |
| Black or African American | 2 | 0.1% |
| American Indian and Alaska Native | 5 | 0.3% |
| Asian | 5 | 0.3% |
| Native Hawaiian and Other Pacific Islander | 0 | 0.0% |
| Some other race | 12 | 0.8% |
| Two or more races | 33 | 2.2% |
| Hispanic or Latino (of any race) | 51 | 3.4% |

=== 2010 census ===
As of the census of 2010, there were 1,468 people, 615 households, and 370 families residing in the city. The population density was 1,183.9 inhabitants per square mile (457.1/km^{2}). There were 665 housing units at an average density of 536.3 per square mile (207.1/km^{2}). The racial makeup of the city was 95.1% White, 0.7% African American, 0.3% Asian, 2.9% from other races, and 1.0% from two or more races. Hispanic or Latino of any race were 4.0% of the population.

There were 615 households, of which 32.0% had children under the age of 18 living with them, 44.6% were married couples living together, 11.5% had a female householder with no husband present, 4.1% had a male householder with no wife present, and 39.8% were non-families. 33.5% of all households were made up of individuals, and 14.6% had someone living alone who was 65 years of age or older. The average household size was 2.31 and the average family size was 2.99.

The median age in the city was 36.2 years. 26.3% of residents were under the age of 18; 8.4% were between the ages of 18 and 24; 23.9% were from 25 to 44; 24.7% were from 45 to 64; and 16.6% were 65 years of age or older. The gender makeup of the city was 46.3% male and 53.7% female.

=== 2000 census ===
As of the census of 2000, there were 1,367 people, 582 households, and 349 families residing in the city. The population density was 1,142.8 inhabitants per square mile (441.2/km^{2}). There were 639 housing units at an average density of 534.2 per square mile (206.3/km^{2}). The racial makeup of the city was 99.20% White, 0.07% Asian, 0.22% from other races, and 0.51% from two or more races. Hispanic or Latino of any race were 0.51% of the population.

There were 582 households, out of which 29.6% had children under the age of 18 living with them, 48.1% were married couples living together, 8.9% had a female householder with no husband present, and 39.9% were non-families. 36.8% of all households were made up of individuals, and 20.3% had someone living alone who was 65 years of age or older. The average household size was 2.25 and the average family size was 2.95.

24.5% were under the age of 18, 7.5% from 18 to 24, 26.5% from 25 to 44, 20.3% from 45 to 64, and 21.2% were 65 years of age or older. The median age was 40 years. For every 100 females, there were 83.5 males. For every 100 females age 18 and over, there were 79.8 males.

The median income for a household in the city was $34,583, and the median income for a family was $44,531. Males had a median income of $29,018 versus $20,481 for females. The per capita income for the city was $18,315. About 2.9% of families and 6.2% of the population were below the poverty line, including 6.6% of those under age 18 and 7.5% of those age 65 or over.

== Education ==
Brooklyn is part of the BGM Community School District, a primarily rural school district that also includes the communities of Guernsey and Malcom and surrounding areas. The main campus houses a single building that serves students from pre-kindergarten through 12th grade.

== Healthcare ==
Brooklyn area residents have access to Brooklyn Medical Clinic, located at 128 Jackson St. When hospitalization is required the closest and most convenient hospital for residents is Grinnell Regional Medical Center, located at 210 4th Avenue in Grinnell, Iowa.

== Media ==
Brooklyn is home to one radio station. KSKB Radio broadcasts on 99.1 FM as a Class C2 station and broadcasts and contemporary Christian music and teaching format. The station is locally programmed but owned by Florida Public Radio, Inc. which owns other stations in Iowa, Kansas, & Florida as well. KSKB is marketed towards the Cedar Rapids - Iowa City - Marshalltown - Pella region and is rebroadcast on K259AV 99.7 in Waterloo and KLOX 90.9 in Creston.

Brooklyn is served by The Record, a weekly newspaper that started in Deep River, Iowa, in 1899. It was resurrected and relocated to Montezuma in 2010, after longtime newspaper the Montezuma Republican merged with the Brooklyn Chronicle in 2009, to form the Poweshiek County Chronicle-Republican or CR in Grinnell. The Record is an official newspaper for Poweshiek County, City of Montezuma, City of Deep River, City of Brooklyn, and Montezuma Community School District.

== Notable people ==
- Bruce Braley (born 1957), United States Congressman, grew up in Brooklyn.
- Rollin Edelen (1908–1993), Iowa businessman and state legislator, was born in Brooklyn.
- Walter E. Edelen (1911–1991), Iowa business and state legislator, was born in Brooklyn.
- Harold Keller (1921–1979), United States Marine corporal who assisted in raising the flag on Iwo Jima on February 23, 1945.
- Bernard F. Meyer (1891–1975), Catholic missionary to China who served as Prefect Apostolic of Wuzhou, was born in Brooklyn.
