= Jacobs, Iowa =

- Unincorporated community
- Location within Iowa
- Coordinates: 41°39′54″N 92°40′08″W
- Country: United States
- State: Iowa
- County: Poweshiek
- Elevation: 981 ft (299 m)
- Time zone: UTC-6 (Central (CST))
  - Summer (DST): UTC-5 (CDT)
- Area code: 641
- GNIS feature ID: 465418

Jacobs was an unincorporated community in Poweshiek County, in the U.S. state of Iowa.

== Geography ==
Jacobs was at 41°39′54″N 92°40′08″W where the Minneapolis and St. Louis Railway crossed what is now 60th Street.

== History ==
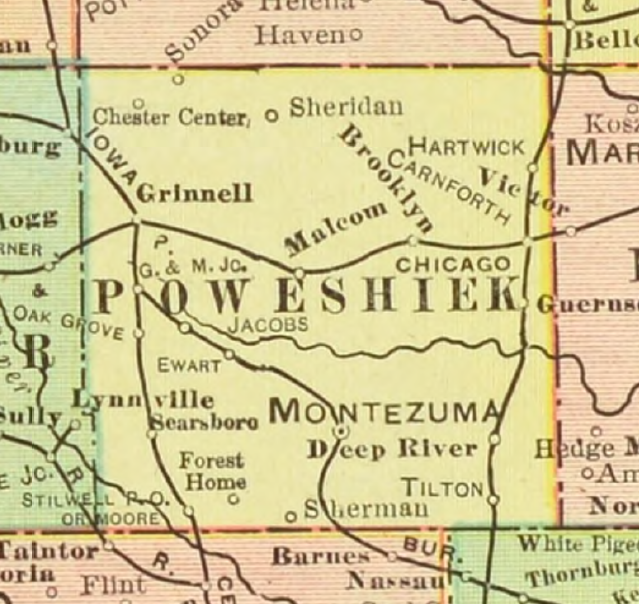
Jacobs in western Poweshiek County, Iowa, in 1902

A post office was established at Jacobs in 1896. Jacobs was located in Sections 11 and 12 of Washington Township, about five miles southeast of Grinnell. The community was along the Minneapolis and St. Louis Railway, which at that time was a major rail line in the American Midwest.

In addition to the rail station, Jacobs was the location of the Farmers' Cooperative Creamery and a butter factory.

The population of Jacobs was 17 in 1902.

The Jacobs post office was discontinued in 1913.

The population of the community was 21 in 1925, and was 10 in 1940.

== See also ==
- Zook Spur, Iowa, another central Iowa ghost town
