= Rollin Edelen =

American businessman and politician

Member of the Iowa House of Representatives from the 4th district
- In office January 8, 1973 – January 12, 1975
- Preceded by: Walter W. P. Kruse
- Succeeded by: Donald W. Spencer

Member of the Iowa House of Representatives from the 5th district
- In office January 11, 1971 – January 7, 1973
- Succeeded by: Lester Menke

Personal details
- Born: Rollin C. Edelen; May 17, 1908 Brooklyn, Iowa, U.S.
- Died: November 27, 1993 (aged 85) Estherville, Iowa, U.S.
- Party: Republican
- Spouse: Nina Montgomery (m. 1930)
- Relatives: Walter E. Edelen (brother)
- Education: University of Minnesota
- Occupation: Politician, businessman

Military service
- Allegiance: United States
- Branch/service: United States Army
- Battles/wars: World War II

Rollin C. Edelen (May 17, 1908 – November 27, 1993) was an American businessman and politician.

Born in Brooklyn, Iowa, Edelen went to school in Brooklyn and Hartwick, Iowa. He went to the University of Minnesota. During World War II, Edelen served in the United States Army and was stationed in the Pacific. He owned Estherville Concrete Productions in Estherville, Iowa, and was involved in the savings and loan business. Edelen served in the Iowa House of Representatives as a Republican representing Iowa's 5th District from 1971 to 1973 and Iowa's 4th District from 1973 to 1975. From 1977 to 1981, Edelen served on the Emmet County, Iowa Board of Supervisors. Edelen died in a hospital in Estherville, Iowa. His brother was Walter E. Edelen who also served in the Iowa General Assembly.
