= Montezuma, Iowa =

- City
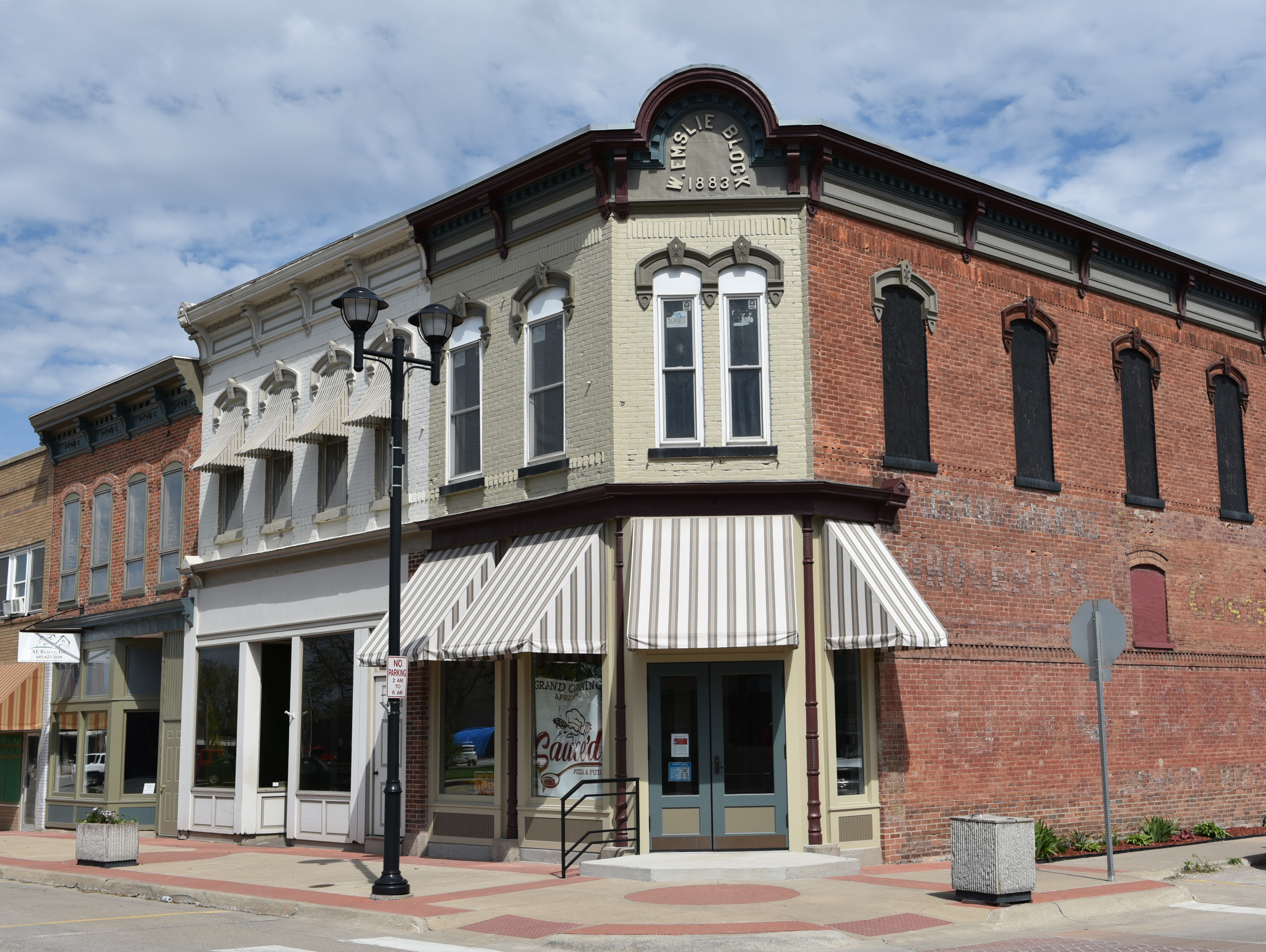
- Montezuma's Downtown District

- Location of Montezuma, Iowa
- Coordinates: 41°35′5″N 92°31′31″W
- Country: United States
- State: Iowa
- County: Poweshiek
- Established: 1848 (Incorporated 1868)

Government
  - Mayor: Colin Watts
  - Iowa House: Dean Fisher (R)
  - Iowa Senate: Annette Sweeney (R)
  - U.S. Congress: Ashley Hinson (R)

Area
  - Total: 2.49 sq mi (6.44 km^{2})
  - Land: 2.47 sq mi (6.40 km^{2})
  - Water: 0.015 sq mi (0.04 km^{2})
- Elevation: 950 ft (290 m)

Population (2020)
  - Total: 1,442
  - Density: 583.7/sq mi (225.37/km^{2})
- Time zone: UTC-6 (Central (CST))
  - Summer (DST): UTC-5 (CDT)
- ZIP code: 50171
- Area code: 641
- FIPS code: 19-53490
- GNIS feature ID: 0459191
- Website: montezumaiowa.org

Montezuma is a city in and the county seat of Poweshiek County, Iowa, United States. The population was 1,442 at the time of the 2020 census.

== Geography ==
Montezuma's longitude and latitude coordinates in decimal form are 41.584737, -92.525258.

According to the United States Census Bureau, the city has a total area of 2.49 square miles (6.45 km^{2}), of which 2.48 square miles (6.42 km^{2}) is land and 0.01 square miles (0.03 km^{2}) is water.

== History ==
Montezuma was first established in 1848, when local veterans of the Mexican–American War named the city after Moctezuma II, the second to last Aztec emperor of Mexico. Once a hub of regional railroad transport, Montezuma has continued to evolve and grow in a variety of ways. Montezuma was also a major stop on the stagecoach line between Iowa City and Des Moines on the original Diamond Trail.

Located on the southwest corner of Montezuma's square is the Poweshiek County Historical and Genealogical Society, located in the historic Carnegie library. Housed in the former Poweshiek County Jail is the Poweshiek County History Museum.

The Scott Township School No. 7, also known as the Fitzsimmons School, was moved from the original country landscape to the campus of the Poweshiek County Historical Society.

During the summer of 1934, Pentecostal evangelist Morris Plotts held tent revivals throughout south central Iowa, establishing churches in Oskaloosa, New Sharon, Grinnell, Montezuma, and Lynnville. While in Montezuma, Plotts was cited with public disturbance and jailed. He continued to minister from his cell and revival broke out in the jail. Plotts' six-month sentence was suspended for good behavior.

== Demographics ==
Historical populations
| Year | Pop. | ±% |
|---|---|---|
| 1860 | 564 | — |
| 1870 | 555 | −1.6% |
| 1880 | 921 | +65.9% |
| 1890 | 1,062 | +15.3% |
| 1900 | 1,210 | +13.9% |
| 1910 | 1,172 | −3.1% |
| 1920 | 1,273 | +8.6% |
| 1930 | 1,257 | −1.3% |
| 1940 | 1,477 | +17.5% |
| 1950 | 1,460 | −1.2% |
| 1960 | 1,416 | −3.0% |
| 1970 | 1,353 | −4.4% |
| 1980 | 1,485 | +9.8% |
| 1990 | 1,651 | +11.2% |
| 2000 | 1,440 | −12.8% |
| 2010 | 1,462 | +1.5% |
| 2020 | 1,442 | −1.4% |
Source:"U.S. Census website". United States Census Bureau. and Iowa Data Center; Source: U.S. Decennial Census

=== 2020 census ===
As of the 2020 census, Montezuma had a population of 1,442, with 615 households and 379 families residing in the city. The population density was 583.7 inhabitants per square mile (225.4/km^{2}). There were 669 housing units at an average density of 270.8 per square mile (104.6/km^{2}).

The median age was 39.1 years. 23.5% of residents were under the age of 18 and 22.9% were 65 years of age or older. 25.1% of residents were under the age of 20; 5.3% were between the ages of 20 and 24; 26.2% were from 25 to 44; and 20.5% were from 45 to 64. The gender makeup of the city was 48.2% male and 51.8% female. For every 100 females, there were 93.0 males, and for every 100 females age 18 and over there were 91.5 males age 18 and over.

Of the 615 households, 28.9% had children under the age of 18 living with them. Of all households, 46.2% were married-couple households, 10.2% were cohabiting-couple households, 18.0% were households with a male householder and no spouse or partner present, and 25.5% were households with a female householder and no spouse or partner present. 38.4% of all households were non-families; 32.0% of all households were made up of individuals, and 14.1% had someone living alone who was 65 years of age or older.

Of all housing units, 8.1% were vacant. The homeowner vacancy rate was 1.0% and the rental vacancy rate was 10.7%. 0.0% of residents lived in urban areas, while 100.0% lived in rural areas.

Racial composition as of the 2020 census
| Race | Number | Percent |
|---|---|---|
| White | 1,385 | 96.0% |
| Black or African American | 1 | 0.1% |
| American Indian and Alaska Native | 5 | 0.3% |
| Asian | 1 | 0.1% |
| Native Hawaiian and Other Pacific Islander | 0 | 0.0% |
| Some other race | 10 | 0.7% |
| Two or more races | 40 | 2.8% |
| Hispanic or Latino (of any race) | 29 | 2.0% |

=== 2010 census ===
As of the census of 2010, there were 1,462 people, 632 households, and 399 families living in the city. The population density was 589.5 inhabitants per square mile (227.6/km^{2}). There were 692 housing units at an average density of 279.0 per square mile (107.7/km^{2}). The racial makeup of the city was 98.2% White, 0.4% African American, 0.3% Native American, 0.1% Asian, 0.3% from other races, and 0.8% from two or more races. Hispanic or Latino of any race were 1.4% of the population.

There were 632 households, of which 29.4% had children under the age of 18 living with them, 48.4% were married couples living together, 10.0% had a female householder with no husband present, 4.7% had a male householder with no wife present, and 36.9% were non-families. 32.0% of all households were made up of individuals, and 14.9% had someone living alone who was 65 years of age or older. The average household size was 2.26 and the average family size was 2.83.

The median age in the city was 42.5 years. 23.5% of residents were under the age of 18; 7.3% were between the ages of 18 and 24; 23% were from 25 to 44; 26.4% were from 45 to 64; and 19.8% were 65 years of age or older. The gender makeup of the city was 47.4% male and 52.6% female.

=== 2000 census ===
As of the census of 2000, there were 1,440 people, 601 households, and 390 families living in the city. The population density was 586.9 inhabitants per square mile (226.6/km^{2}). There were 641 housing units at an average density of 261.3 per square mile (100.9/km^{2}). The racial makeup of the city was 98.75% White, 0.28% African American, 0.07% Native American, 0.35% Asian, and 0.56% from two or more races. Hispanic or Latino of any race were 0.42% of the population.

There were 601 households, out of which 28.3% had children under the age of 18 living with them, 53.7% were married couples living together, 7.8% had a female householder with no husband present, and 35.1% were non-families. 31.1% of all households were made up of individuals, and 16.1% had someone living alone who was 65 years of age or older. The average household size was 2.31 and the average family size was 2.91.

23.6% were under the age of 18, 8.9% from 18 to 24, 24.3% from 25 to 44, 20.8% from 45 to 64, and 22.4% were 65 years of age or older. The median age was 40 years. For every 100 females, there were 91.0 males. For every 100 females age 18 and over, there were 83.9 males.

The median income for a household in the city was $35,820, and the median income for a family was $43,083. Males had a median income of $31,483 versus $21,450 for females. The per capita income for the city was $17,806. About 3.8% of families and 6.4% of the population were below the poverty line, including 7.8% of those under age 18 and 5.8% of those age 65 or over.

== Education ==
Montezuma is home to the Montezuma Community School District, a K-12 school district. The mascots are the Braves and Bravettes and the school colors are blue and white.

Girls State Basketball Champions: 1969, 1970

Boys State Basketball Champions: 1971, 1990, 2021

== Attractions ==
Montezuma's agricultural heritage is celebrated in barn quilt art and renewed interest in local preservation has inspired many to continue living out that history. Montezuma is the inaugural home to the first town square Bill of Rights monument in the United States.

Poweshiek County Freedom Rock

Freedom Rock painter Raymond “Bubba” Sorensen II of Greenfield finished the Poweshiek County Freedom Rock in 2016, and is located on the southeast corner of the courthouse square.

Recreational and residential lakes

The development of Diamond Lake, Lake Ponderosa, and Lake Silverado add to the recreational options of the area. Green spaces and wildlife areas like Fox Forest offer hiking and equestrian trails, as well as observation of native vegetation and wildflowers. Nearby Fleming Woods State Preserve offers sanctuary to several species of other indigenous plant life and animals. It is believed that Chief Poweshiek and other Native Americans once lived in these areas.

== Media ==
Montezuma is served by The Record, a weekly newspaper that started in Deep River, Iowa, in 1899. It was resurrected and relocated to Montezuma in 2010, after longtime newspaper the Montezuma Republican merged with the Brooklyn Chronicle in 2009, to form the Poweshiek County Chronicle-Republican or CR in Grinnell. The Record is an official newspaper for Poweshiek County, City of Montezuma, City of Deep River, City of Brooklyn, and Montezuma Community School District.

=== Churches and denominations ===
Montezuma is home to several churches. These include the Community Hope Assembly of God, First Evangelical Presbyterian, United Methodist Church, Jackson Church of Christ, Faith Christian Center and West Liberty Church.

Several of these congregations offer Sunday and mid-week services as well as weekly Bible study groups, children's education programs, youth group activities, and missions work opportunities.

== Infrastructure ==
=== Self-Sustaining Municipalities ===
Montezuma has its own Water Department, with water sourced by nearby Diamond Lake.

In February 2024, Montezuma was selected as the nation's first microgrid community, in conjunction with the U.S. Department of Energy and Iowa State University.

=== Transportation ===
Montezuma is located approximately 8 miles south of the exit 191 on Interstate 80 on U.S. Route 63. The city is also serviced by Iowa Highway 85 and county road F57.

=== Healthcare ===
Montezuma residents have access to UnityPoint Health - Grinnell Montezuma Medical Clinic, located at 101 West Washington. When hospitalization is required the closest and most convenient hospital for residents is Grinnell Regional Medical Center, located at 210 4th Avenue in Grinnell, Iowa.

== Notable people ==
- Robin Brown (born 1961) teacher and member of the Minnesota House of Representatives
- Pete Brownell (American businessman) (born 1969) is the CEO of Brownells, founded by his grandfather, in Montezuma, Iowa.
- Thomas Jefferson Cowie (1857–1936) Rear admiral in the United States Navy with the destroyer USS Cowie (DD-632) named in his honor.
- Marsena E. Cutts (1833–1883) teacher, lawyer, and politician serving in both the Iowa House and Senate and the U.S. House.
- Dan Johnston (1938-2016), Iowa lawyer and state legislator
- Thomas Harris MacDonald (1881–1957) highway advocate and bureaucrat, chief of the Iowa State Highway Commission and both chief and commissioner of the Bureau of Public Roads.

== See also ==
- 10th Iowa Volunteer Infantry Regiment was an infantry regiment that served in the Union Army during the American Civil War.
- Poweshiek County Courthouse
- Central Iowa Railway
