= KSKB =

Christian radio station in Brooklyn, Iowa

- Brooklyn, Iowa; United States
- Broadcast area: Cedar Rapids; Iowa City; Marshalltown; Pella
- Frequency: 99.1 MHz

Programming
- Format: Christian radio

Ownership
- Owner: Florida Public Radio, Inc.

History
- First air date: March 1, 1988
- Call sign meaning: "Keep Smiling Keep Believing"

Technical information
- Licensing authority: FCC
- Facility ID: 21790
- Class: C2
- ERP: 44,000 watts
- HAAT: 160 meters (520 ft)
- Transmitter coordinates: 41°41′23″N 92°21′31″W

Links
- Public license information: Public file; LMS
- Website: kskb.net

KSKB is a Christian radio station licensed to Brooklyn, Iowa, broadcasting on 99.1 MHz. KSKB serves East Central Iowa including; Cedar Rapids, Iowa City, Marshalltown, Pella, Newton and Oskaloosa. The station is owned by Florida Public Radio, Inc. The station began broadcasting March 1, 1988, and originally broadcast at 99.3 MHz.

== Translators ==
KSKB is also heard in Waterloo, Iowa through a translator on 99.7 FM.

Call sign	Frequency	City of license	FID	ERP (W)	Class	FCC info
K259AV	99.7 FM	Waterloo, Iowa	156861	115	D	LMS
