= Madison Township, Poweshiek County, Iowa =

Township in Iowa, USA

Coordinates: 41°49′N 92°28′W

Madison Township is a township in Poweshiek County, Iowa, USA.
