= Thomas H. Miller (Iowa newspaperman) =

American newspaper editor and politician

Thomas H. Miller (April 11, 1925 – May 25, 2001) was an American newspaper editor and politician.

Born in Park Rapids, Minnesota, Miller graduated from Washington High School in Brainerd, Minnesota. He then served in the United States Navy during World War II. He was in the newspaper business with The Minot Daily News in Minot, ND and The Argus Leader in Sioux Falls, SD before venturing into newspaper ownership. In 1969, Miller purchased the Cherokee Daily Times, in Cherokee, Iowa. He retired in 1984. From 1985 to 1995, Miller served in the Iowa House of Representatives as a Republican. He died in Cherokee, Iowa.
