= Ramsey Creek (Castor River Diversion Channel tributary) =

Stream in the American state of Missouri

Coordinates: 37.244773°N 89.551202°W

Ramsey Creek is a stream in Cape Girardeau and Scott counties, in the U.S. state of Missouri. It is a tributary of the Castor River Diversion Channel.

Ramsey Creek was named for Andrew Ramsay, an early settler.

== See also ==
- List of rivers of Missouri
