= Deep River, Iowa =

- City
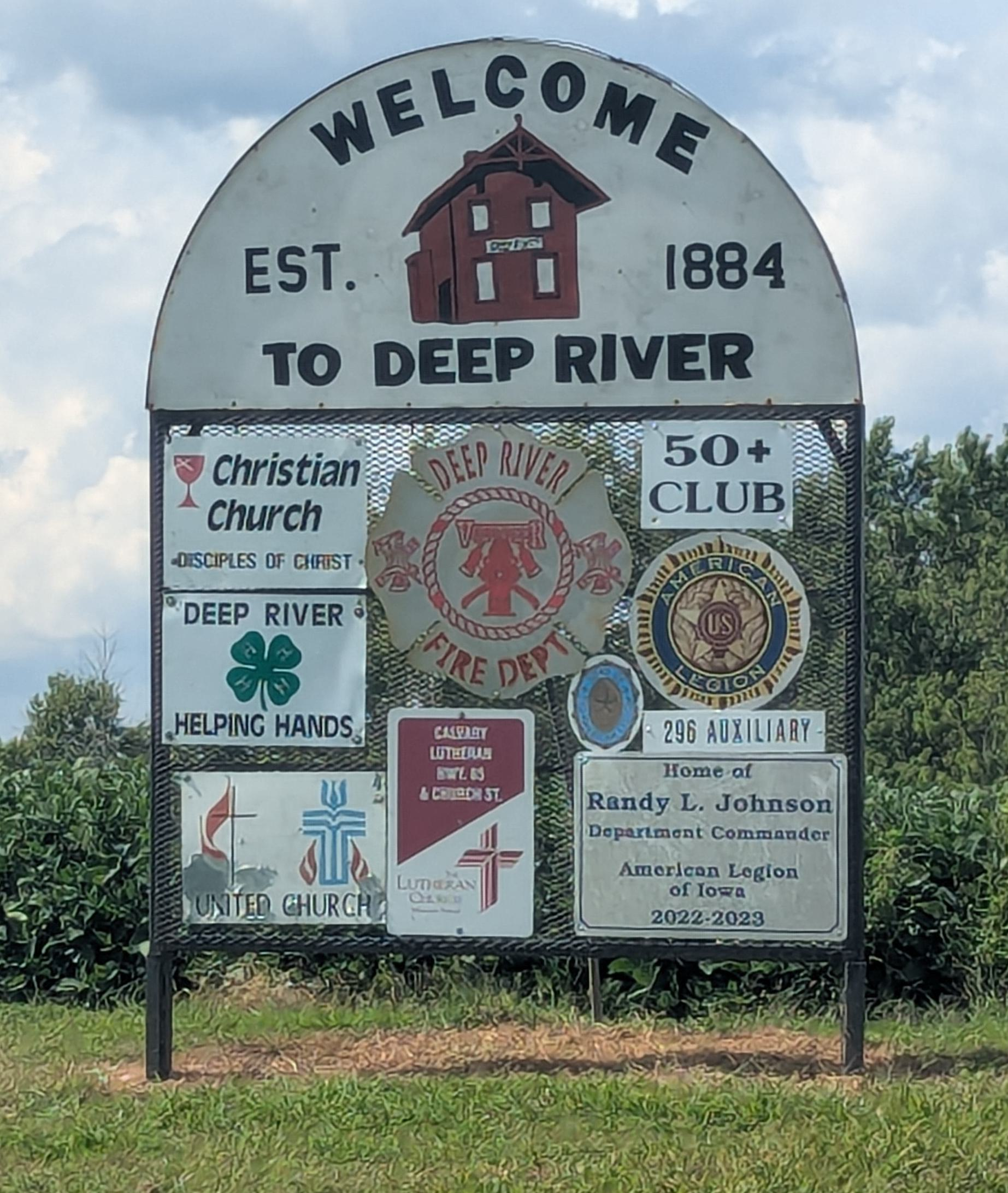
- Welcome sign

- Location of Deep River, Iowa
- Coordinates: 41°34′49″N 92°22′27″W
- Country: United States
- State: Iowa
- County: Poweshiek

Government
  - Mayor: Derec Koch
  - Iowa House: Dean Fisher (R)
  - Iowa Senate: Annette Sweeney (R)
  - U.S. Congress: Ashley Hinson (R)

Area
  - Total: 0.44 sq mi (1.13 km^{2})
  - Land: 0.44 sq mi (1.13 km^{2})
  - Water: 0 sq mi (0.00 km^{2})
- Elevation: 909 ft (277 m)

Population (2020)
  - Total: 249
  - Density: 569.3/sq mi (219.79/km^{2})
- Time zone: UTC-6 (Central (CST))
  - Summer (DST): UTC-5 (CDT)
- ZIP code: 52222
- Area code: 641
- FIPS code: 19-19495
- GNIS feature ID: 0455847

Deep River is a city in Poweshiek County, Iowa, United States. It is also the name of the township which includes the city. The city population was 249 at the time of the 2020 census.

== Geography ==
Deep River is located at 41°34′49″N 92°22′27″W (41.580395, -92.374249). According to the United States Census Bureau, the city has a total area of 0.43 square miles (1.11 km^{2}), all land.

== Brief history and etymology ==
In 1856 the town of Dresden, approximately one mile east of the present town of Deep River, was platted. The Whitney brothers operated a store there for about 20 years. When the Chicago and North Western Railway was built, the residents of Dresden moved to be near the railroad, and thus the town of Deep River was established in 1884. The Dresden Cemetery lies about a mile and a half south of the current county road, locally known as the Diamond Trail, just about a quarter mile east of Iowa Highway 21. The town of Tilton was established at the southern border of the township in 1884 as well, although this largely lay in Keokuk County.

=== Deep River Township ===
Deep River Township was organized March 7, 1857. It was, at first, a part of Jackson Township. It derived its name from the stream flowing through its northern part, but not because the water was so deep, but rather it was so far down to the water. The first settlers to live in Deep River Township were Robert Taylor and family from Ohio; John Sargood, whose father was from England; Albert Morgan and family from Ohio; and the Lights, who came from Virginia in 1849. The first post office was established in 1852, and called Deep River. The first marriage was that of Nancy Taylor to Rev. W. H. Palmer in 1849. James Light and James Rundle settled in that same year.

The first township election was held in 1857 with the following officers: Ephraim Cox, Asa Cohoe and John Morgan, trustees; Myron Whitney, clerk; L. Mayo, C. M. Wolcott, justices of the peace; H. Armstrong and C. Barber, constables; and James Hillman, road supervisor.

=== Town of Deep River ===
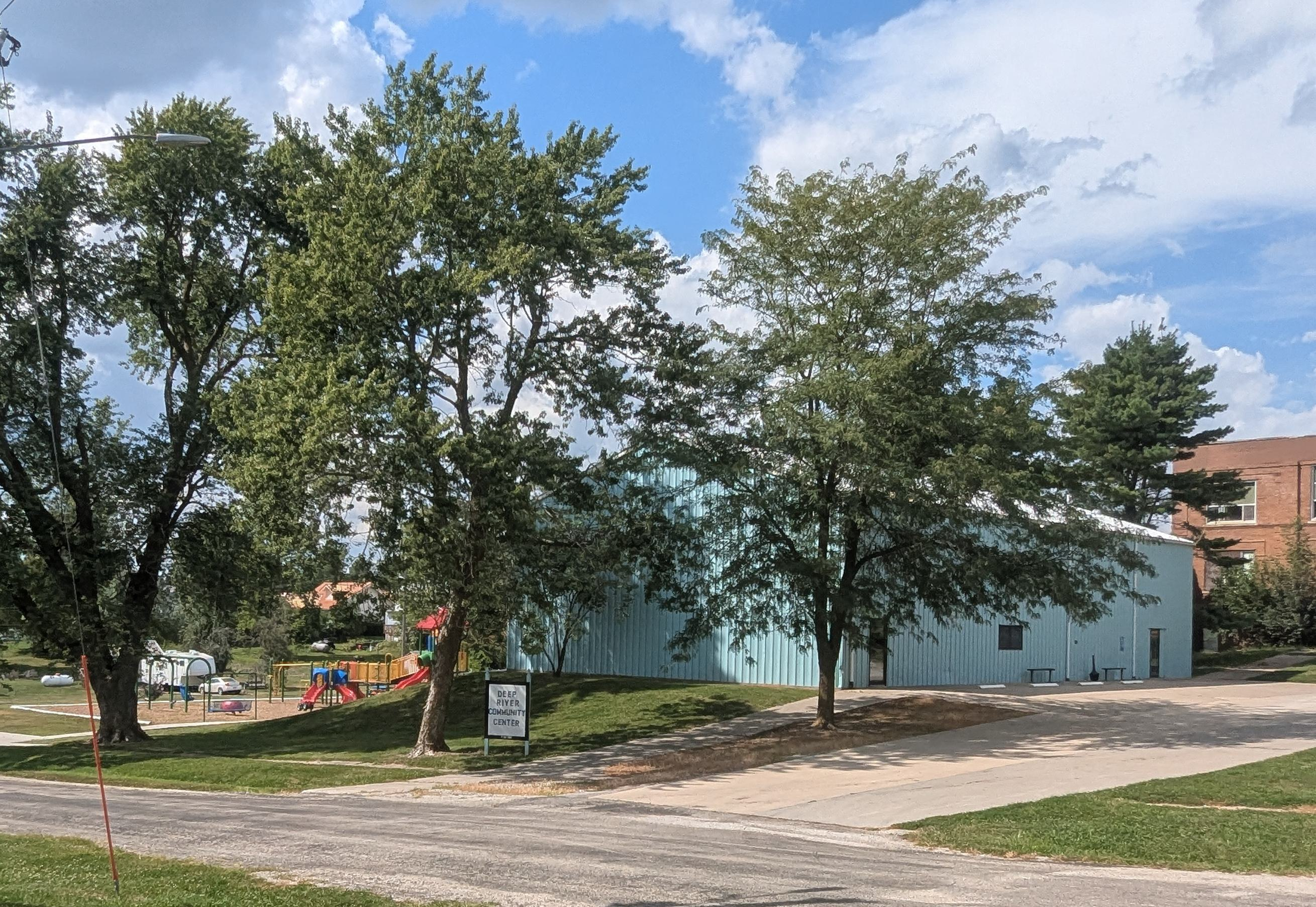
Deep River Community Center

The town of Deep River was incorporated in the summer of 1887 after the Northwestern Railroad spur from Belle Plaine to Muchakinock in southern Iowa was built. Horace Phelps built a depot and gave the railroad $1,500 to secure the location there. The citizens of Dresden then soon followed and the new town of Deep River grew, leaving Dresden largely uninhabited. The first town election resulted in the following officers: J. S. Potter, Mayor; S. S. Jenkins, recorder; J. C. Sanders, treasurer; C. F. Cutler, assessor; James Sargood, marshal; A. C. Converse, Charles Lacher, N. M. Valentine, J. P. Sargood, E. T. Whitney and James Light, councilmen.

The Deep River flows nearby; it is a minor tributary of the English River. The town and its namesake river were named not for the depth of the water in the Deep River, but for the depth of the ravine through which it flows. At some places the banks are 20 ft (6.1 m) above the normal water level.

On May 14, 1970, the local area was subjected to a significant flood on the Deep River which was assessed as having a greater than 50 year recurrence interval. The stream gauge on the Deep River station measured a record stage of 83.85 feet (25.56 m) and with a stream flow of 6,200 cubic feet per second (180 m^{3}/s)

== Demographics ==
Historical populations
Year	Pop.	±%
1890	291	—
1900	403	+38.5%
1910	467	+15.9%
1920	487	+4.3%
1930	392	−19.5%
1940	443	+13.0%
1950	379	−14.4%
1960	329	−13.2%
1970	323	−1.8%
1980	323	+0.0%
1990	345	+6.8%
2000	288	−16.5%
2010	279	−3.1%
2020	249	−10.8%
Source:"U.S. Census website". United States Census Bureau. and Iowa Data Center; Source: U.S. Decennial Census

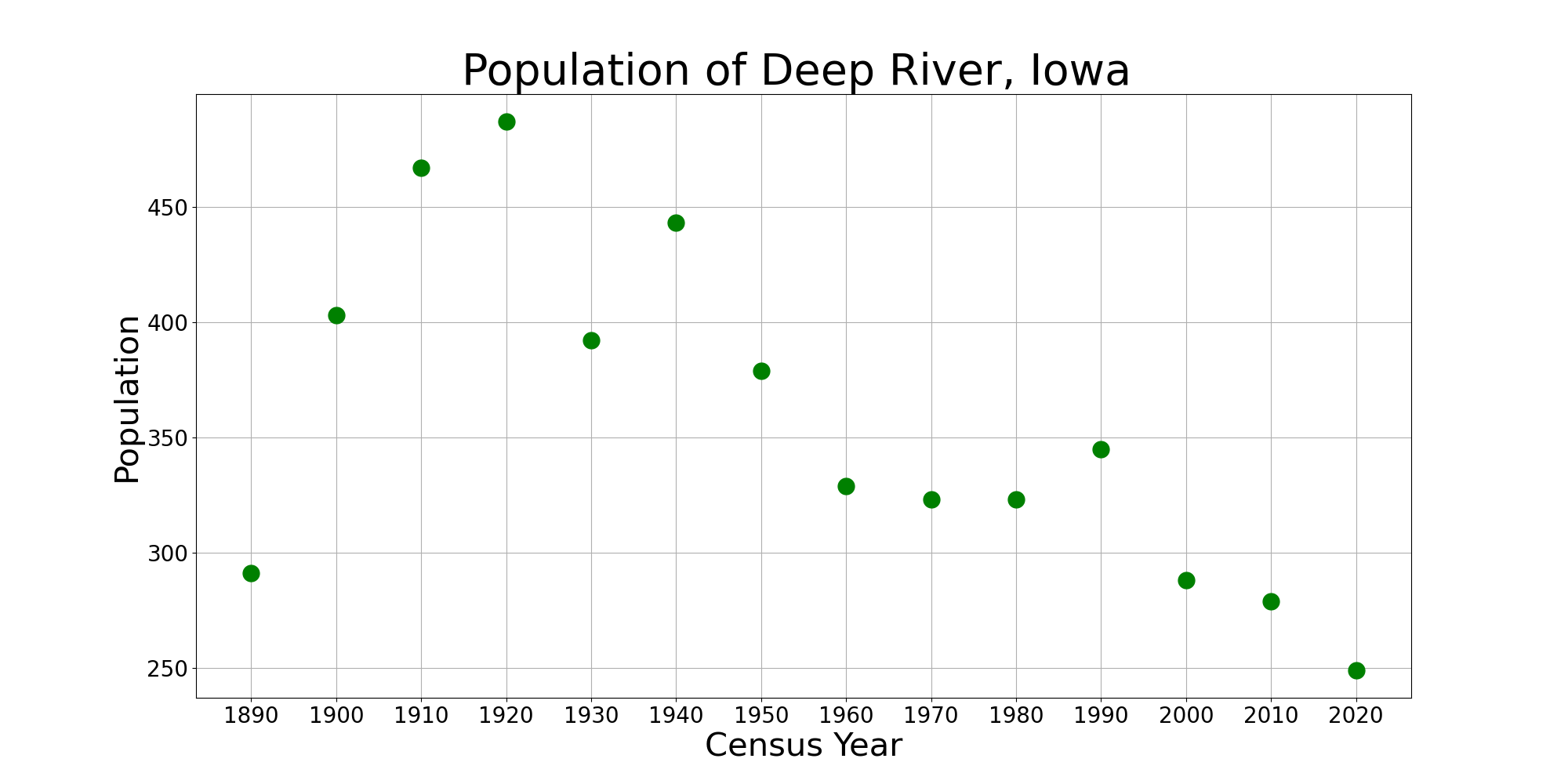
The population of Deep River, Iowa from US census data

=== 2020 census ===
As of the census of 2020, there were 249 people, 103 households, and 73 families residing in the city. The population density was 569.3 inhabitants per square mile (219.8/km^{2}). There were 122 housing units at an average density of 278.9 per square mile (107.7/km^{2}). The racial makeup of the city was 99.6% White, 0.0% Black or African American, 0.0% Native American, 0.0% Asian, 0.0% Pacific Islander, 0.4% from other races and 0.0% from two or more races. Hispanic or Latino persons of any race comprised 2.0% of the population.

Of the 103 households, 37.9% of which had children under the age of 18 living with them, 48.5% were married couples living together, 9.7% were cohabitating couples, 28.2% had a female householder with no spouse or partner present and 13.6% had a male householder with no spouse or partner present. 29.1% of all households were non-families. 23.3% of all households were made up of individuals, 5.8% had someone living alone who was 65 years old or older.

The median age in the city was 40.3 years. 26.1% of the residents were under the age of 20; 4.0% were between the ages of 20 and 24; 24.5% were from 25 and 44; 28.9% were from 45 and 64; and 16.5% were 65 years of age or older. The gender makeup of the city was 48.6% male and 51.4% female.

=== 2010 census ===
As of the census of 2010, there were 279 people, 119 households, and 75 families residing in the city. The population density was 648.8 inhabitants per square mile (250.5/km^{2}). There were 130 housing units at an average density of 302.3 per square mile (116.7/km^{2}). The racial makeup of the city was 100.0% White.

There were 119 households, of which 31.9% had children under the age of 18 living with them, 47.9% were married couples living together, 6.7% had a female householder with no husband present, 8.4% had a male householder with no wife present, and 37.0% were non-families. 30.3% of all households were made up of individuals, and 18.5% had someone living alone who was 65 years of age or older. The average household size was 2.34 and the average family size was 2.95.

The median age in the city was 37.7 years. 24.7% of residents were under the age of 18; 6.7% were between the ages of 18 and 24; 25.9% were from 25 to 44; 24% were from 45 to 64; and 18.6% were 65 years of age or older. The gender makeup of the city was 50.5% male and 49.5% female.

=== 2000 census ===
As of the census of 2000, there were 288 people, 120 households, and 80 families residing in the city. The population density was 681.1 inhabitants per square mile (263.0/km^{2}). There were 135 housing units at an average density of 319.3 per square mile (123.3/km^{2}). The racial makeup of the city was 100.00% White. Hispanic or Latino of any race were 1.04% of the population.

There were 120 households, out of which 32.5% had children under the age of 18 living with them, 55.8% were married couples living together, 5.0% had a female householder with no husband present, and 33.3% were non-families. 28.3% of all households were made up of individuals, and 17.5% had someone living alone who was 65 years of age or older. The average household size was 2.40 and the average family size was 2.98.

Age/Gender Breakdown: 27.1% under the age of 18, 6.3% from 18 to 24, 30.2% from 25 to 44, 23.6% from 45 to 64, and 12.8% who were 65 years of age or older. The median age was 36 years. For every 100 females, there were 87.0 males. For every 100 females age 18 and over, there were 90.9 males.

The median income for a household in the city was $33,438, and the median income for a family was $46,875. Males had a median income of $29,643 versus $17,639 for females. The per capita income for the city was $16,437. About 4.9% of families and 5.6% of the population were below the poverty line, including 5.6% of those under the age of eighteen and 10.0% of those 65 or over.

== Education ==
Deep River is mostly within the Montezuma Community School District and partially in the English Valleys Community School District.

The community was previously located within the Deep River–Millersburg Community School District (DR-M), which was established in 1958 as a consolidation of the Deep River and Millersburg school districts. In 1992 the district closed its secondary school and began a joint whole grade-sharing program with the English Valleys district and that of the Montezuma, in which it sent its junior and senior high school students to both districts; each student chose which secondary school to attend. The Deep River grade school was closed that year, with elementary school students moved to Millersburg, as the district found the layout of the latter more useful. On July 1, 2009, the DR-M district was consolidated into the English Valleys district, although a portion of it was given to the Montezuma district.

== Media ==
Deep River is served by The Record, a weekly newspaper that started in Deep River, Iowa, in 1899. The Record is an official newspaper for Poweshiek County, City of Montezuma, City of Deep River, City of Brooklyn, and Montezuma Community School District.
