= Hartwick, Iowa =

- City
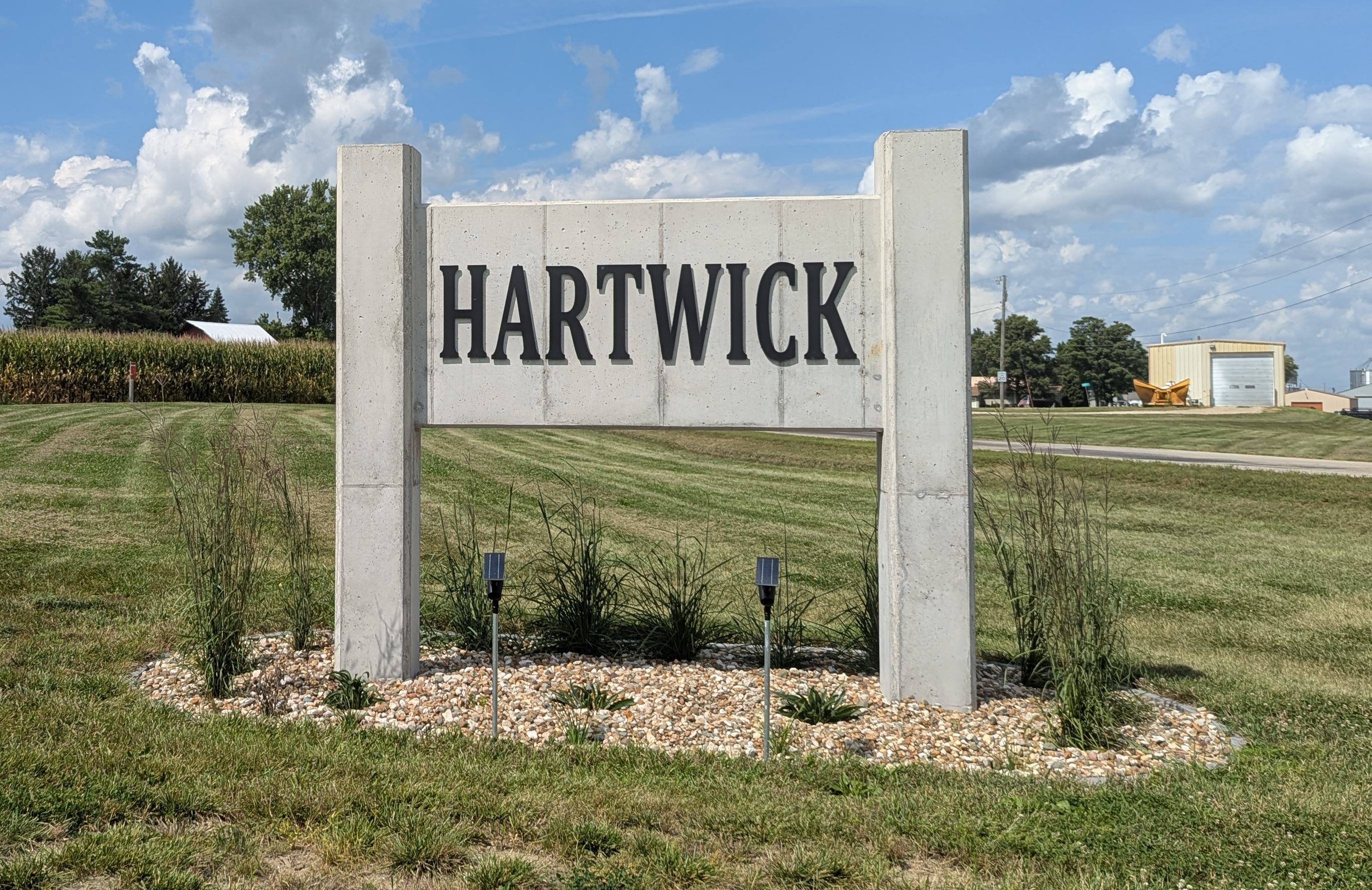
- Welcome sign

- Location of Hartwick, Iowa
- Coordinates: 41°47′7″N 92°20′39″W
- Country: United States
- State: Iowa
- County: Poweshiek
- Established: 1885

Area
  - Total: 0.16 sq mi (0.41 km^{2})
  - Land: 0.16 sq mi (0.41 km^{2})
  - Water: 0 sq mi (0.00 km^{2})
- Elevation: 928 ft (283 m)

Population (2020)
  - Total: 92
  - Density: 581.9/sq mi (224.66/km^{2})
- Time zone: UTC-6 (Central (CST))
  - Summer (DST): UTC-5 (CDT)
- ZIP code: 52232
- Area code: 319
- FIPS code: 19-34770
- GNIS feature ID: 0457304

Hartwick is a city in Poweshiek County, Iowa, United States. The population was 92 at the time of the 2020 census.

== Geography ==
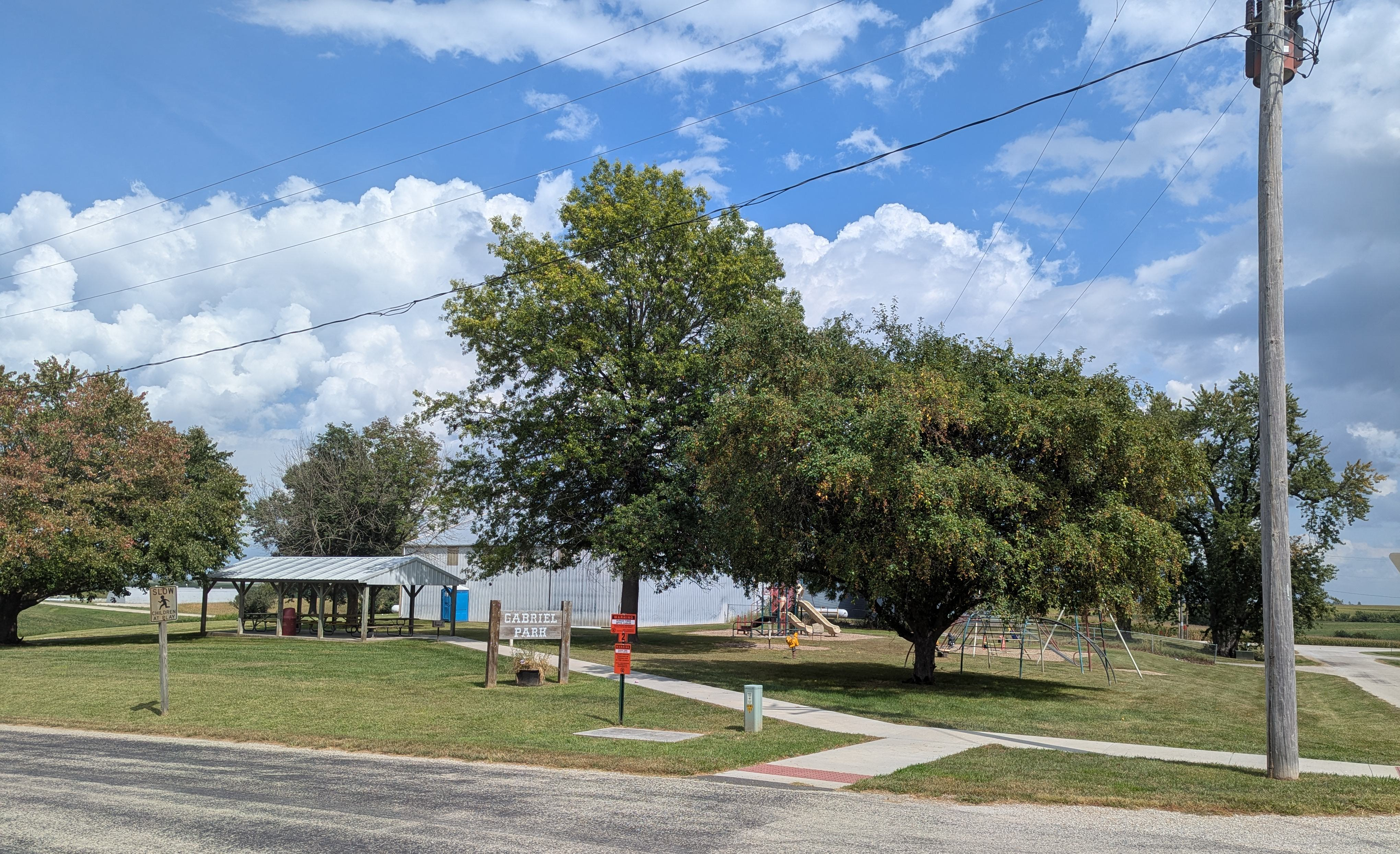
Gabriel Park in Hartwick

Hartwick is located at 41°47′7″N 92°20′39″W (41.785264, -92.344290).

According to the United States Census Bureau, the city has a total area of 0.13 square miles (0.34 km^{2}), all land.

== Demographics ==
Historical populations
Year	Pop.	±%
1920	107	—
1930	122	+14.0%
1940	122	+0.0%
1950	107	−12.3%
1960	126	+17.8%
1970	101	−19.8%
1980	92	−8.9%
1990	115	+25.0%
2000	83	−27.8%
2010	86	+3.6%
2020	92	+7.0%
Source:"U.S. Census website". United States Census Bureau. and Iowa Data Center; Source: U.S. Decennial Census

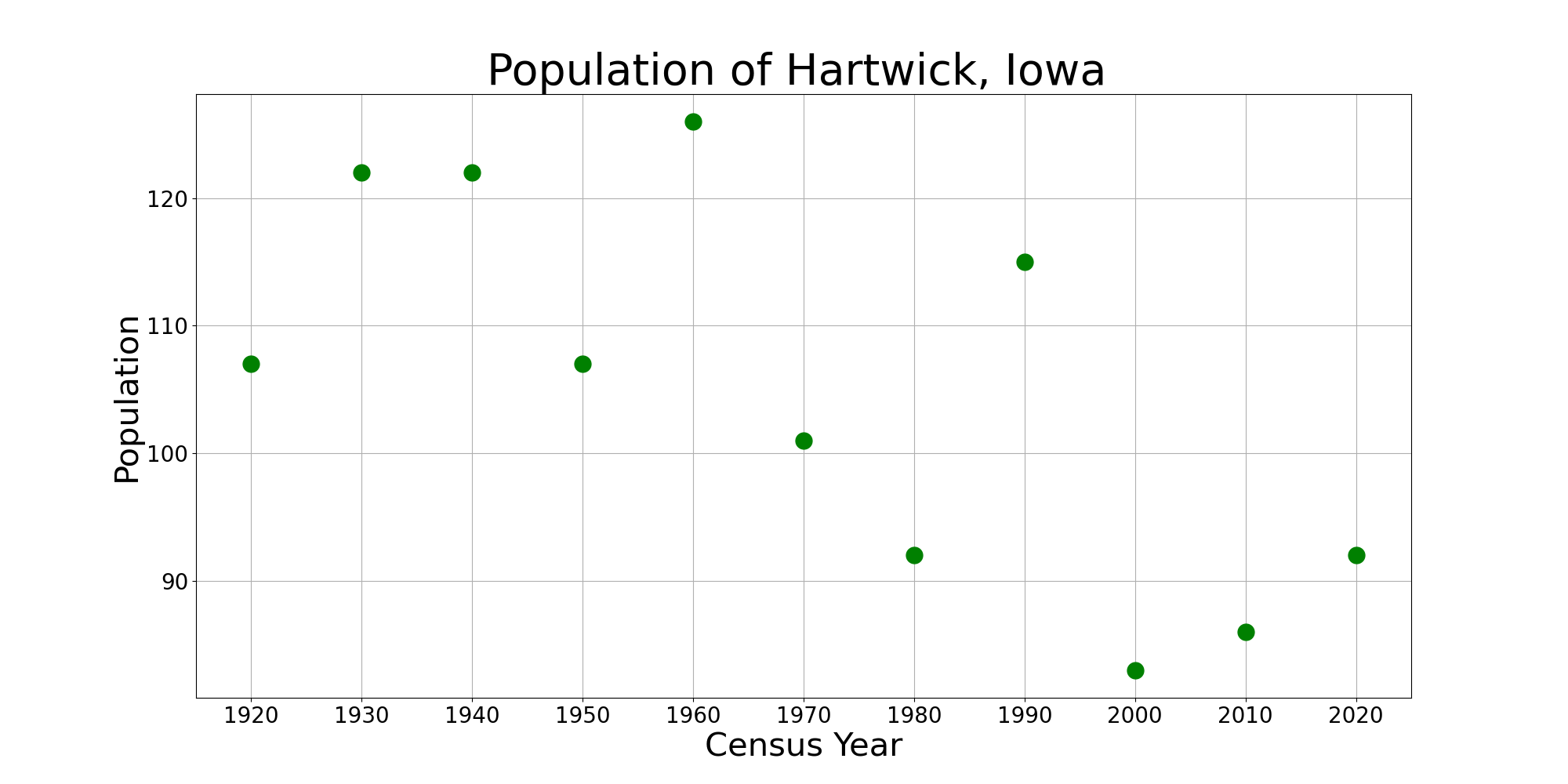
The population of Hartwick, Iowa from US census data

=== 2020 census ===
As of the census of 2020, there were 92 people, 39 households, and 35 families residing in the city. The population density was 581.9 inhabitants per square mile (224.7/km^{2}). There were 39 housing units at an average density of 246.7 per square mile (95.2/km^{2}). The racial makeup of the city was 96.7% White, 0.0% Black or African American, 1.1% Native American, 0.0% Asian, 0.0% Pacific Islander, 2.2% from other races and 0.0% from two or more races. Hispanic or Latino persons of any race comprised 5.4% of the population.

Of the 39 households, 46.2% of which had children under the age of 18 living with them, 71.8% were married couples living together, 10.3% were cohabitating couples, 7.7% had a female householder with no spouse or partner present and 10.3% had a male householder with no spouse or partner present. 10.3% of all households were non-families. 5.1% of all households were made up of individuals, 2.6% had someone living alone who was 65 years old or older.

The median age in the city was 31.0 years. 33.7% of the residents were under the age of 20; 3.3% were between the ages of 20 and 24; 25.0% were from 25 and 44; 23.9% were from 45 and 64; and 14.1% were 65 years of age or older. The gender makeup of the city was 45.7% male and 54.3% female.

=== 2010 census ===
As of the census of 2010, there were 86 people, 38 households, and 25 families living in the city. The population density was 661.5 inhabitants per square mile (255.4/km^{2}). There were 40 housing units at an average density of 307.7 per square mile (118.8/km^{2}). The racial makeup of the city was 97.7% White and 2.3% from two or more races.

There were 38 households, of which 31.6% had children under the age of 18 living with them, 50.0% were married couples living together, 5.3% had a female householder with no husband present, 10.5% had a male householder with no wife present, and 34.2% were non-families. 28.9% of all households were made up of individuals, and 10.5% had someone living alone who was 65 years of age or older. The average household size was 2.26 and the average family size was 2.68.

The median age in the city was 35 years. 22.1% of residents were under the age of 18; 8.2% were between the ages of 18 and 24; 27.9% were from 25 to 44; 24.5% were from 45 to 64; and 17.4% were 65 years of age or older. The gender makeup of the city was 48.8% male and 51.2% female.

=== 2000 census ===
As of the census of 2000, there were 83 people, 36 households, and 24 families living in the city. The population density was 640.7 inhabitants per square mile (247.4/km^{2}). There were 40 housing units at an average density of 308.8 per square mile (119.2/km^{2}). The racial makeup of the city was 100.00% White.

There were 36 households, out of which 27.8% had children under the age of 18 living with them, 66.7% were married couples living together, 2.8% had a female householder with no husband present, and 30.6% were non-families. 27.8% of all households were made up of individuals, and 19.4% had someone living alone who was 65 years of age or older. The average household size was 2.31 and the average family size was 2.84.

In the city, the population was spread out, with 20.5% under the age of 18, 7.2% from 18 to 24, 26.5% from 25 to 44, 26.5% from 45 to 64, and 19.3% who were 65 years of age or older. The median age was 40 years. For every 100 females, there were 88.6 males. For every 100 females age 18 and over, there were 83.3 males.

The median income for a household in the city was $36,250, and the median income for a family was $43,750. Males had a median income of $33,750 versus $21,875 for females. The per capita income for the city was $18,830. There were no families and 2.7% of the population living below the poverty line, including no under eighteens and none of those over 64.

== Education ==
H-L-V Community School District operates area public schools.
