= Jackson Township, Poweshiek County, Iowa =

Township in Iowa, USA

Coordinates: 41°33′N 92°29′W

Jackson Township is a township in Poweshiek County, Iowa, USA.
