= Ramsey Creek (Minnesota) =

Stream in Minnesota, U.S.

Coordinates: 44°32′44″N 95°07′31″W

Ramsey Creek is a stream in the U.S. state of Minnesota.

Ramsey Creek was named for Alexander Ramsey, first territorial governor and second governor of Minnesota.

== See also ==
- List of rivers of Minnesota
