= Walter E. Edelen =

American businessman and politician

Member of the Iowa Senate from the 43rd district
- In office January 12, 1959 – January 8, 1961
- Preceded by: William H. Tate
- Succeeded by: Leigh Raymond Curran

Personal details
- Born: Walter Edward Edelen; September 9, 1911 Brooklyn, Iowa, U.S.
- Died: November 18, 1991 (aged 80) Mason City, Iowa, U.S.
- Party: Democratic
- Spouse: Mildred Rinnan January (m. 1935)
- Children: 3
- Relatives: Rollin Edelen (brother)
- Occupation: Politician, businessman

Walter Edward Edelen (September 9, 1911 – November 18, 1991) was an American politician and businessman.

Born in Brooklyn, Iowa, Edelen graduated from Brooklyn High School. He worked in the grocery business and was involved with the real estate business. Edelen lived in Garner, Iowa. He was also a farmer. Edelen served in the Iowa State Senate from 1959 to 1961 and was a Democrat. From 1963 to 1969, Edelen served on the Iowa Liquor Commission and was chairman of the commission. Edelen died in a hospital in Mason City, Iowa. His brother was Rollin Edelen who also served in the Iowa General Assembly.
