= Carnforth, Iowa =

- Unincorporated community
- Location within Iowa
- Coordinates: 41°43′20″N 92°20′59″W
- Country: United States
- State: Iowa
- County: Poweshiek
- Elevation: 830 ft (250 m)
- Time zone: UTC-6 (Central (CST))
  - Summer (DST): UTC-5 (CDT)
- Area code: 641
- GNIS feature ID: 455178

Carnforth is an unincorporated community in Poweshiek County, in the U.S. state of Iowa.

== History ==
A post office was established as Manatt in 1884, and renamed Carnforth after two months. The Carnforth post office was discontinued in 1907. A railroad official selected the place name Carnforth from a book he was reading at the time. Carnforth's population was 33 in 1902, and 40 in 1925. The population was 31 in 1940.
