= Deep River Township, Poweshiek County, Iowa =

Township in Poweshiek County, Iowa, U.S.

Coordinates: 41°33′N 92°21′W

Deep River Township is a township in Poweshiek County, Iowa, USA.
