= Guernsey, Iowa =

- City
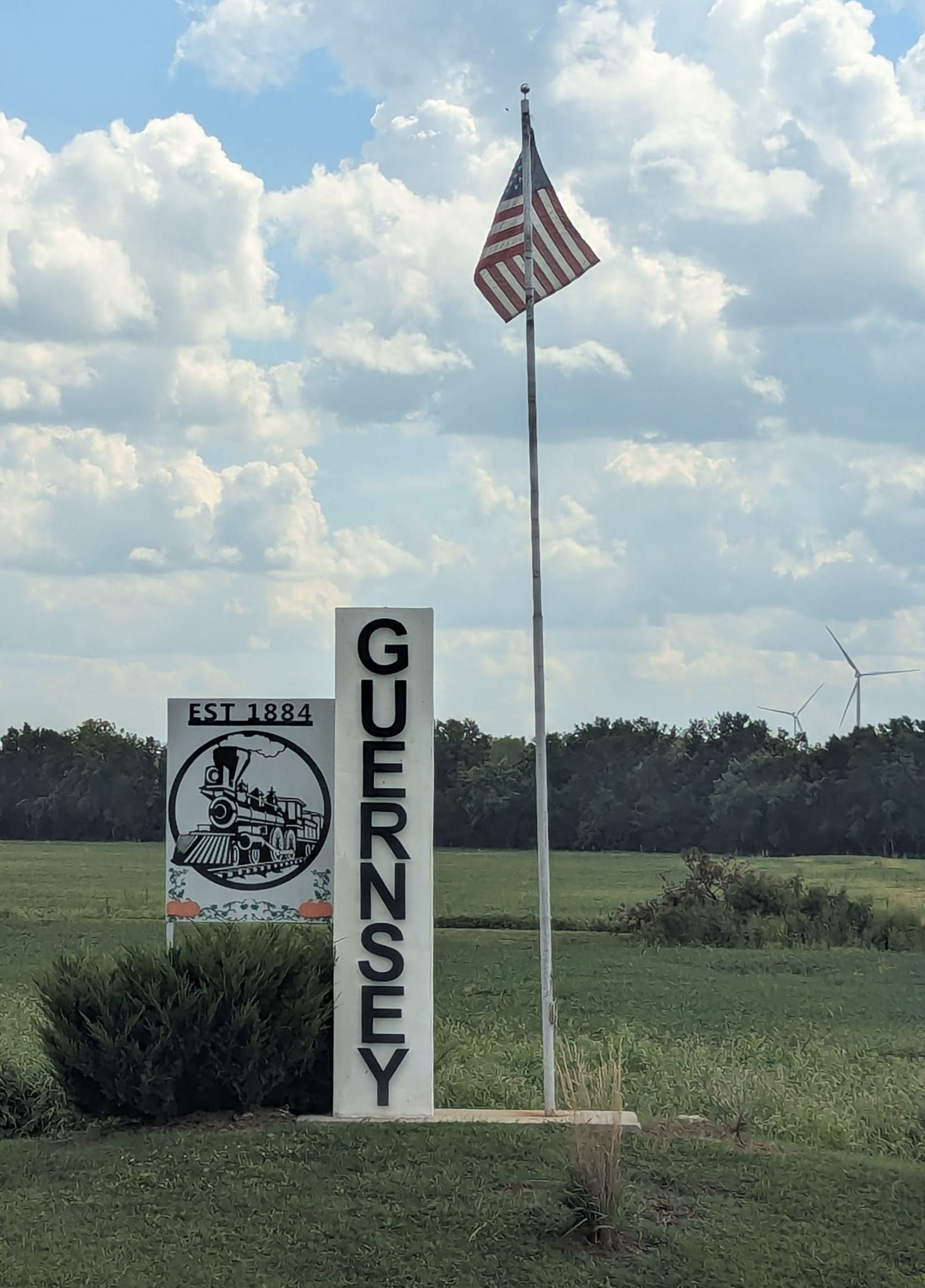
- Welcome sign

- Location of Guernsey, Iowa
- Coordinates: 41°39′0″N 92°20′40″W
- Country: United States
- State: Iowa
- County: Poweshiek

Area
  - Total: 0.56 sq mi (1.46 km^{2})
  - Land: 0.56 sq mi (1.46 km^{2})
  - Water: 0 sq mi (0.00 km^{2})
- Elevation: 823 ft (251 m)

Population (2020)
  - Total: 63
  - Density: 112.0/sq mi (43.25/km^{2})
- Time zone: UTC-6 (Central (CST))
  - Summer (DST): UTC-5 (CDT)
- ZIP code: 52221
- Area code: 319
- FIPS code: 19-33285
- GNIS feature ID: 0457176

Guernsey is a city in Poweshiek County, Iowa, United States. The population was 63 at the time of the 2020 census.

== History ==
Guernsey was platted in 1884. It was named after Guernsey County, Ohio. A post office was first established in Guernsey in 1884.

== Geography ==
According to the United States Census Bureau, the town has a total area of 0.18 square miles (0.47 km^{2}), all land.

== Demographics ==
Historical populations
Year	Pop.	±%
1910	143	—
1920	167	+16.8%
1930	177	+6.0%
1940	121	−31.6%
1950	113	−6.6%
1960	108	−4.4%
1970	94	−13.0%
1980	83	−11.7%
1990	70	−15.7%
2000	70	+0.0%
2010	63	−10.0%
2020	63	+0.0%
Source:"U.S. Census website". United States Census Bureau. and Iowa Data Center; Source: U.S. Decennial Census

=== 2020 census ===
As of the census of 2020, there were 63 people, 31 households, and 19 families residing in the city. The population density was 112.0 inhabitants per square mile (43.3/km^{2}). There were 32 housing units at an average density of 56.9 per square mile (22.0/km^{2}). The racial makeup of the city was 95.2% White, 0.0% Black or African American, 1.6% Native American, 0.0% Asian, 0.0% Pacific Islander, 1.6% from other races and 1.6% from two or more races. Hispanic or Latino persons of any race comprised 1.6% of the population.

Of the 31 households, 35.5% of which had children under the age of 18 living with them, 45.2% were married couples living together, 9.7% were cohabitating couples, 29.0% had a female householder with no spouse or partner present and 16.1% had a male householder with no spouse or partner present. 38.7% of all households were non-families. 29.0% of all households were made up of individuals, 12.9% had someone living alone who was 65 years old or older.

The median age in the city was 48.9 years. 11.1% of the residents were under the age of 20; 11.1% were between the ages of 20 and 24; 19.0% were from 25 and 44; 30.2% were from 45 and 64; and 28.6% were 65 years of age or older. The gender makeup of the city was 49.2% male and 50.8% female.

=== 2010 census ===
As of the census of 2010, there were 63 people, 27 households, and 18 families living in the town. The population density was 350.0 inhabitants per square mile (135.1/km^{2}). There were 32 housing units at an average density of 177.8 per square mile (68.6/km^{2}). The racial makeup of the city was 96.8% White. Hispanic or Latino of any race were 3.2% of the population.

There were 27 households, of which 22.2% had children under the age of 18 living with them, 55.6% were married couples living together, 11.1% had a female householder with no husband present, and 33.3% were non-families. 25.9% of all households were made up of individuals, and 11.1% had someone living alone who was 65 years of age or older. The average household size was 2.33 and the average family size was 2.83.

The median age in the town was 43.8 years. 23.8% of residents were under the age of 18; 6.3% were between the ages of 18 and 24; 22.2% were from 25 to 44; 19.1% were from 45 to 64; and 28.6% were 65 years of age or older. The gender makeup of the town was 52.4% male and 47.6% female.

=== 2000 census ===
As of the census of 2000, there were 70 people, 29 households, and 20 families living in the town. The population density was 379.8 inhabitants per square mile (146.6/km^{2}). There were 34 housing units at an average density of 184.5 per square mile (71.2/km^{2}). The racial makeup of the city was 94.29% White, 1.43% Native American, 2.86% from other races, and 1.43% from two or more races. Hispanic or Latino of any race were 4.29% of the population.

There were 29 households, out of which 34.5% had children under the age of 18 living with them, 62.1% were married couples living together, 3.4% had a female householder with no husband present, and 31.0% were non-families. 31.0% of all households were made up of individuals, and 6.9% had someone living alone who was 65 years of age or older. The average household size was 2.41 and the average family size was 3.05.

In the town, the population was spread out, with 28.6% under the age of 18, 5.7% from 18 to 24, 24.3% from 25 to 44, 32.9% from 45 to 64, and 8.6% who were 65 years of age or older. The median age was 35 years. For every 100 females, there were 118.8 males. For every 100 females age 18 and over, there were 127.3 males.

The median income for a household in the city was $36,250, and the median income for a family was $46,250. Males had a median income of $26,250 versus $16,458 for females. The per capita income for the city was $17,727. None of the population and none of the families were below the poverty line.

== Education ==
The BGM Community School District operates the local area public schools. BGM Community School District was formed in 1960 with the merger of schools in Brooklyn, Guernsey, and Malcom.
