= Raymond House =

Raymond House may refer to:

== United States ==
(by state then town)

- Wilbur S. Raymond House, Denver, Colorado, listed on the National Register of Historic Places (NRHP) in northeast Denver
- Raymond-Bradford Homestead, Montville, Connecticut
- Sloan-Raymond-Fitch House, Wilton, Connecticut, listed on the NRHP in Fairfield County
- P.P. Raymond House, Malcom, Iowa, listed on the NRHP in Poweshiek County
- J. E. Raymond House, Girard, Kansas, listed on the NRHP in Crawford County
- Tilley Raymond House, Worcester, Massachusetts
- Raymond House (Vassar College), town of Poughkeepsie, New York, on the campus of Vassar College
- Liberty G. Raymond Tavern and Barn, Kenilworth, Ohio, listed on the NRHP in Trumbull County
- Frank Mason Raymond House, New Franklin, Ohio, listed on the NRHP
- Jessie M. Raymond House, Portland, Oregon, listed on the NRHP in southeast Portland
- Charles and Joseph Raymond Houses, Middletown, Pennsylvania, listed on the NRHP in Dauphin County
- Raymond-Morley House, Austin, Texas, listed on the NRHP in Travis County
- Isaac M. Raymond Farm, Woodstock, Vermont, listed on the NRHP in Windsor County
- Raymond-Ogden Mansion, Seattle, Washington, listed on the NRHP in King County
