= National Register of Historic Places listings in Poweshiek County, Iowa =

Location of Poweshiek County in Iowa

This is a list of the National Register of Historic Places listings in Poweshiek County, Iowa.

This is intended to be a complete list of the properties and districts on the National Register of Historic Places in Poweshiek County, Iowa, United States. Latitude and longitude coordinates are provided for many National Register properties and districts; these locations may be seen together in a map.

There are 25 properties and districts listed on the National Register in the county, including one National Historic Landmark.

This National Park Service list is complete through NPS recent listings posted October 9, 2026.

== Current listings ==
	Name on the Register	Image	Date listed	Location	City or town	Description
1	Bowers and McDonald Office Building	Bowers and McDonald Office Building	December 20, 1990 (#90001849)	816 Commercial St. 41°44′33″N 92°43′29″W	Grinnell	
2	Brooklyn Hotel	Brooklyn Hotel	October 1, 1979 (#79000933)	154 Front St. 41°43′42″N 92°26′51″W	Brooklyn	
3	Brooklyn Opera House–Broadway Theatre	Brooklyn Opera House–Broadway Theatre	May 17, 2021 (#100006522)	115 Jackson St. 41°43′44″N 92°26′42″W	Brooklyn	Footlights in Farm Country: Iowa Opera Houses MPS
4	Chicago, Rock Island and Pacific Railroad-Grinnell Passenger Station	Chicago, Rock Island and Pacific Railroad-Grinnell Passenger Station	December 12, 1976 (#76000805)	Park and State Sts. 41°44′36″N 92°43′20″W	Grinnell	
5	Farmers Mutual Reinsurance Company Building	Farmers Mutual Reinsurance Company Building	March 13, 2013 (#13000069)	821 5th Ave. 41°44′42″N 92°43′29″W	Grinnell	
6	Goodnow Hall	Goodnow Hall	April 26, 1979 (#79000934)	Grinnell College campus 41°44′49″N 92°43′19″W	Grinnell	
7	Grinnell Herald Building	Grinnell Herald Building	January 17, 1991 (#90002131)	813 5th Ave. 41°44′41″N 92°43′29″W	Grinnell	See Grinnell Herald-Register
8	Grinnell Historic Commercial District	Grinnell Historic Commercial District	April 9, 1991 (#91000384)	Roughly bounded by Main, Broad, and Commercial Sts. and 5th Ave. 41°44′37″N 92°43′30″W	Grinnell	
9	Levi P. Grinnell House	Levi P. Grinnell House	October 1, 1979 (#79000935)	1002 Park St. 41°44′42″N 92°43′33″W	Grinnell	
10	Interior Telephone Company Building	Interior Telephone Company Building	December 20, 1990 (#90001850)	815 5th Ave. 41°44′42″N 92°43′29″W	Grinnell	
11	Kent Union Chapel and Cemetery	Kent Union Chapel and Cemetery	September 16, 2009 (#09000715)	3386 V18 Rd. 41°48′22″N 92°26′35″W	Brooklyn	
12	William Manatt House	William Manatt House	October 30, 1997 (#97001288)	304 Jackson St. 41°43′50″N 92°26′44″W	Brooklyn	
13	E.A. and Rebecca (Johnson) Marsh House	E.A. and Rebecca (Johnson) Marsh House	April 15, 1999 (#99000454)	833 East St. 41°44′17″N 92°43′27″W	Grinnell	
14	Mears Hall	Mears Hall	April 26, 1979 (#79000936)	Grinnell College campus 41°44′49″N 92°43′07″W	Grinnell	
15	Merchants' National Bank	Merchants' National Bank	January 7, 1976 (#76000804)	Northwestern corner of 4th Ave. and Broad St. 41°44′39″N 92°43′33″W	Grinnell	
16	Montezuma Downtown Historic District	Montezuma Downtown Historic District	May 30, 2012 (#12000131)	Roughly along 3rd, 4th, Main & Liberty Sts. around courthouse square 41°35′06″N 92°31′27″W	Montezuma	part of the Iowa's Main Street Commercial Architecture Multiple Property Submission
17	New Carroll House Hotel		October 1, 1979 (#79000938)	E. Main and 5th Sts. 41°35′00″N 92°31′21″W	Montezuma	
18	North Grinnell Historic District	North Grinnell Historic District	December 10, 2008 (#08001164)	Park to W. 6th Ave. to 11th Ave. 41°44′59″N 92°43′21″W	Grinnell	
19	Pioneer Oil Company Filling Station	Pioneer Oil Company Filling Station	March 13, 2013 (#13000070)	831 West St. 41°44′32″N 92°43′39″W	Grinnell	
20	Poweshiek County Courthouse	Poweshiek County Courthouse	July 2, 1981 (#81000266)	302 E. Main St. 41°35′07″N 92°31′30″W	Montezuma	
21	P.P. Raymond House	P.P. Raymond House	April 24, 1985 (#85000873)	4th St. 41°42′30″N 92°33′22″W	Malcom	
22	B.J. Ricker House	B.J. Ricker House	December 25, 1979 (#79000937)	1510 Broad St. 41°45′05″N 92°43′33″W	Grinnell	
23	Spaulding Manufacturing Company	Spaulding Manufacturing Company	December 21, 1978 (#78001257)	500-610 4th Ave., 827-829 Spring St. 41°44′36″N 92°43′33″W	Grinnell	
24	Charles H. Spencer House	Charles H. Spencer House	January 25, 1980 (#80001458)	611 6th Ave. 41°44′52″N 92°43′50″W	Grinnell	
25	Stewart Library	Stewart Library	November 21, 1976 (#76000806)	926 Broad St. 41°44′42″N 92°43′24″W	Grinnell	

== Former listings ==
	Name on the Register	Image	Date listed	Date removed	Location	City or town	Description
1	McDowell Bridge	McDowell Bridge	May 15, 1998 (#98000488)	May 10, 2012	River Rd. over the North Skunk River; 41°31′14″N 92°40′32″W	Montezuma	Part of the Highway Bridges of Iowa Multiple Property Submission. Washed out by flooding in July, 2010. Moved to the Auburn Heights Preserve in Yorklyn, Delaware.

== See also ==
- List of National Historic Landmarks in Iowa
- National Register of Historic Places listings in Iowa
- Listings in neighboring counties: Iowa, Jasper, Keokuk, Mahaska, Tama
