= Brooklyn Hotel =

Brooklyn Hotel may refer to:

- Brooklyn Hotel (Brooklyn, Iowa) in the United States
- Brooklyn Hotel, The Rocks in Australia
- Brooklyn-Kahle Saddlery Hotel, San Diego, California, dismantled and reassembled as part of the Horton Grand Hotel
