= Farmers Mutual Reinsurance Company Building =

- U.S. National Register of Historic Places
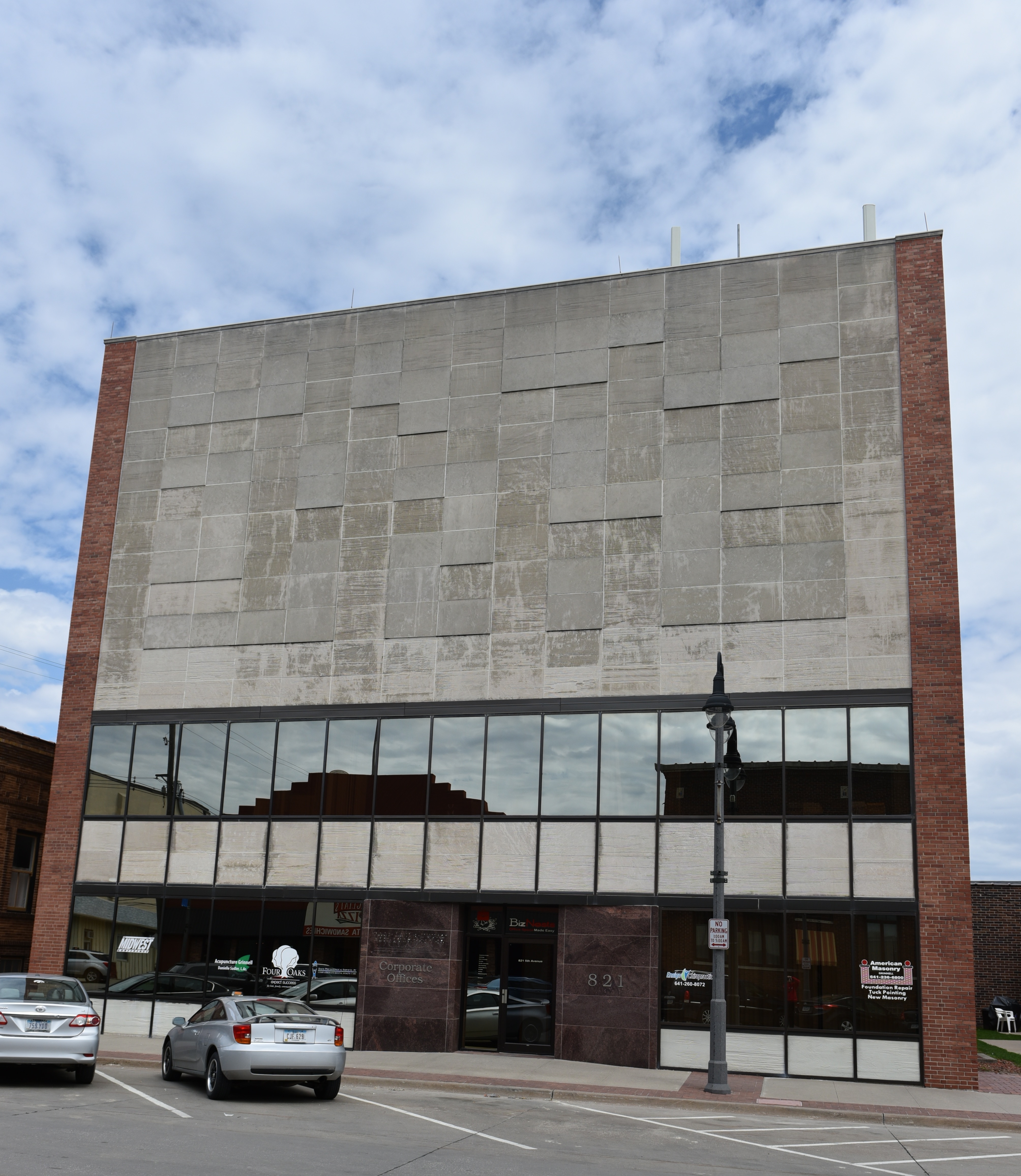

- Location within Iowa Location within the United States
- Location: 821 5th Ave. Grinnell, Iowa
- Coordinates: 41°44′41″N 92°43′29″W
- Area: less than one acre
- Built: 1951, 1957
- Built by: Lovejoy Construction Company
- Architect: Gerald I. Griffith
- Architectural style: Modern Movement
- NRHP reference No.: 13000069
- Added to NRHP: March 13, 2013

The Farmers Mutual Reinsurance Company Building is a historic structure located in Grinnell, Iowa, United States. "The Iowa Farmers Mutual Reinsurance Association was the first statewide organization of its kind in the United States." When it moved to Grinnell from Jefferson, Iowa in 1934 its name was changed to Farmers Mutual Reinsurance Company. It was still a relatively small operation at the time that required only simple rented upstairs quarters. The present building was first occupied in 1951, but only the first two floors were built. The top two floors were completed in 1957, and gave the building its present form. The company rented out the first floor to other commercial businesses. Farmers Mutual Reinsurance Company moved out of building in 1962 to a larger complex south of Grinnell, and at that time became known as the Grinnell Mutual Reinsurance Company. This building was sold to the General Telephone Company, which occupied the whole building until 1968. The Trustees of Iowa (Grinnell) College, GTE Data of Iowa, and DeLong's Sportswear have all subsequently owned the building.

Des Moines architect Gerald I. Griffith was responsible for designing both phases of the Modern Movement structure. Both phases were built by the Lovejoy Construction Company, also of Des Moines. The main facade is composed of gray shot-sawn Indiana limestone panels. The lower two floors feature bands of windows. The upper two floors are all stone veneer that is ornamented with a random patterning of projecting panels that have been sand blasted to a smoother surface, with shot-sawn panels. The building was listed on the National Register of Historic Places in 2013.
