= Performo Toy Company =

American manufacturer of wooden toys

The Performo Toy Company was established in 1925 by Torrence Leroy Dietz, in Middletown, Dauphin County, Pennsylvania. They manufactured wooden toys in a building on North Spring Street. His business expanded rapidly, soon recruiting over 25 employees, and still having trouble filling demands for their popular toys. The corporation documents confirm the president of the toy company was Torrence Dietz and that Rene Grove was the chief designer and one of five partners. The company was capitalize with an initial stock offering of twenty-five thousand dollars. The original partners were Torrence Dietz, president (and salesperson), O.H. Watts, manager and treasurer, Clifford Funk, initially the secretary, and Rene Grove, principal artist and designer, and Elias Klahr, investor. (source financial records)

The company had a catalog of around 40 different toys, all of them distributed by the George Borgfeldt Company, including its most popular doll, a black and white mouse named Micky (US Patent #D70,840, received on August 17, 1926).

Rene Grove's younger brother, Larry Grove worked at the factory. After the mouse was created, Performo had a "Name the Mouse" contest. Larry submitted the name Micky and won the contest.

== Mickey Mouse vs. Micky Mouse debate ==
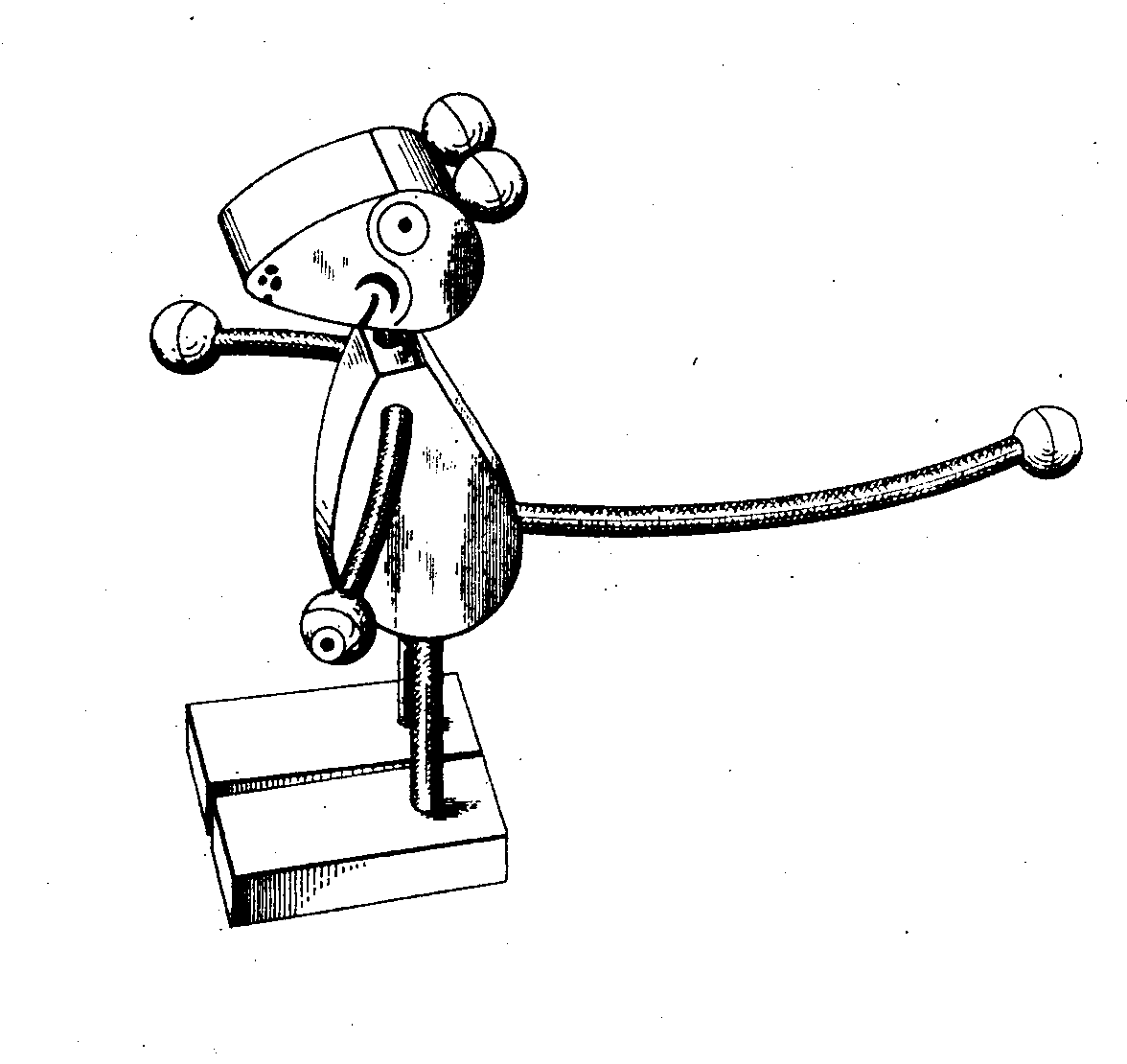
Performo Toy's Micky: August 17, 1926

Mickey Mouse is one of the most loved cartoon characters in the history of animation industry.

The similarities between both mice have led to speculation that Walt Disney stole his most successful idea from the Performo Toy Company. The wooden mouse was popular in New York City (where Performo's distributor was located) in 1928. Coincidentally, at about the same time, Disney thought of the idea for his animation studio's new character and began drafting cartoons, which then aired as shorts, padding the time between one film and the next, and were extremely popular.

There is a well known legend in Middletown about how Performo Toy Company sued The Walt Disney Company, which included some coverage in the local paper. A conspiracy theory might have arisen from this story, however, History Detectives, a television program on PBS, conducted an investigation on the topic. The historians and researchers of the PBS program conducted a nationwide search, finding that there are no records or evidence of any legal action between the two parties. Inquiries to Disney historians and archivists resulted in a letter stating that no such action had ever existed between the companies. Hence the legend is dismissed as local gossip made urban myth.

Part of the program showed that Performo's Micky, while close to Walt Disney's, actually grew more that way after the cartoon's success. Performo's Micky Mouse, without the "e", suddenly developed red shorts with white buttons, as was shown by a Mickey collector who had both products in his multi-room collection. The program's investigating historian concluded that it was a series of generic mice that featured in Felix the Cat (1922), Milton Mouse from Aesop's Film Fables (1920) or Ignatz Mouse from Krazy Kat (1914), which provided the inspiration for Mickey Mouse. When viewed side by side and in sequence of appearance, an evolution of the mice in cartoons of the era is striking, if not conclusive.

Further, in 1932 the sales of Mickey Mouse toy paraphernalia out-grossed the revenues for the films themselves, the first time that happened in the experience of Hollywood. At nearly the same time, Performo came onto hard times despite its rapid growth and filed for bankruptcy in 1933. The PBS historian concludes it became a victim of the depression like multiple other toy companies and other luxury goods producers while the movie tie-in enabled Disney's nascent toys and novelties business to weather the hard times of the Great Depression.

== Bankruptcy ==
In the July 15, 1933 edition of the Press and Journal, the Performo Toy Company announced they were filing for bankruptcy. It is believed that the Great Depression forced them to padlock their doors.

== See also ==
- Mickey Mouse
- The Walt Disney Company
