= Middletown, Dauphin County, Pennsylvania =

Borough in Pennsylvania, US

Middletown, Pennsylvania
- Borough
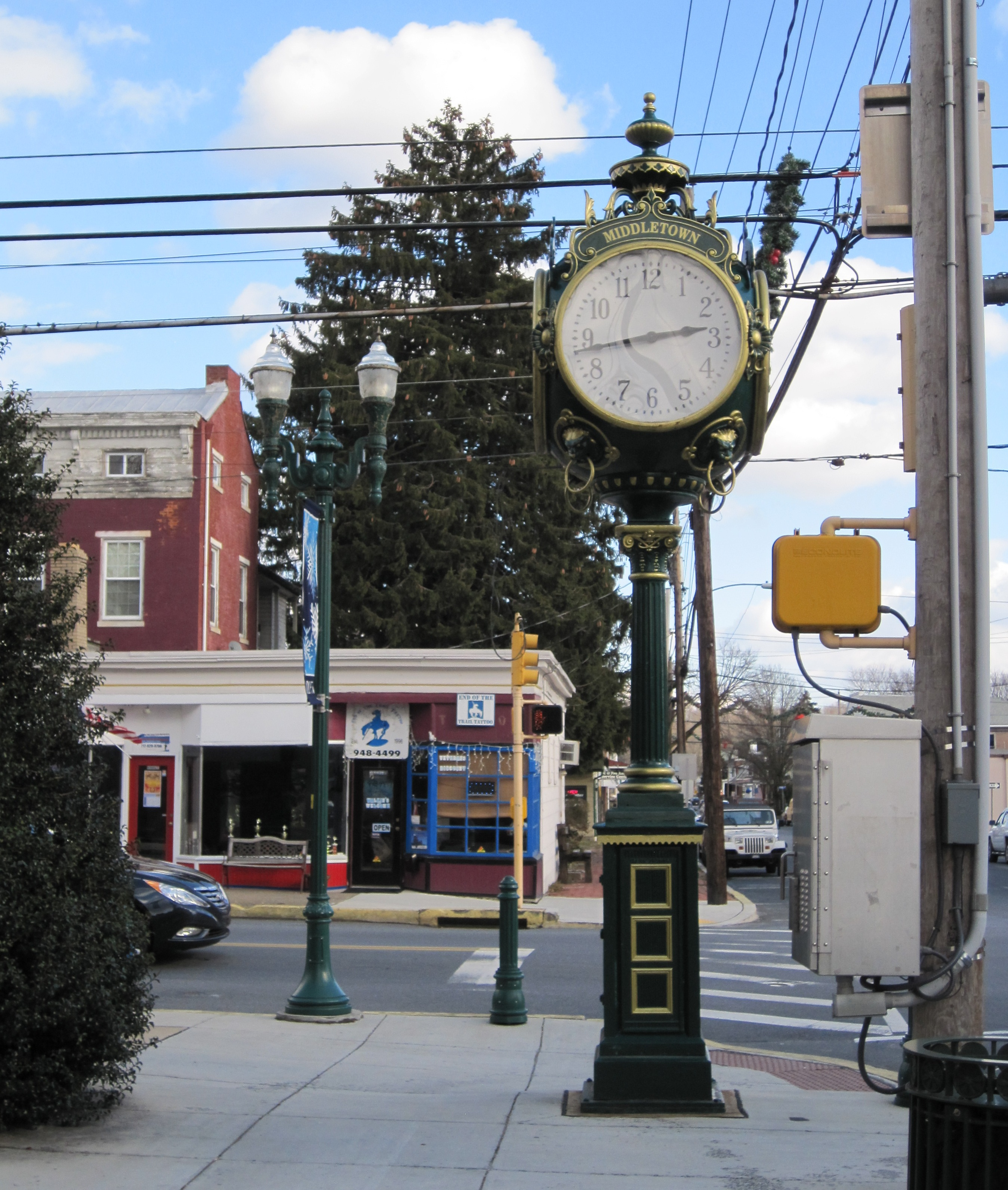
- Union Street in Middletown

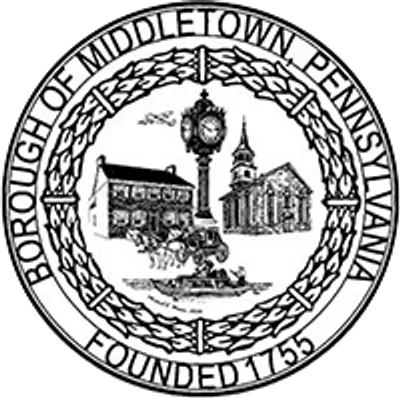
- Seal

- Location of Dauphin County in Pennsylvania (left) and of Middletown in Dauphin County (right)

- Location of Middletown in Pennsylvania and the United States Middletown (the United States)
- Coordinates: 40°11′55″N 76°43′46″W
- Country: United States
- State: Pennsylvania
- County: Dauphin
- Settled: 1755
- Incorporated: 1828

Government
  - Type: Borough Council
  - Manager: Kenneth Klinepeter
  - Borough Council President: Jenny Miller

Area
  - Total: 2.08 sq mi (5.40 km^{2})
  - Land: 2.03 sq mi (5.26 km^{2})
  - Water: 0.054 sq mi (0.14 km^{2})
- Elevation: 360 ft (110 m)

Population (2020)
  - Total: 9,533
  - Density: 4,694.9/sq mi (1,812.72/km^{2})
- Time zone: UTC-5 (Eastern (EST))
  - Summer (DST): UTC-4 (EDT)
- ZIP Code: 17057
- Area code: 717
- FIPS code: 42-49128
- GNIS feature ID: 1215165
- Website: www.middletownborough.com

Pennsylvania Historical Marker
- Designated: April 17, 1952

Middletown is a borough in Dauphin County, Pennsylvania, United States, on the Susquehanna River, 10 miles (16 km) southeast of Harrisburg. As of the 2020 census, it had a population of 9,550. It is part of the Harrisburg metropolitan area.

== History ==
=== 18th century ===
Middletown was founded in 1755 along the left bank of the Susquehanna River and was incorporated as a borough in 1828 after a sudden boom in development and population occurred as a result of the construction of the Union Canal, connecting Lancaster to Middletown. In 1824, Pennsylvania's state legislature authorized and funded the canal construction as part of the broad sweeping commercial initiative called the Main Line of Public Works; a forward looking project designing to connect Philadelphia to Pittsburgh by canals and river navigations and Philadelphia to challenge New York City and the Erie Canal for emerging mid-western markets beyond the Allegheny Mountains.

Middletown was selected as the western terminus of the Union Canal, and it was named from its location halfway between Lancaster and Carlisle, where an ascent exists to a low pass allowing easier wagon-era travel among the barrier mountains of the Ridge-and-valley Appalachians giving access into north-central Maryland and the valley of the Potomac River. (Note: This important transportation corridor is still in use today for Interstate 81 through Chambersburg and Hagerstown, Maryland. Carlisle was also one of the jump-off points to climb the eastern ascents to the gaps of the Allegheny, which were the only ways animal powered transport technology could easily cross the Allegheny Front barrier ridge up onto and over the Appalachian Plateau to Western Pennsylvania and Ohio.) It is the oldest incorporated community in Dauphin County and is located within a rich agricultural area forming the western edge of Pennsylvania Dutch Country.

=== 19th century ===
The George Everhart (Frey) Trust, named for a citizen of Middletown from the 1800s, still manages leases on much of the land in and around Middletown. The trust was founded to operate the Frey Orphanage and did so for many years, in three locations in Middletown. The orphanage eventually closed, and the final location, on Red Hill, has become the Frey Village Retirement Community, a Diakon Lutheran senior living facility.

=== 20th century ===
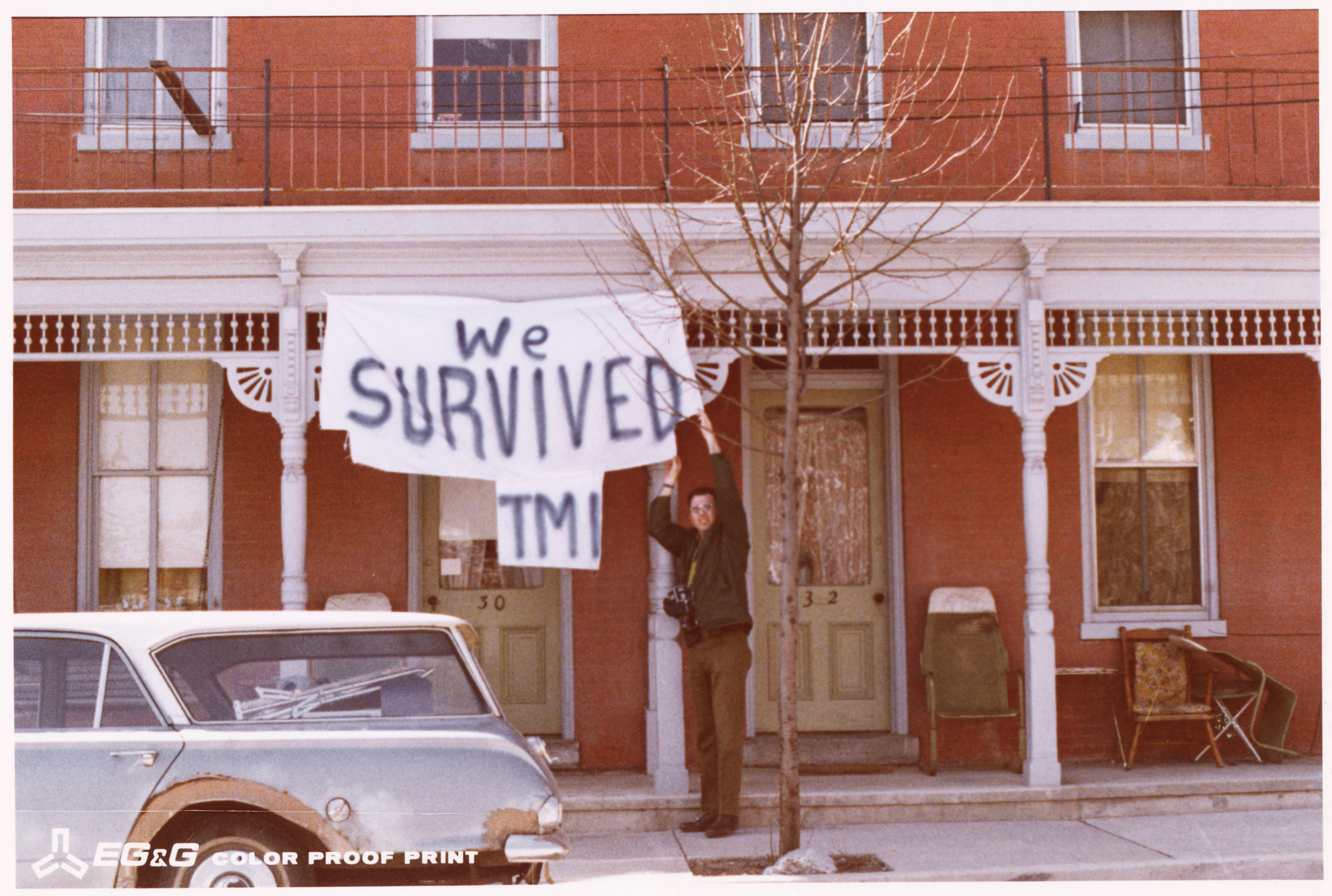
Photo from 1979

Middletown is located 3 miles (5 km) north of the Three Mile Island Nuclear Power Plant. The Unit #2 reactor at the Three Mile Island Nuclear Power Plant suffered a partial meltdown in 1979, causing then Pennsylvania governor Dick Thornburgh to order the evacuation of pregnant women and pre-school children from the area. Within days, 140,000 people had left the area. President Jimmy Carter visited Middletown's Community Building to calm the nerves of anxious residents.

Because the town is old, diverse historic architectural styles abound. Middletown has everything from log houses, some whose construction is obscured by modern siding, to Victorian mansions, and beyond. The Simon Cameron House and Bank, B'nai Jacob Synagogue, St. Peter's Kierch, Charles and Joseph Raymond Houses, Henry Smith Farm, and Swatara Ferry House are listed on the National Register of Historic Places.

== Geography ==
Middletown is located in southern Dauphin County at 40°11′55″N 76°43′46″W (40.198491, -76.729326). Its southern border is along the Susquehanna River, and its eastern border is formed by Swatara Creek, across which is the borough of Royalton. Pennsylvania Route 230 (Main Street) leads northwest 10 miles (16 km) to the center of Harrisburg and southeast 8 miles (13 km) to Elizabethtown. Via the PA 283 expressway it is 28 miles (45 km) southeast to Lancaster. The Pennsylvania Turnpike (Interstate 76) passes through the northern part of the borough, but the nearest access is 4 miles (6 km) west near Highspire. The town has Amtrak Keystone Service at Middletown station.

According to the U.S. Census Bureau, the borough has a total area of 2.1 square miles (5.4 km^{2}), of which 2.0 square miles (5.3 km^{2}) is land and 0.04 square miles (0.1 km^{2}), or 2.33%, is water.

== Demographics ==
Historical population
Census	Pop.	Note	%±
1820	567		—
1830	302		−46.7%
1850	900		—
1860	2,392		165.8%
1870	2,980		24.6%
1880	3,351		12.4%
1890	5,080		51.6%
1900	5,608		10.4%
1910	5,374		−4.2%
1920	5,920		10.2%
1930	6,085		2.8%
1940	7,046		15.8%
1950	9,184		30.3%
1960	11,182		21.8%
1970	9,080		−18.8%
1980	10,122		11.5%
1990	9,254		−8.6%
2000	9,242		−0.1%
2010	8,901		−3.7%
2020	9,533		7.1%
2021 (est.)	9,587		0.6%

As of the census of 2000, there were 9,242 people, 4,032 households, and 2,370 families residing in the borough. The population density was 4,536.5 inhabitants per square mile (1,751.6/km^{2}). There were 4,387 housing units at an average density of 2,153.4 per square mile (831.4/km^{2}). The racial makeup of the borough was 88.77% White, 7.34% African American, 0.27% Native American, 0.53% Asian, 0.04% Pacific Islander, 0.92% from other races, and 2.13% from two or more races. Hispanic or Latino of any race were 3.18% of the population.

There were 4,032 households, out of which 28.2% had children under the age of 18 living with them, 40.8% were married couples living together, 13.9% had a female householder with no husband present, and 41.2% were non-families. 35.2% of all households were made up of individuals, and 14.2% had someone living alone who was 65 years of age or older. The average household size was 2.23 and the average family size was 2.90.

In the borough the population was spread out, with 23.0% under the age of 18, 8.5% from 18 to 24, 30.1% from 25 to 44, 21.1% from 45 to 64, and 17.3% who were 65 years of age or older. The median age was 37 years. For every 100 females, there were 84.9 males. For every 100 females age 18 and over, there were 80.5 males.

The median income for a household in the borough was $35,425, and the median income for a family was $43,661. Males had a median income of $32,891 versus $24,692 for females. The per capita income for the borough was $18,535. About 4.6% of families and 6.6% of the population were below the poverty line, including 6.6% of those under age 18 and 5.6% of those age 65 or over.

== Education ==
- Middletown Area School District
- Penn State Harrisburg

== Arts and Culture ==
- Performo Toy Company

=== Annual cultural events ===
- The Middletown Area Historical Society Annual Arts and Craft Fair. Located in Hoffer Park the first Saturday in June.
- Trick or Treat – the Thursday closest (before) Halloween is the night used for the annual Trick or Treat. Houses with their porchlight on from 6 pm until 8 pm are houses participating.

=== Museums and other points of interest ===
The Middletown Area Historical Society is both a museum and visitor center located at 29 East Main Street.

Indian Echo Caverns, located 5 miles north of the borough limits, is one of the main attractions near Middletown. The caverns were originally used by the Susquehannock tribe, who lived and hunted in the nearby area until their population and authority was quickly decimated by the spread of infectious disease in the late 1670s, leading to their absorption by neighboring tribes. It opened to the public in 1929.

The shortline Middletown and Hummelstown Railroad operates heritage and freight service between its namesake towns of Middletown and just south of Hummelstown proper, stopping in front of the Indian Echo Caverns entrance.

=== In the town ===
In the town there is an American Legion, a borough office building, and a post office. The legion (located at the intersection of High and Spruce Streets) and the post office is located on Main Street. The borough office building is located on West Emaus Street. The town also has several churches.

The Middletown Volunteer Fire Department occasionally serves as a distribution center for Potassium Iodide pills supplied by the Pennsylvania Department of Health. Middletown falls within a 10-mile radius of Three Mile Island.

=== Sports ===
The Central Pennsylvania Kings are a team in the American Basketball Association (ABA) that have played at Main Street Gym since 2019.
