= Henry Smith Farm =

Historic house in Pennsylvania, United States

- U.S. National Register of Historic Places
- U.S. Historic district
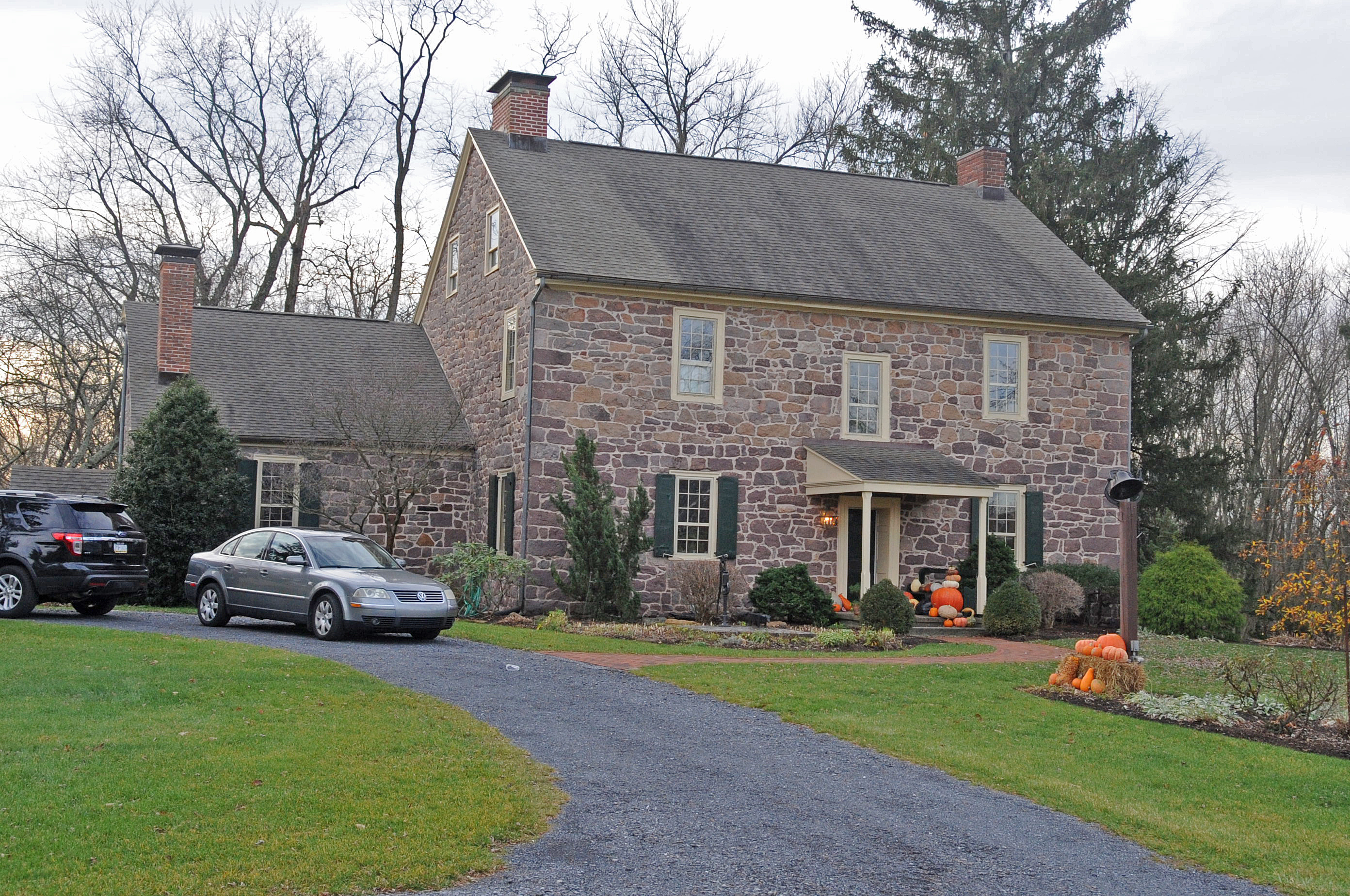
- House

- Location within Pennsylvania Location within the United States
- Location: 950 Swatara Creek Rd., Middletown, Pennsylvania
- Coordinates: 40°12′46″N 76°42′56″W
- Area: 1 acre (0.40 ha)
- Built: 1806, 1840, 1845-1847
- Architectural style: Federal, Georgian
- NRHP reference No.: 88003050
- Added to NRHP: December 22, 1988

The Henry Smith Farm, also known as Hidden Spring Farm, is an historic home, barn, and vaulted cellar which are located in Middletown, Dauphin County, Pennsylvania, United States.

It was added to the National Register of Historic Places in 1988.

== History and architectural features ==
The house was built in 1806 as a two-story, five-bay, double-pile, brownstone building, and was designed in the Federal style. The interior has a center hall plan, which was created in the Georgian style. A two-story kitchen addition was built in 1840. The brownstone bank barn was built between 1845 and 1847. A vaulted cellar that was built of rubble stone is located near the house.

It was added to the National Register of Historic Places in 1988.
