= Kent Union Chapel and Cemetery =

Historic site in Brooklyn, Iowa, US

- U.S. National Register of Historic Places
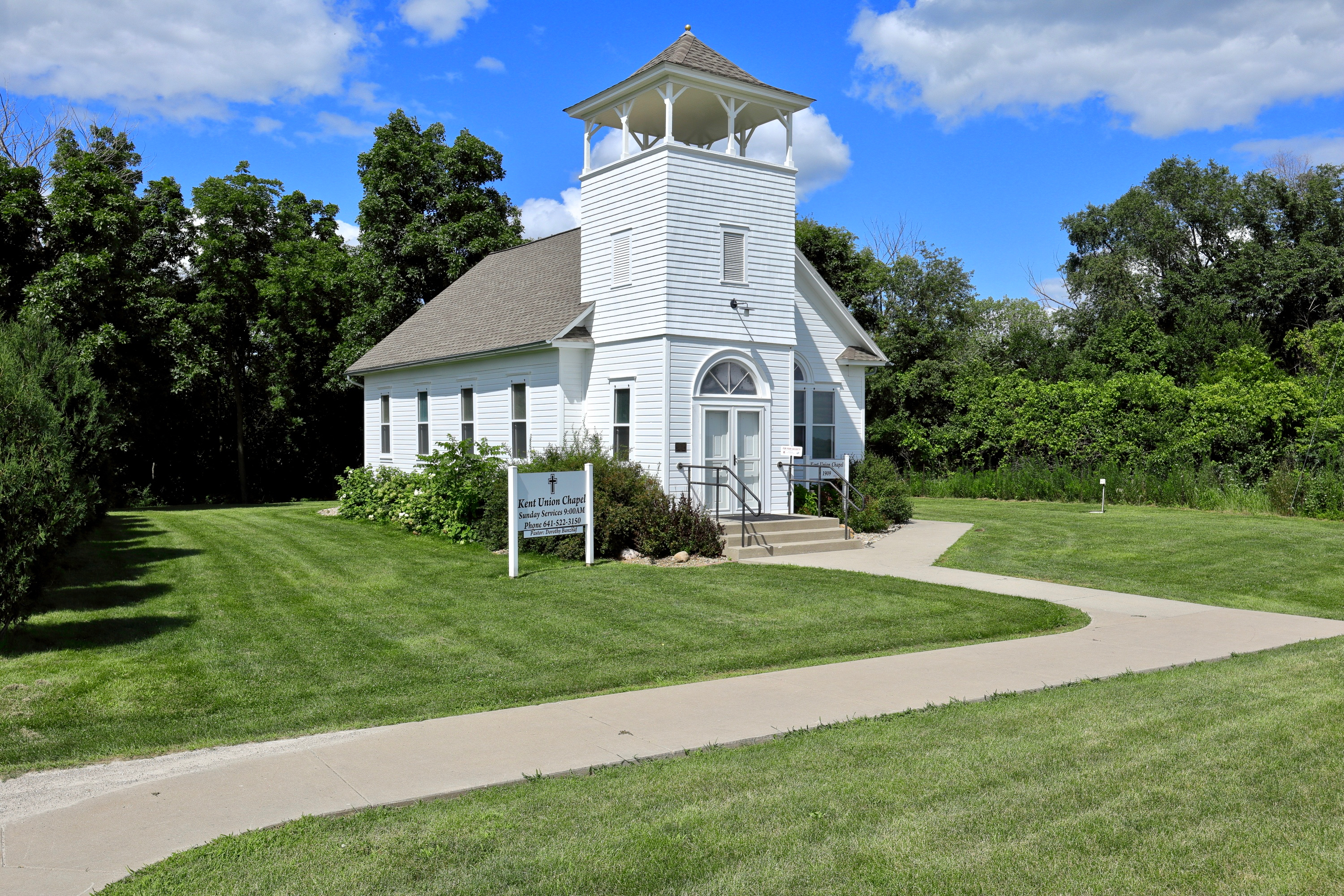

- Location within Iowa Location within the United States
- Location: 3386 V18 Rd. Brooklyn, Iowa
- Coordinates: 41°48′22″N 92°26′35″W
- Area: less than one acre
- Built: 1909
- Built by: John Byers
- Architectural style: Classical Revival
- NRHP reference No.: 09000715
- Added to NRHP: September 16, 2009

Kent Union Chapel and Cemetery is a historic building and cemetery located north of Brooklyn, Iowa, United States. They are named for the Kent family who moved to Poweshiek County from Putnam County, Indiana in 1853. They acquired property near Joseph Enochs who had arrived a year earlier. He and his wife Betsey donated a parcel of land for the cemetery in 1858. Moses Kent Sr. took possession of the land around the cemetery the following year and the area became identified with the Kent family after that. By 1870 a school was built next to the cemetery, and both took the Kent name. The schoolhouse was also a community center where a variety of local functions were held, including church services and Sunday school classes. Because of a reorganization of the county's public schools, it was relocated a mile to the northeast in 1907. The following year the Kent Cemetery Aid Society was established by area women. They were Protestants, Catholics, and some claimed no religious affiliation. They decided to replace the schoolhouse with a union chapel. They signed a 50-year lease for the land and held a variety of fundraisers to raise the money to build the chapel. Many Brooklyn businesses donated materials for the project. It was dedicated on May 23, 1909. The chapel and cemetery was listed on the National Register of Historic Places in 2009.

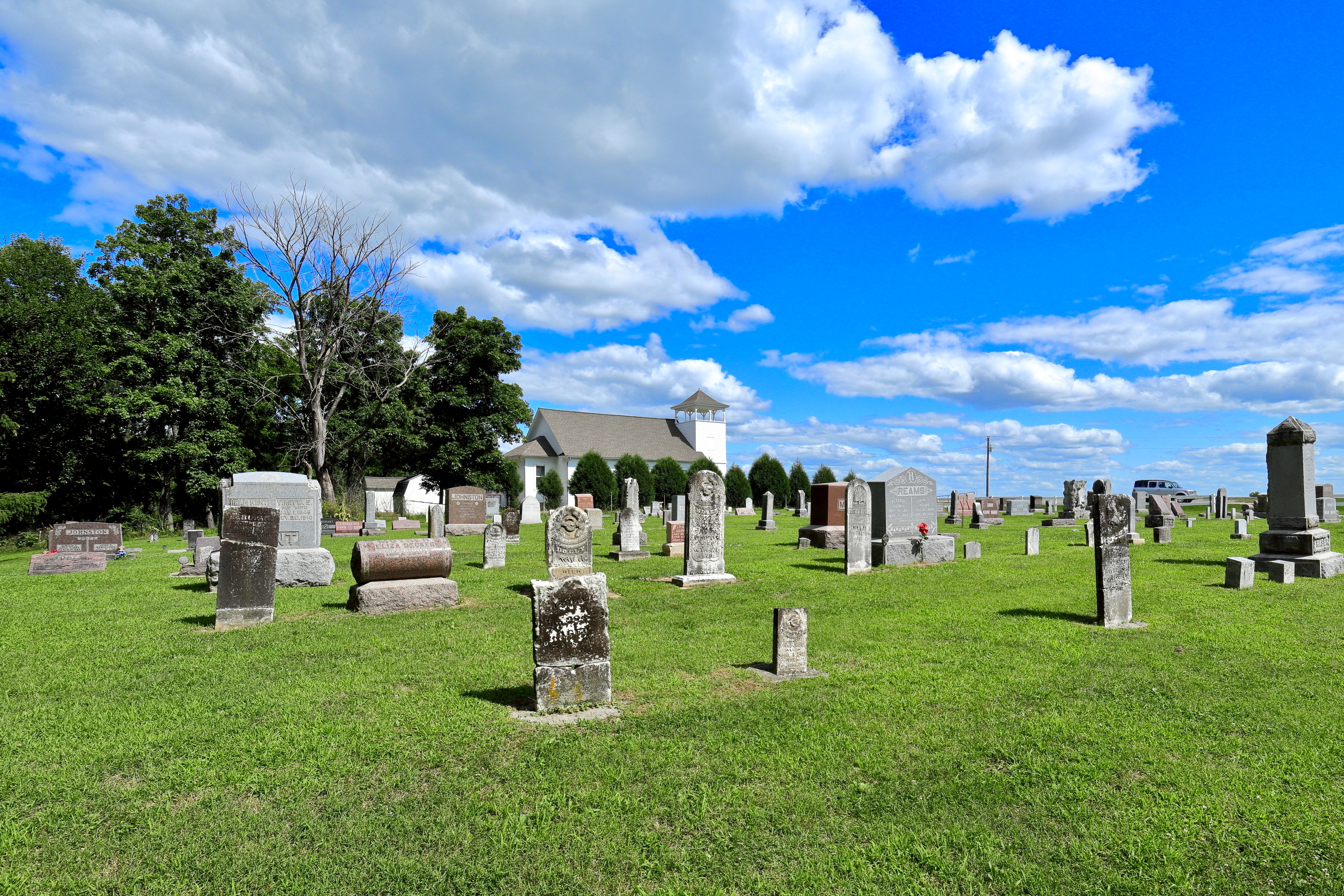
Kent Cemetery

== See also ==
- National Register of Historic Places in Poweshiek County, Iowa
