= Simon Cameron House and Bank =

Historic house in Pennsylvania, United States

- U.S. National Register of Historic Places
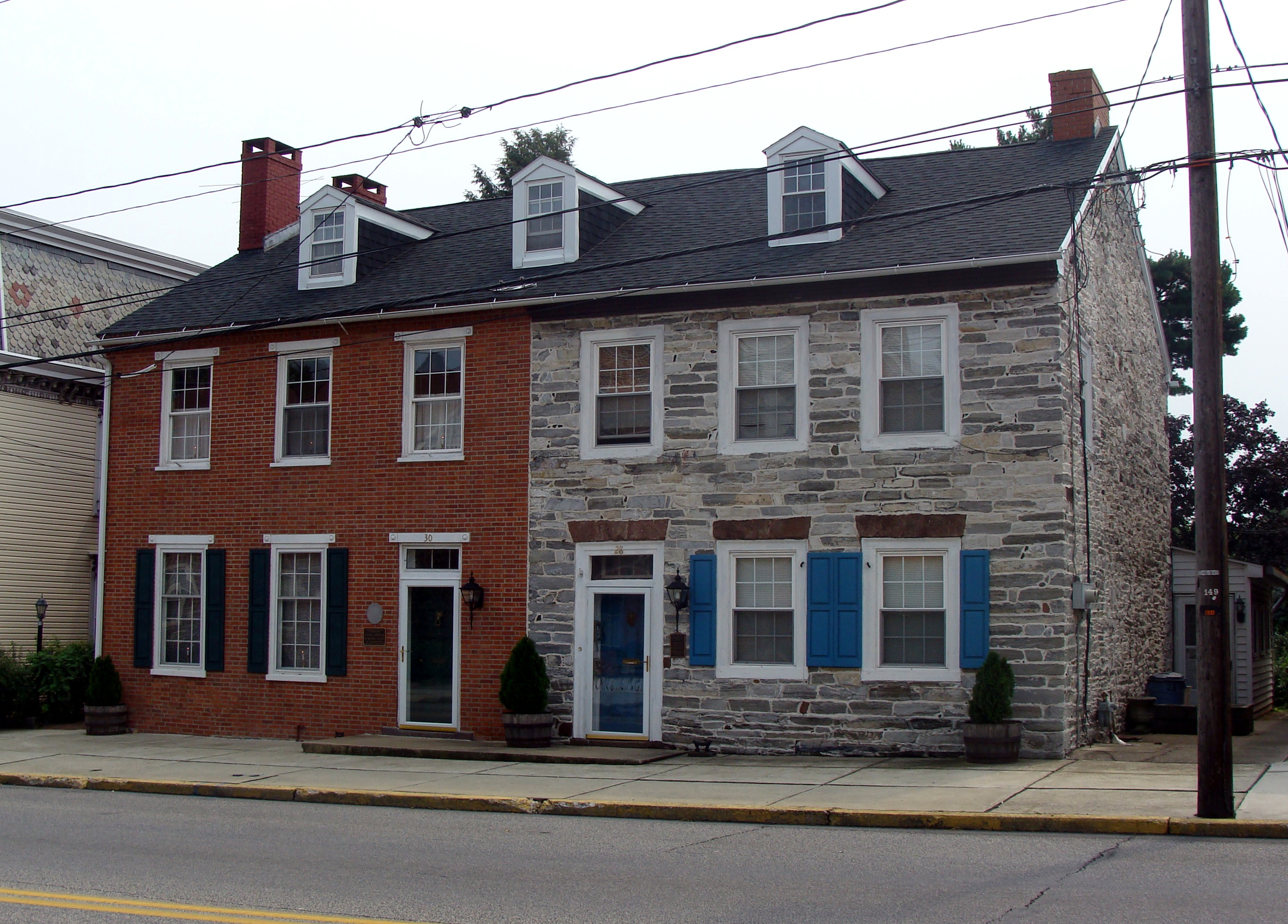
- Simon Cameron House and Bank, September 2011

- Location within Pennsylvania Location within the United States
- Location: 28 and 30 E. Main St., Middletown, Pennsylvania
- Coordinates: 40°11′59″N 76°43′51″W
- Area: 0.8 acres (0.32 ha)
- Built: 1833
- NRHP reference No.: 76001634
- Added to NRHP: November 21, 1976

The Simon Cameron House and Bank consists of an historic home and bank building that are located in Middletown, Dauphin County, Pennsylvania, United States.

It was added to the National Register of Historic Places in 1976.

== History and architectural features ==
This historic house was built circa 1833, and is a 2 1/2-story, three-bay, brick building with a typical half-Georgian plan. Attached to the house is a 2 1/2-story, three-bay, stone building, also with a typical half-Georgian plan. The stone structure originally housed the Cameron Bank, which was chartered in 1832.

The house was the primary residence for the family of Simon Cameron (1799-1889) from 1832 to 1855. Simon Cameron's son J. Donald Cameron (1833-1918) was born in the house.
