= William Manatt House =

Historic house in Brooklyn, Iowa, US

- U.S. National Register of Historic Places
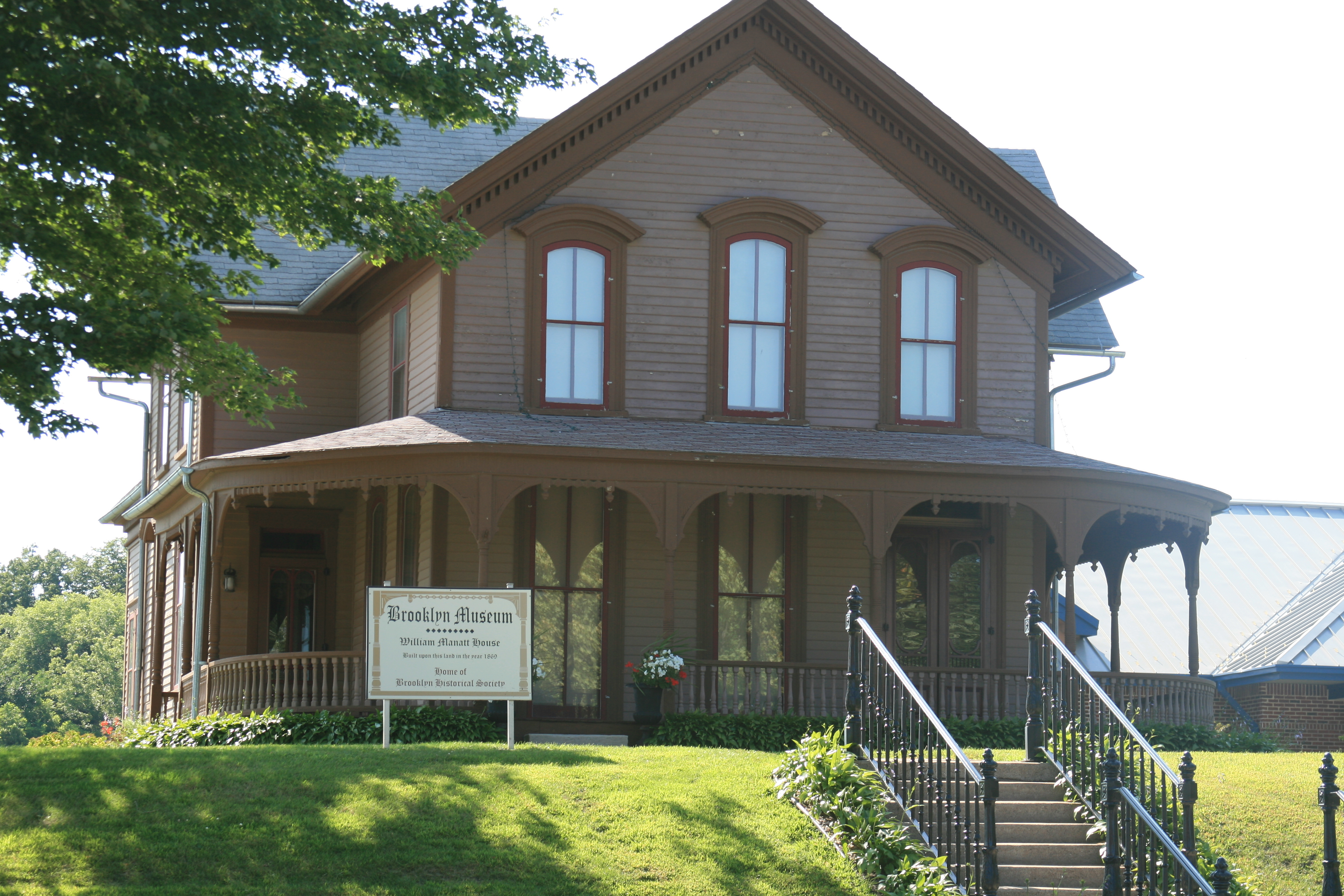

- Location within Iowa Location within the United States
- Location: 304 Jackson St. Brooklyn, Iowa
- Coordinates: 41°43′52″N 92°26′45″W
- Area: less than one acre
- Built: 1869
- Built by: William Manatt
- Architectural style: Italianate; Queen Anne
- NRHP reference No.: 97001288
- Added to NRHP: October 30, 1997

The William Manatt House, also known as the Brooklyn Historical Museum, is a historic dwelling located in Brooklyn, Iowa, United States. It is associated with the settlement of the town. Manatt and his father Robert moved from Holmes County, Ohio and settled in Poweshiek County in 1848. The farmstead they developed eventually became the city of Brooklyn. His father laid out most of the town in 1855. William sold property to the Mississippi and Missouri Railroad for a $1, and it reached Brooklyn in 1862. He granted land to the Chicago, Rock Island and Pacific Railroad in 1869. Manatt owned several businesses in town, which were run by various family members, and he owned an estate that grew to 1,500 acres (610 ha) of land. He had this house built in 1869 on property that included a large barn, carriage house and pasture land. Manatt died in the house in 1906. His widow Roxann and two of his daughters, Thursia and Nellie, lived here until they died or moved out late in life. His youngest son Coe bought the house in the mid-1950s when Nellie moved out, and donated it to the city of Brooklyn before he died in 1962. It housed the Brooklyn Public Library until the Spring of 1999, and since then the Brooklyn Historical Museum. The two-story frame structure features Italianate elements, especially the tall, segmentally arched windows and hooded crowns. Dental molding is found on the cornice. The porch that encircles half of the house is not original. The house was listed on the National Register of Historic Places in 1997.

== See also ==
- National Register of Historic Places in Poweshiek County, Iowa
