= Montezuma Downtown Historic District =

Historic district in Iowa, United States

- U.S. National Register of Historic Places
- U.S. Historic district
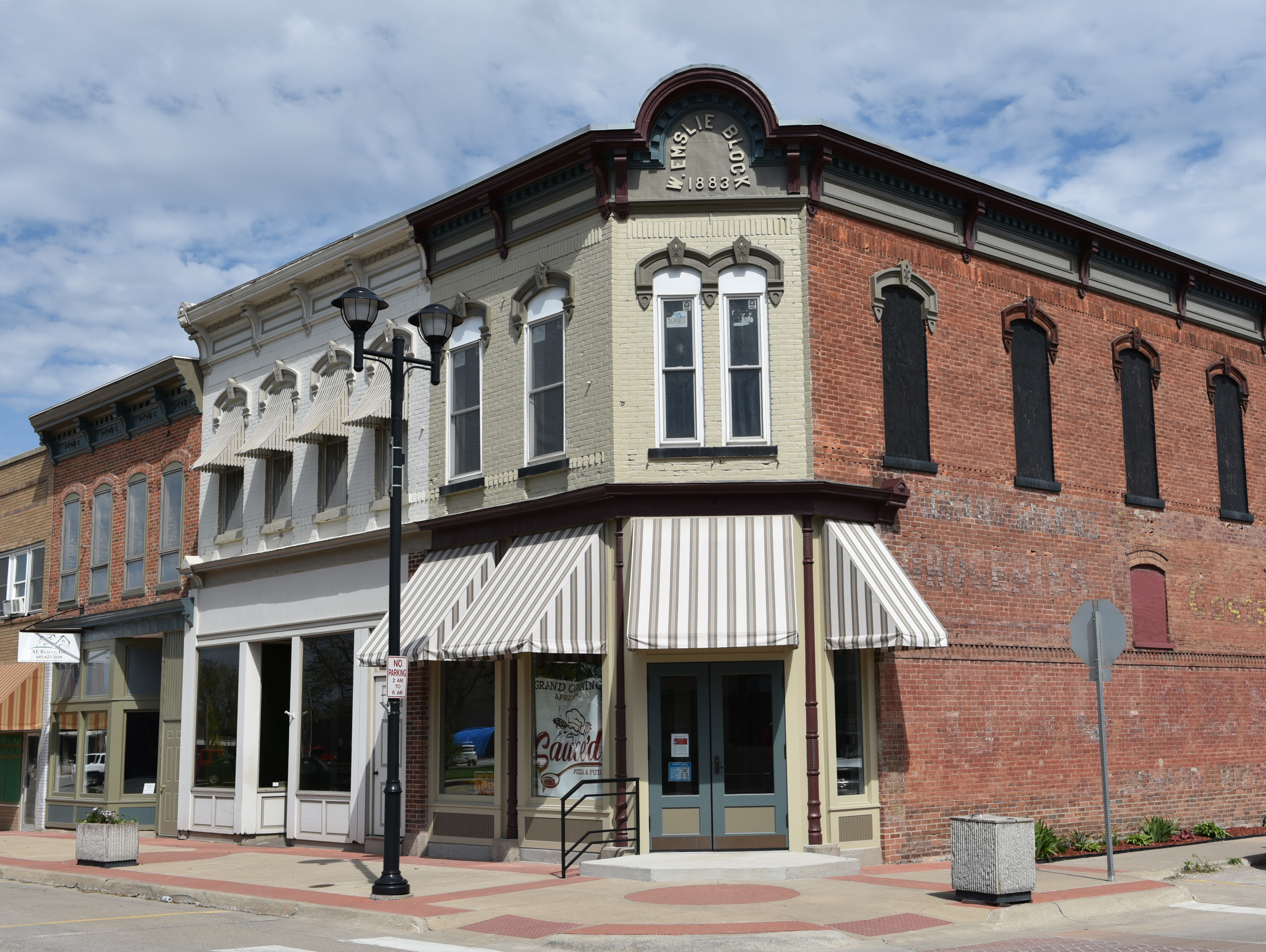
- The W. Emslie Block

- Location within Iowa Location within the United States
- Location: Roughly along 3rd, 4th, Main & Liberty Sts. around courthouse square, Montezuma, Iowa
- Coordinates: 41°35′05″N 92°31′27″W
- Architectural style: Late Victorian; Late 19th and 20th Century Revivals
- NRHP reference No.: 12000131
- Added to NRHP: May 30, 2012

The Montezuma Downtown Historic District is a nationally recognized historic district located in Montezuma, Iowa, United States. It was listed on the National Register of Historic Places in 2012. The historic district covers Montezuma's central business district, and includes the Poweshiek County Courthouse, Carter Hotel, and the Carnegie Library building. Iowa architect Frank E. Wetherell has at least one building.

== See also ==
- National Register of Historic Places in Poweshiek County, Iowa
