= Swatara Ferry House =

Historic house in Pennsylvania, United States

- U.S. National Register of Historic Places
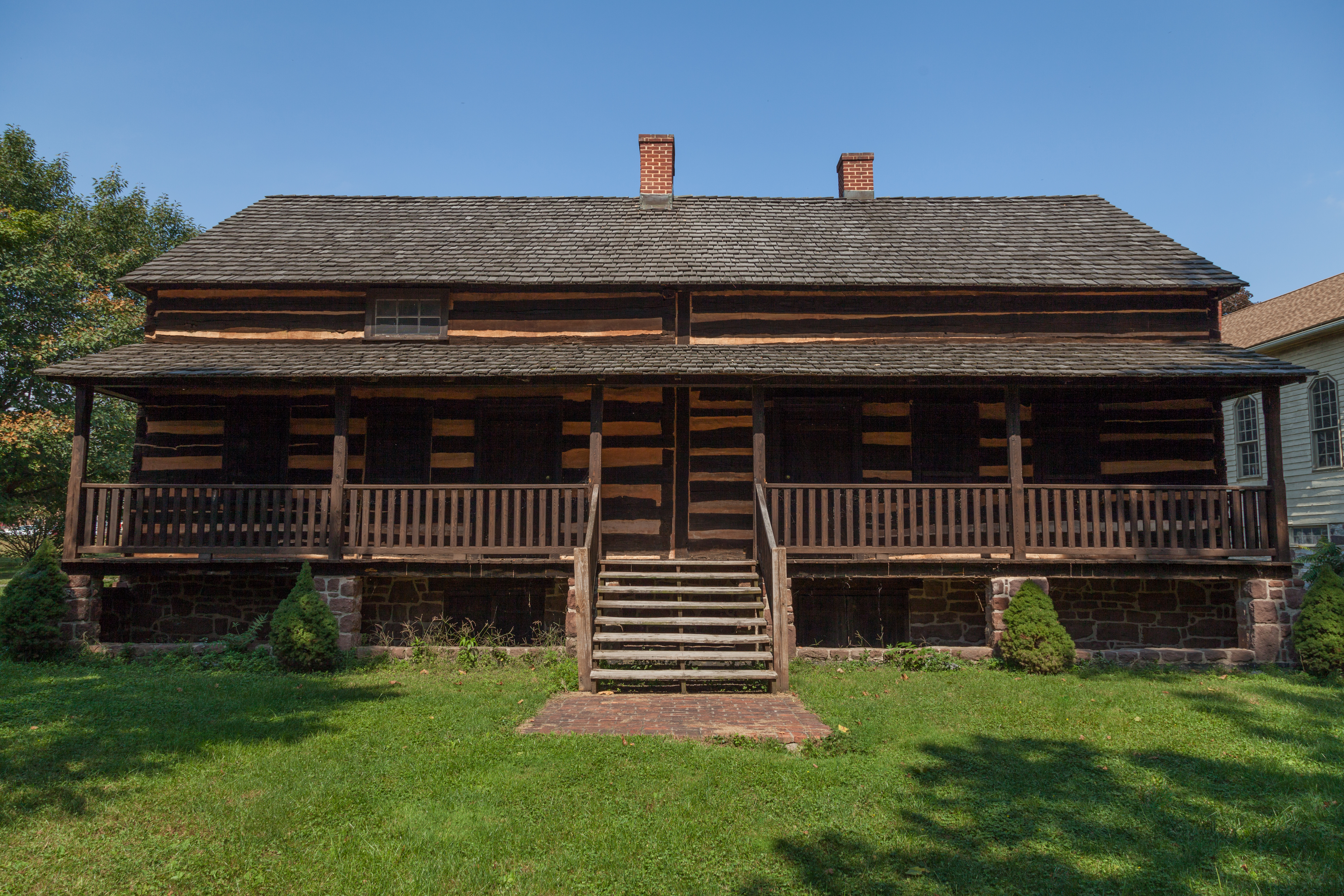

- Location within Pennsylvania Location within the United States
- Location: 400 Swatara St., Middletown, Pennsylvania
- Coordinates: 40°11′29″N 76°43′57″W
- Area: 0.5 acres (0.20 ha)
- Built: c. 1820
- Architectural style: German Plan
- NRHP reference No.: 76001635
- Added to NRHP: September 27, 1976

Swatara Ferry House, also known as "Old Fort," is a historic home located at Middletown, Dauphin County, Pennsylvania, United States. It is a 1 1/2-story log building with a full stone foundation and cellar, built in two sections. It is believed to date to about 1820.

It was added to the National Register of Historic Places in 1976.
