= New Carroll House Hotel =

Historic hotel in Montezuma, Iowa, US

- U.S. National Register of Historic Places
- U.S. Historic district – Contributing property
- Location within Iowa Location within the United States
- Location: E. Main and 5th Sts. Montezuma, Iowa
- Coordinates: 41°35′06″N 92°31′21″W
- Built: 1892
- Built by: J.C. Forcum
- Part of: Montezuma Downtown Historic District (ID12000131)
- NRHP reference No.: 79000938
- Added to NRHP: October 1, 1979

The New Carroll House Hotel, also known as the Carter Hotel, is a historic building located in Montezuma, Iowa, United States. There has been a hotel on this corner since 1856. It was owned by a succession of people until Thomas Carroll became the proprietor and renamed it the Carroll House in 1880. It was destroyed in a fire in 1891. J.C. Forcum, a local builder, completed the New Carroll House for $18,000 in 1892. It is a three-story brick structure on a corner lot, which was emphasized by its veranda and irregular corner treatment. The hotel was individually listed on the National Register of Historic Places in 1979. In 2012 it was listed as a contributing property in the Montezuma Downtown Historic District.

== See also ==
- National Register of Historic Places in Poweshiek County, Iowa
