= Levi P. Grinnell House =

Historic house in Iowa, United States

- U.S. National Register of Historic Places
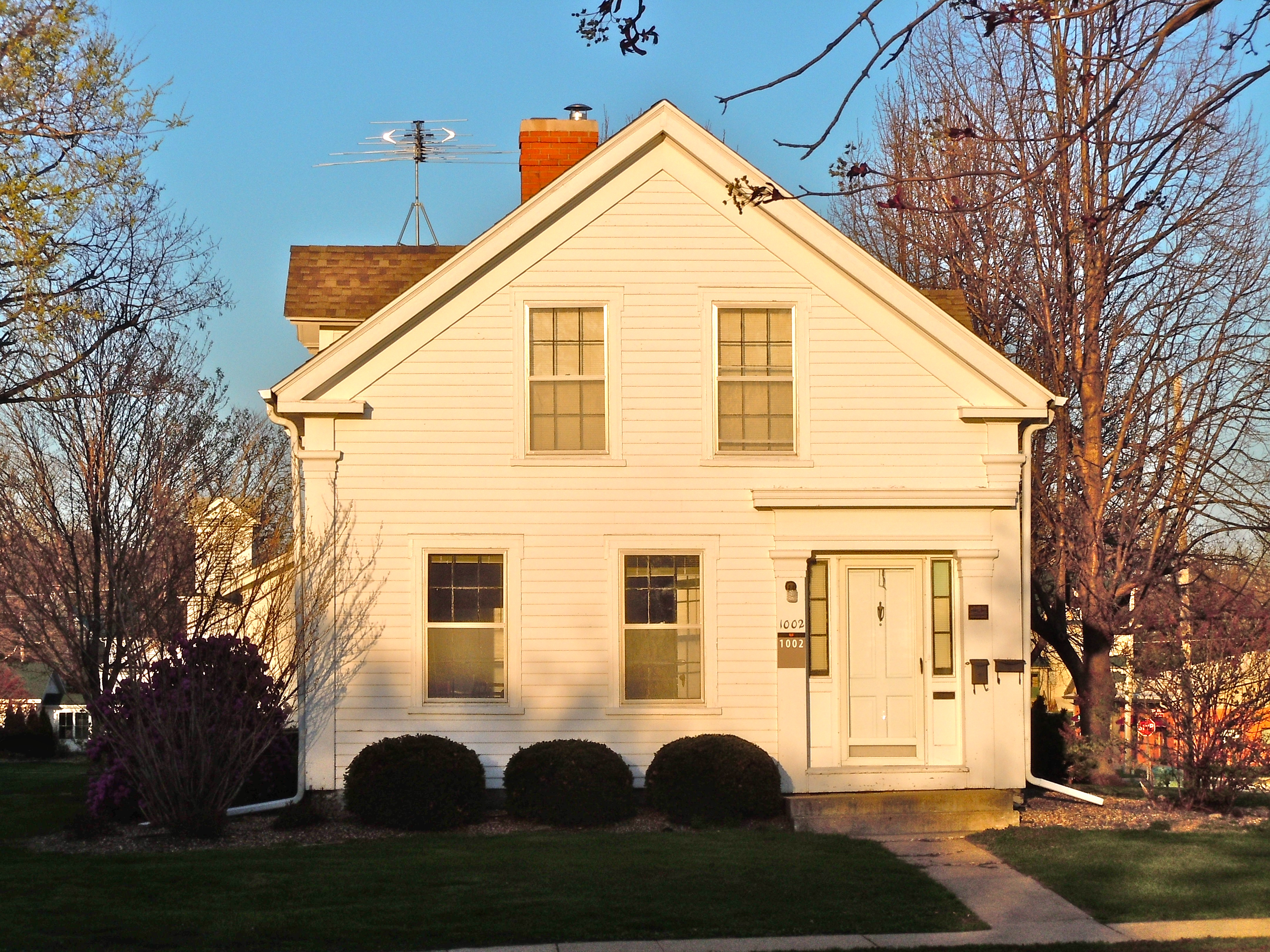

- Location within Iowa Location within the United States
- Location: 1002 Park St. Grinnell, Iowa
- Coordinates: 41°44′41″N 92°43′20″W
- Area: less than one acre
- Built: 1860
- Architectural style: Greek Revival
- NRHP reference No.: 79000935
- Added to NRHP: October 1, 1979

The Levi P. Grinnell House is a historic dwelling located in Grinnell, Iowa, United States. Levi Grinnell came from Vermont to settle in Poweshiek County in the 1850s. He was a cousin of Josiah Bushnell Grinnell, a political and social activist who founded the town and Grinnell College. Levi Grinnell owned this property from 1857 to 1863, and had the house built about 1860. After he left here he farmed outside of town. The 1½-story frame structure is characteristic of vernacular Greek Revival domestic architecture found in the small towns and the rural areas of the upper Midwest. The house was listed on the National Register of Historic Places in 1979.
