= Bowers and McDonald Office Building =

- U.S. National Register of Historic Places
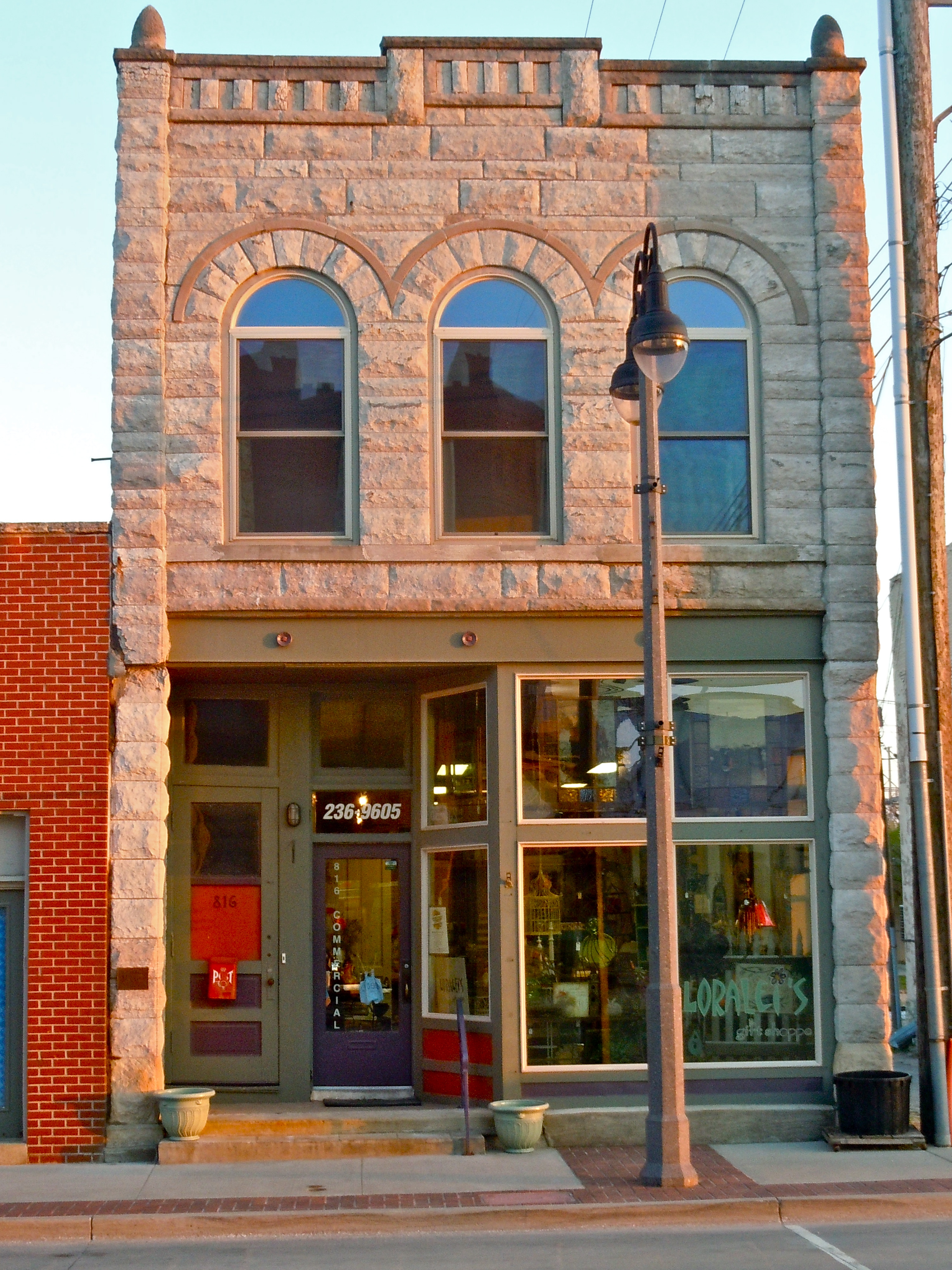

- Location within Iowa Location within the United States
- Location: 816 Commercial St. Grinnell, Iowa
- Coordinates: 41°44′32″N 92°43′29″W
- Area: less than one acre
- Built: 1896
- Built by: R.G. Coutts
- Architectural style: Romanesque Revival
- MPS: Grinnell MPS
- NRHP reference No.: 90001849
- Added to NRHP: April 9, 1991

The Bowers and McDonald Office Building is a historic structure located in Grinnell, Iowa, United States. J.B. Bowers and M.W. McDonald had the building built as a speculative real-estate venture.

Located in the city's central business district, it was one of the buildings constructed after a fire leveled a portion of the district in 1889.

Its construction is attributed to R.G. Coutts, a native of Scotland who settled in Grinnell in 1873. He was a stone cutter, mason, building contractor, and real-estate developer.

The two-story, brick structure has a main facade of stone veneer, and features Richardsonian Romanesque styling. It was listed on the National Register of Historic Places in 1991.
