= Grinnell Herald Building =

- U.S. National Register of Historic Places
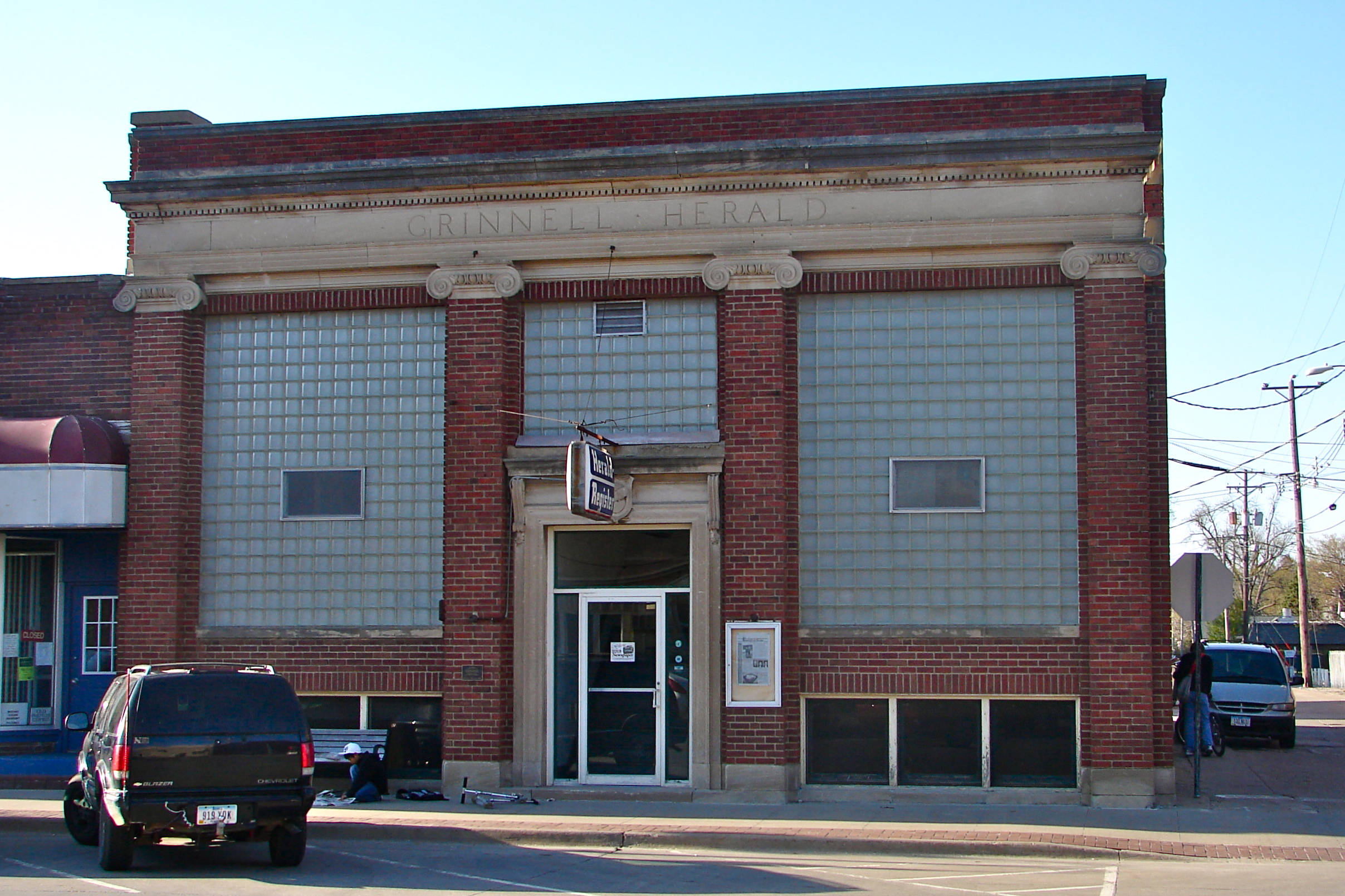

- Location within Iowa Location within the United States
- Location: 813 5th Ave. Grinnell, Iowa
- Coordinates: 41°44′41″N 92°43′30″W
- Area: less than one acre
- Built: 1916
- Architect: Proudfoot, Bird & Rawson
- Architectural style: Classical Revival
- MPS: Grinnell MPS
- NRHP reference No.: 90002131
- Added to NRHP: January 17, 1991

The Grinnell Herald Building is a historic structure located in Grinnell, Iowa, United States. The Herald was established in 1869 with the Rev. J. M. Hillyer as the first editor. Lowrie Frisbie began his 50-year tenure as its editor in the early 20th-century. In its early years the newspaper was housed in numerous buildings in the city's central business district. Its owners put up this Neoclassical brick building in 1916. It was designed by the prominent Des Moines architectural firm of Proudfoot, Bird & Rawson. The same year the Herald's competitor, the Grinnell Register, erected their own building. The two newspapers merged in 1936 to form the Grinnell Herald-Register. They choose this building to house their operations, and it continues to do so. It was listed on the National Register of Historic Places in 1991.
