= Tilley Raymond House =

Historic house in Massachusetts, United States

- U.S. National Register of Historic Places
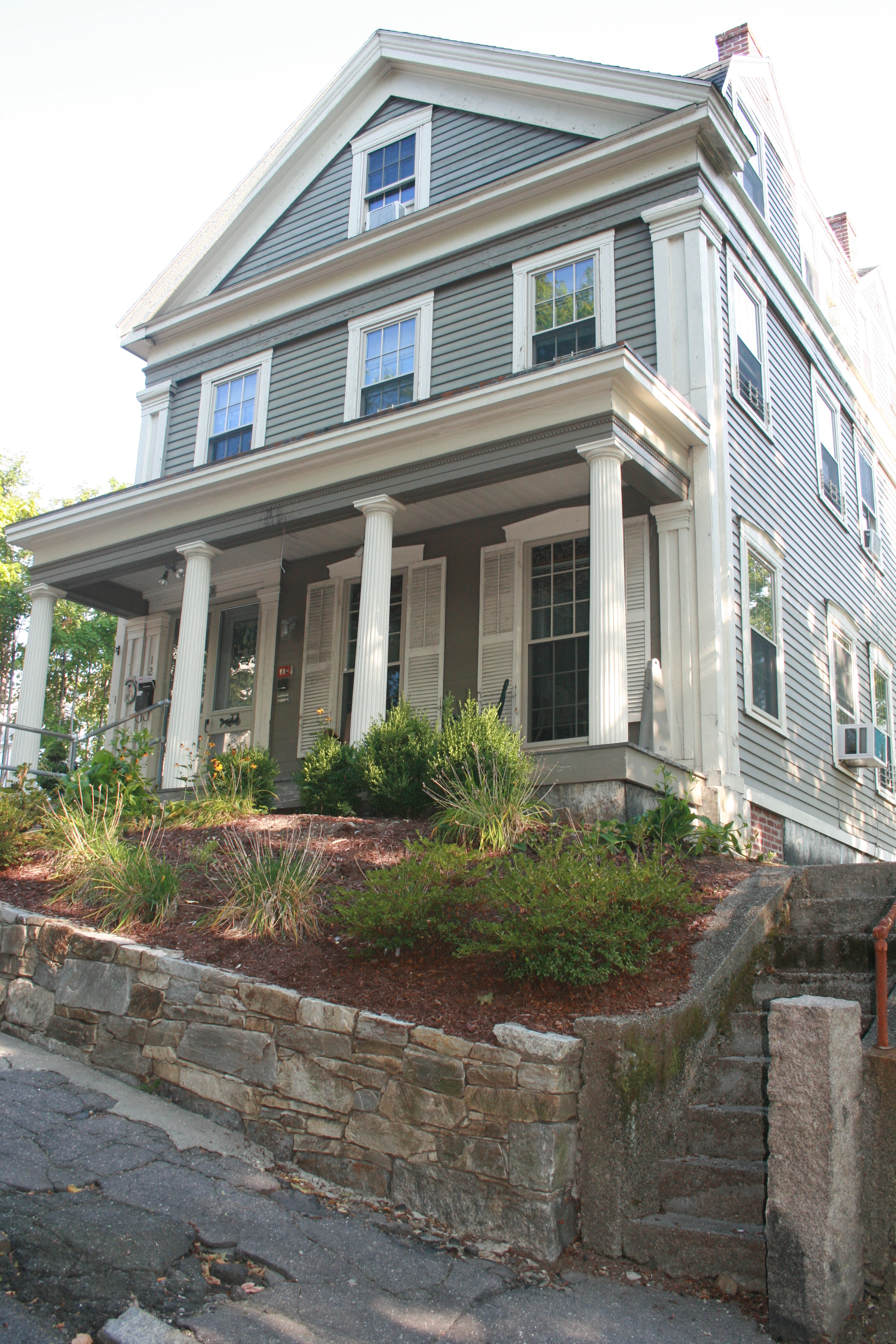

- Location within Massachusetts Location within the United States
- Location: 12 George St., Worcester, Massachusetts
- Coordinates: 42°16′6″N 71°48′8″W
- Built: 1847
- Architectural style: Greek Revival
- MPS: Worcester MRA
- NRHP reference No.: 80000568
- Added to NRHP: March 5, 1980

The Tilley Raymond House is a historic house in Worcester, Massachusetts. Built about 1847 by a prominent local builder, it is a well-preserved local example of a once popular Greek Revival side hall style house. The house was listed on the National Register of Historic Places in 1980.

== Description and history ==
The Raymond House is set on the north side of George Street, a side street that steeply climbs the hill to the west of Worcester's Main Street and downtown. It is a 2 1/2-story wood-frame structure, with a front-facing gable roof, and clapboard siding. The building corners are pilastered, and a single-story porch extends across the front, with fluted Doric columns rising to an entablature and hip roof. The wall under the porch is flushboarded, with long sash windows and the entrance set in the leftmost of three bays. The gable above is fully pedimented, with a sash window at the center.

The house was built c. 1847 by Tilley Raymond, who, along with Horatio Tower, became one of Worcester's leading builders of the 1840s and 1850s. Raymond eventually left for California, apparently to capitalize on the gold rush, and the house was taken over by his son Edward. Edward Raymond was a veteran of the American Civil War, and served locally as the chief of police and clerk of the district court. He was admitted to the bar in 1880 after studying with George Hoar. The house was converted into apartments in 1898.

== See also ==
- Horatio Tower House
- National Register of Historic Places listings in northwestern Worcester, Massachusetts
- National Register of Historic Places listings in Worcester County, Massachusetts
