= P. P. Raymond House =

Historic house in Malcom, Iowa, US

- U.S. National Register of Historic Places
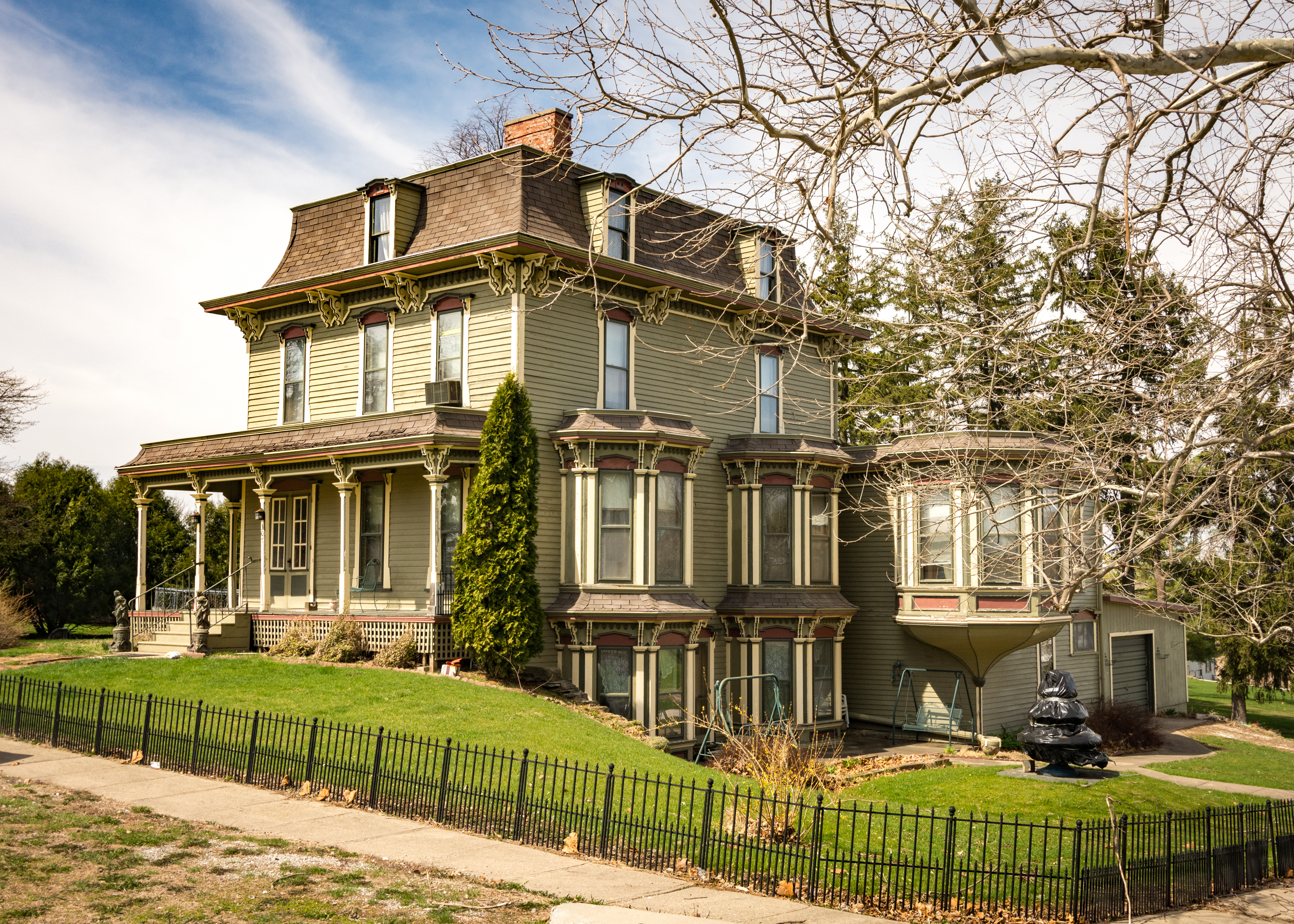

- Location within Iowa Location within the United States
- Location: 307 4th St. Malcom, Iowa
- Coordinates: 41°42′30″N 92°33′22″W
- Area: less than one acre
- Built: 1874
- Architectural style: Second Empire
- NRHP reference No.: 85000873
- Added to NRHP: April 24, 1985

The P. P. Raymond House is a historic building located in Malcom, Iowa, United States. Raymond farmed outside of town from the time he arrived in Poweshiek County in 1856 until he moved into this house in 1874. He founded the town's first and only bank, P. P. Raymond and Sons. The family continued to live in the house until it was sold in 1904. It is a noteworthy example of the Second Empire style found in a small town. It is a 2½-story frame structure that features a mansard roof with a concave slope, elaborate window hoods, window bays, and a turret. The house was listed on the National Register of Historic Places in 1985.

== See also ==
- National Register of Historic Places in Poweshiek County, Iowa
