= Jessie M. Raymond House =

Historic building in Portland, Oregon, U.S.

- U.S. National Register of Historic Places
- Portland Historic Landmark
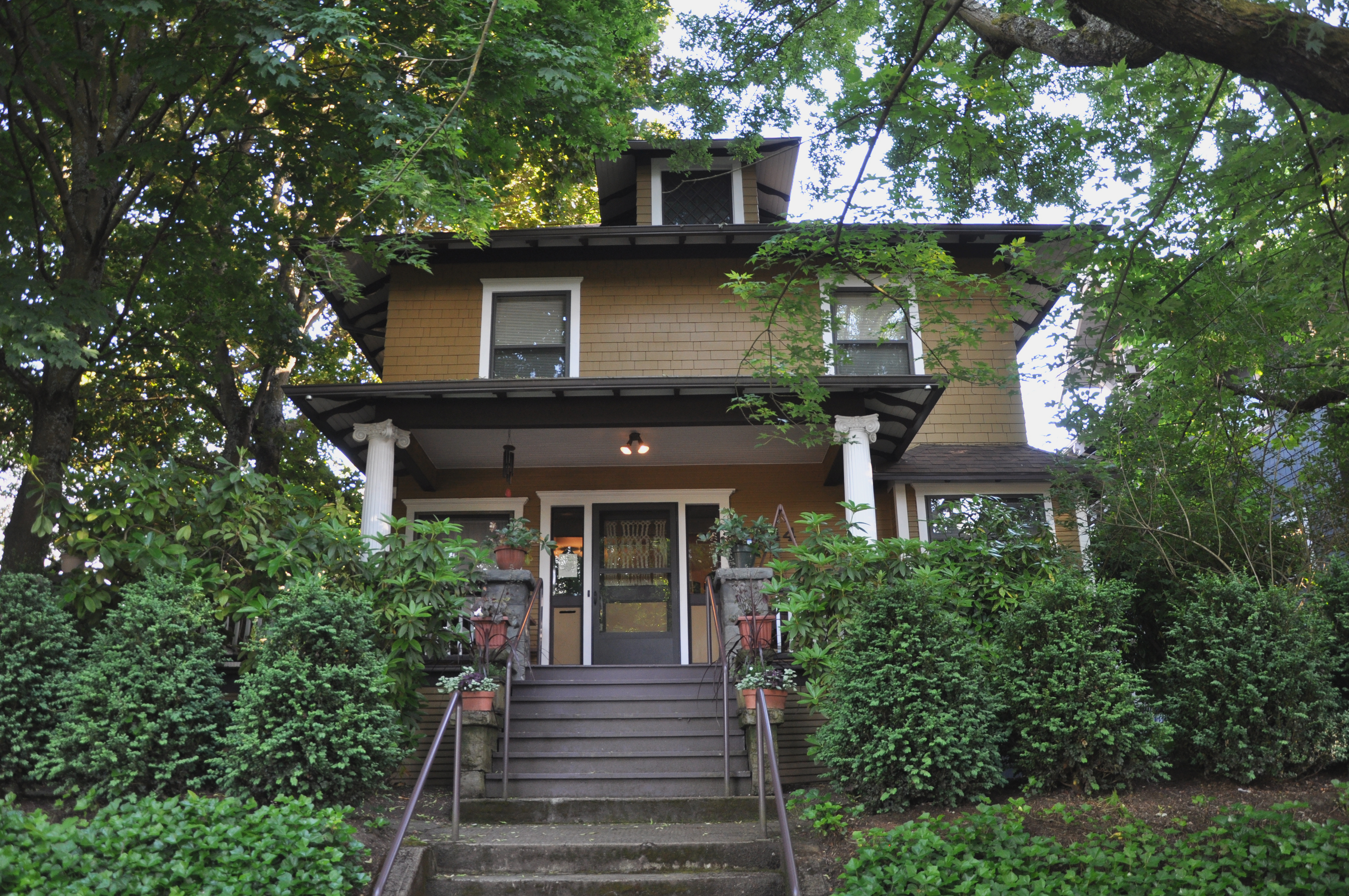
- The Raymond House in 2011

- Location within Portland, Oregon
- Location: 2944 SE Taylor Street; Portland, Oregon
- Coordinates: 45°30′53″N 122°38′06″W
- Built: 1907
- Architectural style: Bungalow/Craftsman
- MPS: Portland Eastside MPS
- NRHP reference No.: 89000106
- Added to NRHP: March 8, 1989

The Jessie M. Raymond House is a house located in southeast Portland, Oregon, listed on the National Register of Historic Places.

== See also ==
- National Register of Historic Places listings in Southeast Portland, Oregon
