= Charles and Joseph Raymond Houses =

Historic house in Pennsylvania, United States

- U.S. National Register of Historic Places
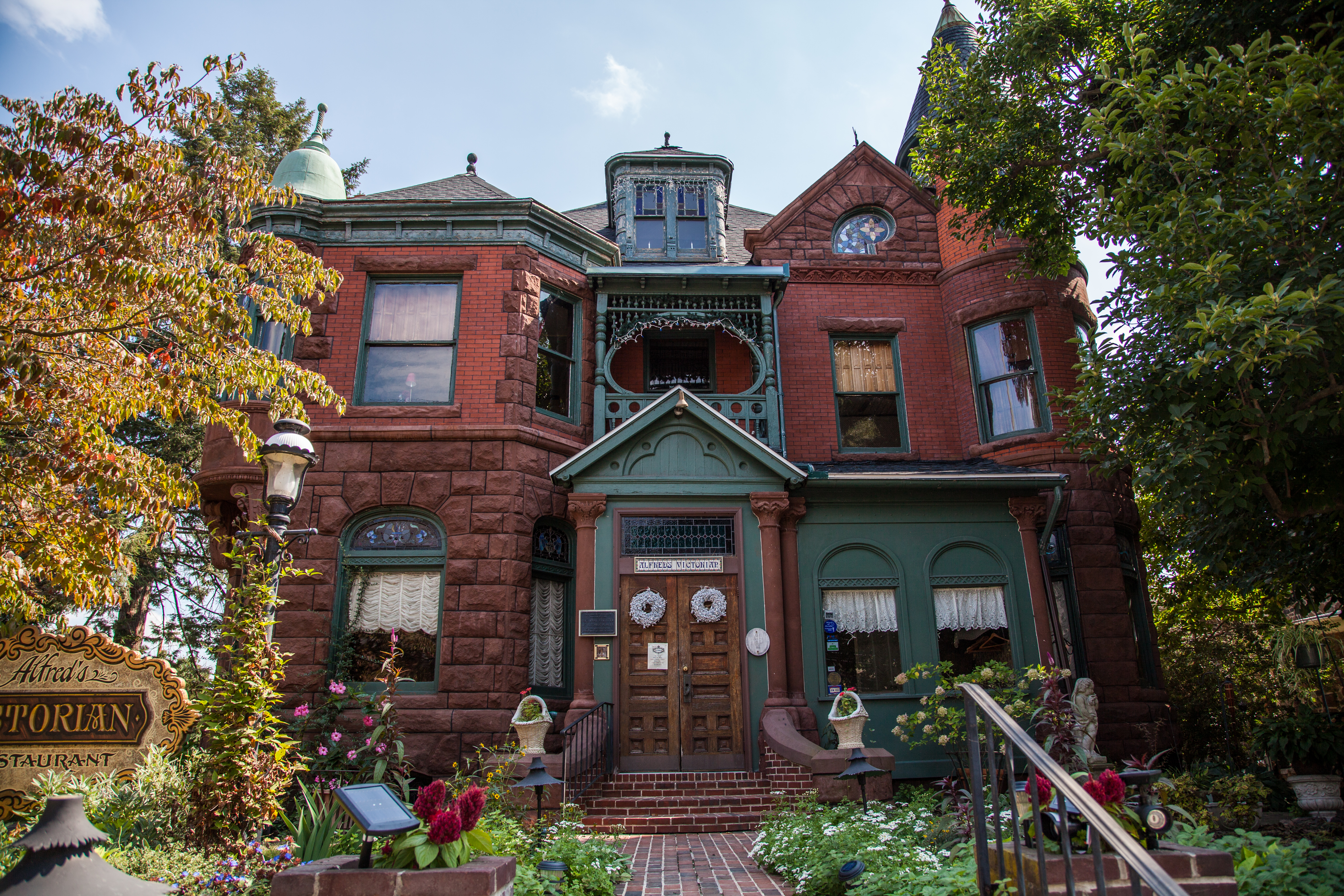
- Charles Raymond House

- Location within Pennsylvania Location within the United States
- Location: 38 and 37 N. Union St, Middletown, Pennsylvania
- Coordinates: 40°11′43″N 76°43′52″W
- Area: 1 acre (0.40 ha)
- Built: 1889, 1891
- Architectural style: Queen Anne
- NRHP reference No.: 79002221
- Added to NRHP: August 1, 1979

Charles and Joseph Raymond Houses consists of two historic homes located at Middletown, Dauphin County, Pennsylvania, United States. They are two irregularly shaped brick and stone mansions in the Queen Anne style. They were built across the street from one another by two brothers, Charles and Joseph Raymond. The Charles Raymond House was built in 1891, and has a rusticated stone first story and a second story of brick. It features a variety of roof shapes and four articulated brick chimneys. The Joseph Raymond House was built in 1889, and has a rusticated stone first story and a second story of brick. It features a circular verandah and a square corner tower with an irregular pyramidal roof. It also has a large circular tower with a conical roof and a second floor balcony.

It was added to the National Register of Historic Places in 1979.

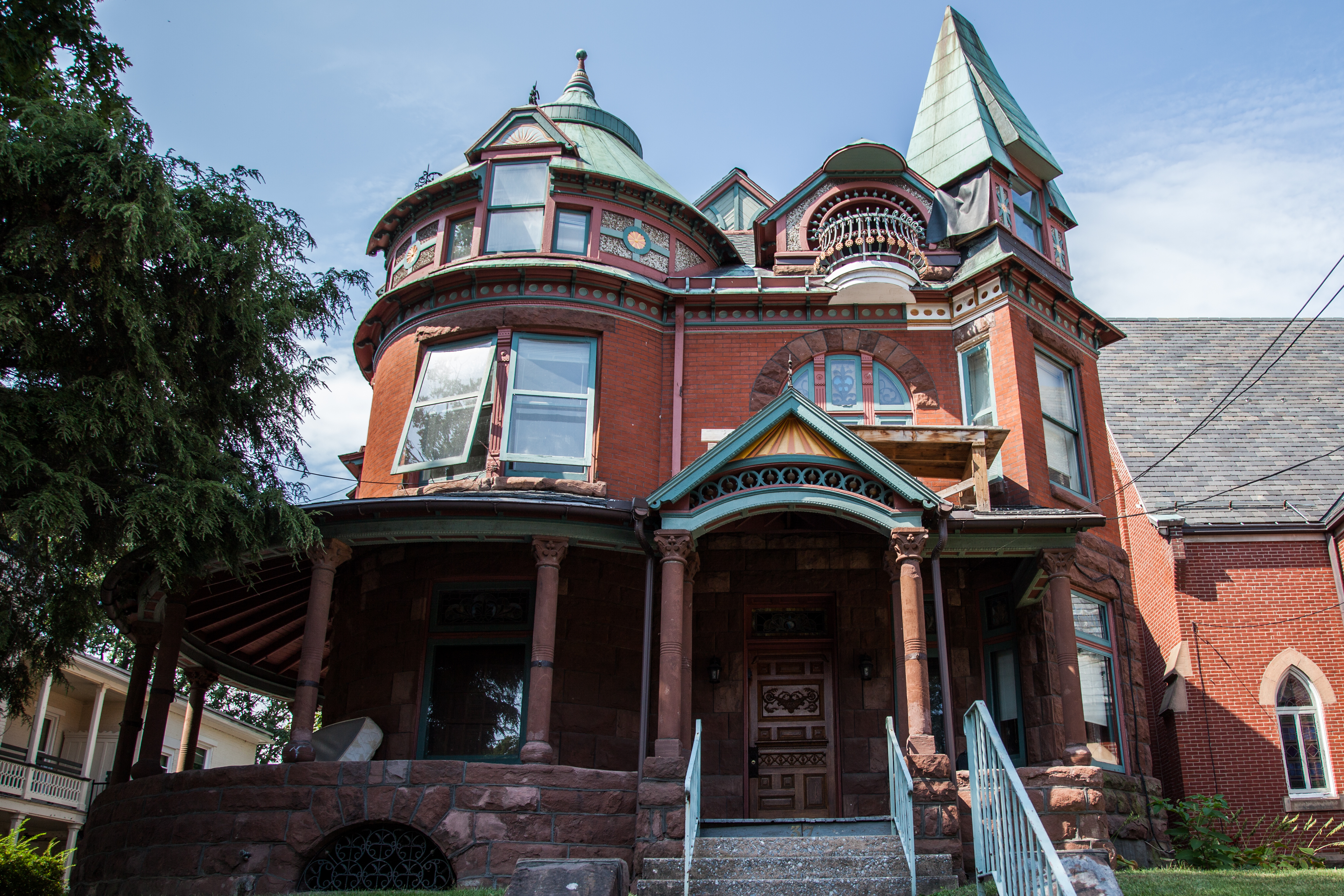
Joseph Raymond House
