= Brooklyn Hotel (Brooklyn, Iowa) =

- U.S. National Register of Historic Places
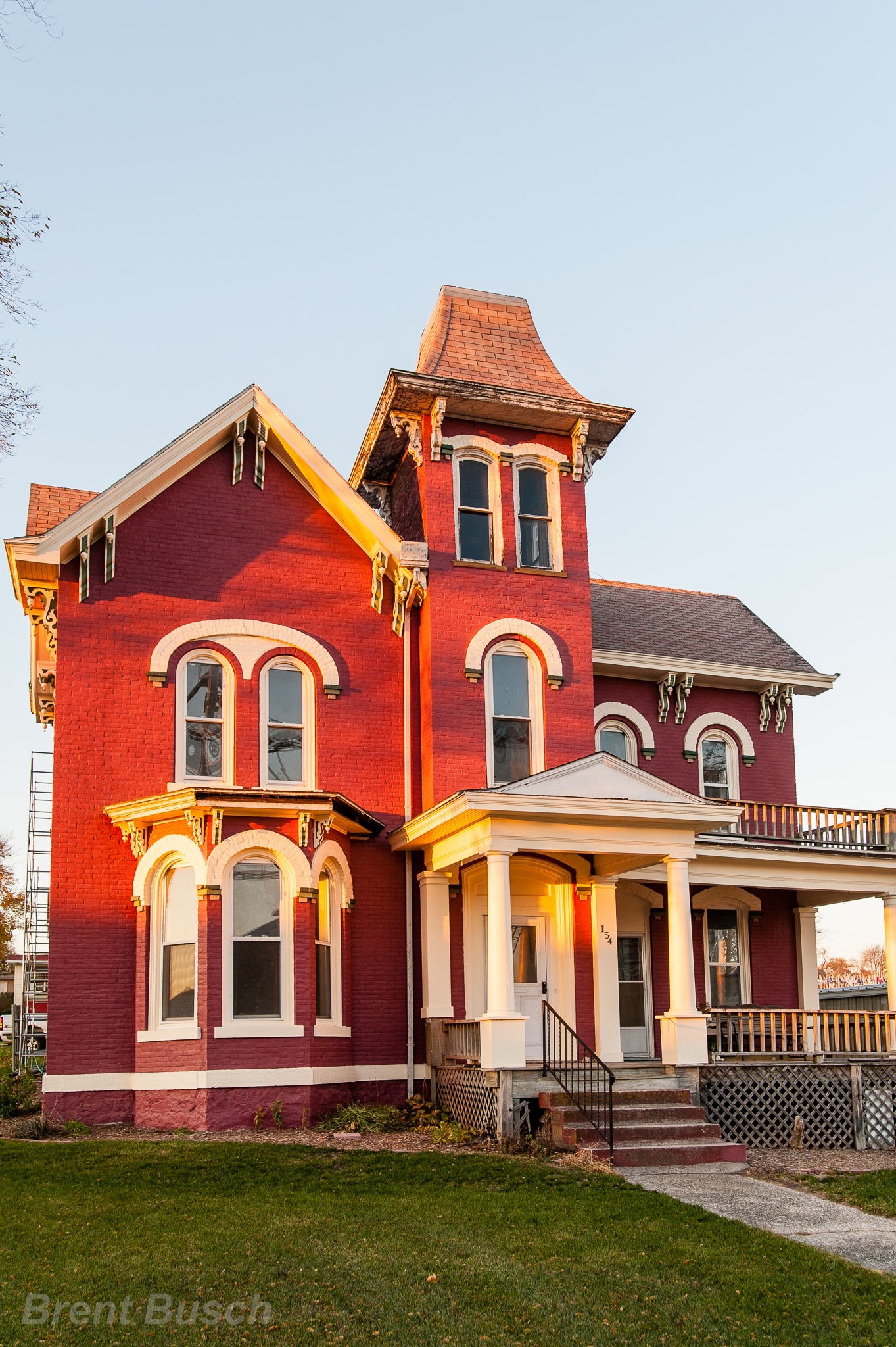

- Location within Iowa Location within the United States
- Location: 154 Front St. Brooklyn, Iowa
- Coordinates: 41°43′42″N 92°26′51″W
- Area: less than one acre
- Built: 1875
- Built by: John Byers
- Architectural style: Italian Villa
- NRHP reference No.: 79000933
- Added to NRHP: October 1, 1979

The Brooklyn Hotel is a historic building located in Brooklyn, Iowa, United States. John Byers, who operated a grocery store and billiard hall, built the structure as a house in 1875. Subsequent owners operated a hotel here. It was known as the Brooklyn Hotel as early as 1894. Dr. Charles Busby was the exception. He operated a small hospital here in the early in the 20th century. The 2½-story building features a three-story entrance tower, bracketed eaves, window sills of limestone quarried nearby, and an irregular plan. The hotel was listed on the National Register of Historic Places in 1979.

== See also ==
- National Register of Historic Places in Poweshiek County, Iowa
