= Grinnell Mutual =

Mutual insurance company

Grinnell Mutual Reinsurance Company, SI
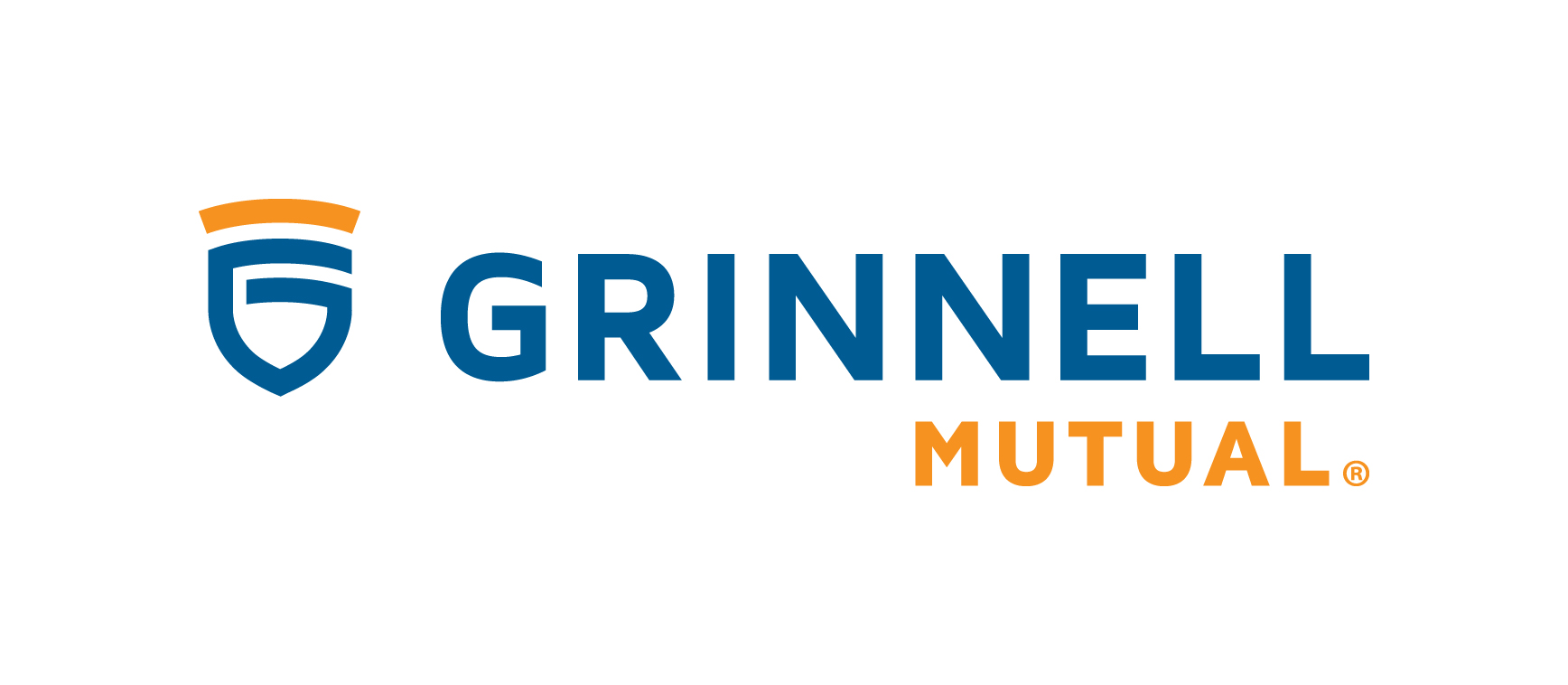
- Type: Mutual
- Industry: Insurance, Reinsurance
- Founded: April 17, 1909
- Headquarters: Grinnell, Iowa, USA
- Number of locations: 17 states
- Key people: Dave Wingert, CEO Roby Shay, Chief Operating Officer
- Number of employees: 620 (as of August 2026)
- Website: grinnellmutual.com

Grinnell Mutual is a property-casualty mutual insurance company and reinsurer based in Grinnell, Iowa, United States.

== Business performance ==
Grinnell Mutual is the 115th largest property-casualty insurance company in the U.S. (according to AM Best, as of July 2026). Its products are available in 17 states. Grinnell Mutual is also the largest direct reinsurer of farm mutual companies in North America and works with more than 1,700 local independent agencies and brokers in Illinois, Indiana, Iowa, Minnesota, Missouri, Nebraska, North Dakota, Ohio, Oklahoma, Pennsylvania, South Dakota, and Wisconsin. As of Dec. 31, 2025, Grinnell Mutual had nearly $2 billion in total assets and over $1 billion in policyholder surplus.

In 2024, Grinnell Mutual undertook a project to reorganize the company as a mutual insurance holding company (MIHC). The reorganization was approved Sept. 18, 2024, by its members. On Oct. 30, 2024, the Iowa Insurance Commissioner held a public hearing on the matter. No input was received and the Commissioner approved the MIHC on Nov. 26, 2026. As of Jan. 1, 2025, Grinnell Mutual became a mutual insurance holding company (MIHC), and its legal name changed to Grinnell Mutual Reinsurance, SI.

The company has held an AM Best 'A' (Excellent) rating for financial strength since 1991.

It has also received recognition as an Iowa Top Workplace every year since the award began in 2011, and a Top Workplace USA for five years running (as of 2026).

== History ==
In 1909, the company was formed in Greenfield, Iowa as "Iowa Farmers Mutual Reinsurance Association" by John Evans to provide reinsurance for county mutuals in Iowa. In 1933, the company moved to Grinnell, Iowa, and changed its name to "Farmers Mutual Reinsurance Association". The name changed again in 1948 to "Farmers Mutual Reinsurance Company". In 1963, the company's name was changed to Grinnell Mutual Reinsurance Company. The current legal name, "Grinnell Mutual Reinsurance Company, SI" was adopted Jan. 1, 2025, to reflect its reorganization to a mutual insurance holding company.

In 2014, Grinnell Mutual was one of first six companies investing in the Global Insurance Accelerator, the first startup accelerator for insurtech.

== Awards ==
In addition to its 'A' rating from AM Best, Grinnell Mutual has been recognized as an Iowa Top Workplace since 2011, and as a Top Workplace USA for five years running (as of 2026).

Grinnell Mutual has been a global top workplace, too, earning a Gallup Exceptional Workplace Award four times. The award recognizes the most engaged workplace cultures globally.

== Related Companies ==
- Grinnell Compass — An auto insurance provider
- Grinnell Select — An auto insurance provider
- Grinnell Specialty Agency — Other lines of insurance
