= Isaac M. Raymond Farm =

- U.S. National Register of Historic Places
- U.S. Historic district
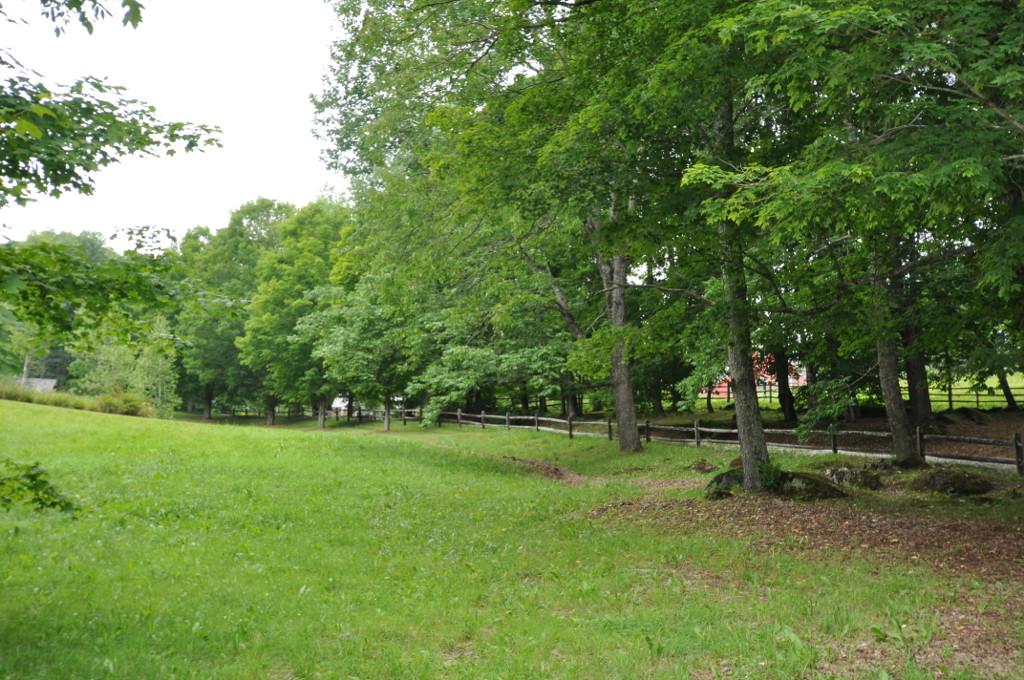
- Hillside lane leading up to the house (partially visible through the trees)

- Location within Vermont Location within the United States
- Location: N. Bridgewater Rd., Woodstock, Vermont
- Coordinates: 43°38′57″N 72°33′59″W
- Area: 81.8 acres (33.1 ha)
- Built: 1835
- Architect: Fiske, Charles
- Architectural style: Colonial Revival, Cape Cod
- MPS: Agricultural Resources of Vermont MPS
- NRHP reference No.: 93000242
- Added to NRHP: April 1, 1993

The Isaac M. Raymond Farm, now Uphill Farm, is a historic farm property on North Bridgewater Road in Woodstock, Vermont, United States. The farm is the reduced core of a larger farm property accumulated in the first half of the 19th century by Isaac Raymond, and revived as a gentleman's farm in 1940. The property includes an altered 1805 Cape style farmhouse and 20th-century Colonial Revival farm buildings. It was listed on the National Register of Historic Places in 1993.

== Description and history ==
The Raymond farm occupies a roughly L-shaped parcel of more than 80 acres (32 ha) on a hillside and hilltop overlooking Gulf Stream, a tributary of the Ottauquechee River flowing roughly southeast to join the river just below Woodstock village. The farm's 19th-century extent ranged as far east as Vermont Route 12 to the east, and included a significant tract to the north. The current property is roughly bounded on the south by North Bridgewater Road, and is accessed via a winding drive, designated as Town Highway 95 in the portion outside the property. Portions of the farm designated for different uses are set off from each other by a variety of stone walls, barbed wire fencing, and split rail fencing. The farmland is a mix of open meadow, woodlots, and cropland. The farmstead includes an 1805 Cape style house, and three barns built in the 1940s. The house was extensively altered at the same time, mainly on the interior, which was apparently gutted.

The core of the farm was acquired in 1801 by James Raymond, who moved to Woodstock from Middleborough, Massachusetts, and was the likely builder of the surviving farmhouse. In 1830 Raymond deeded the property to his son Isaac, who was responsible for its significant enlargement, adding uplands to the north. The Raymonds operated what was essentially a diversified subsistence farming operation, which was continued with tenant farmers operating under lease to absentee owners after the Raymonds sold the property. In 1940, Thomas Crocker III purchased the farm, and transformed it into a gentleman's farm, modernizing the house and replacing the surviving farm buildings with new Colonial Revival structures. A lowland portion of the farm near Route 12 was later sold to the Vermont Land Trust, and is now part of National Park Service-owned property hosting the Appalachian Trail.

== See also ==
- National Register of Historic Places listings in Windsor County, Vermont
