= E.A. and Rebecca (Johnson) Marsh House =

Historic house in Iowa, United States

- U.S. National Register of Historic Places
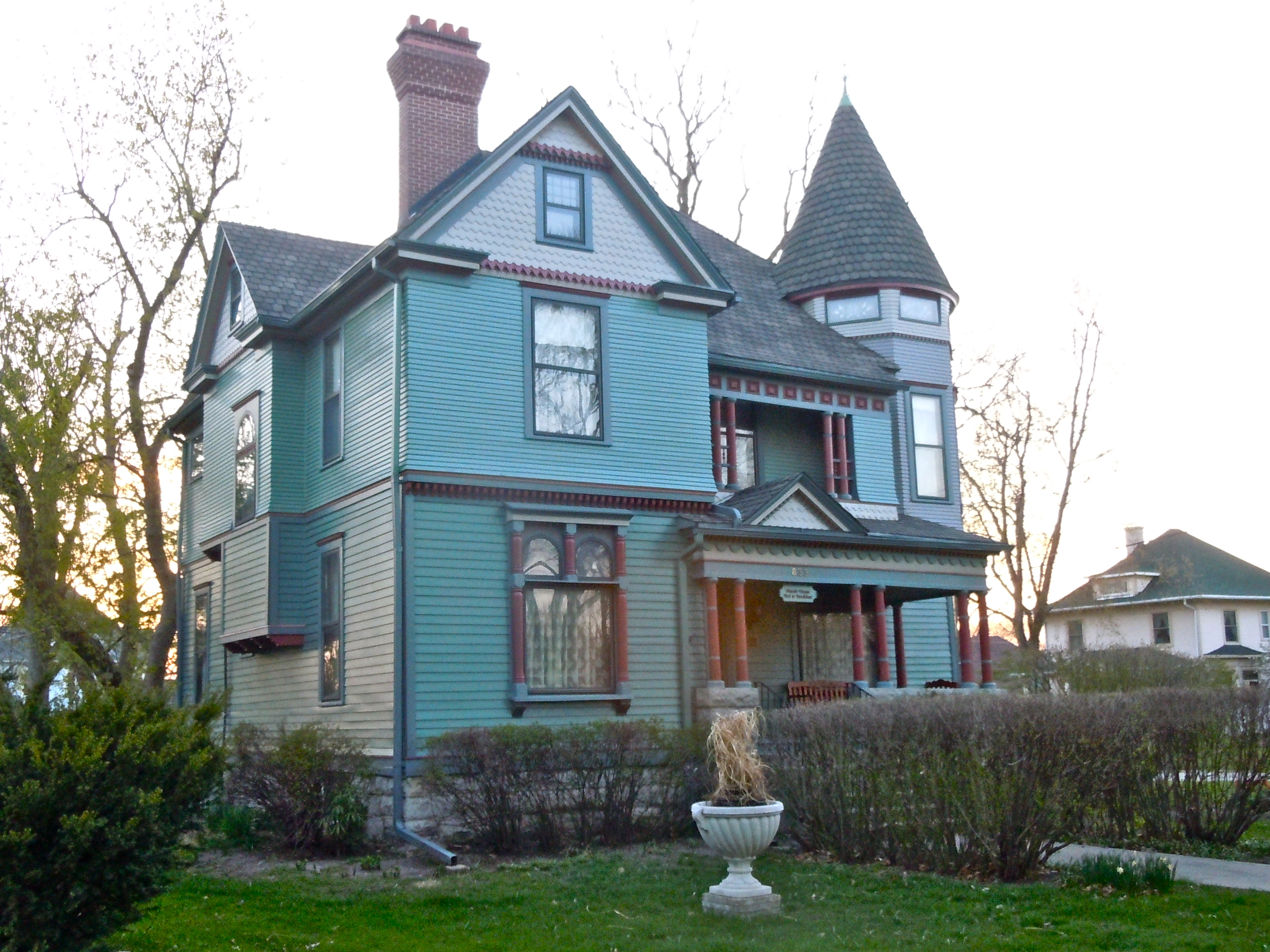

- Location within Iowa Location within the United States
- Location: 833 East St. Grinnell, Iowa
- Coordinates: 41°44′34″N 92°43′05″W
- Area: less than one acre
- Built: 1893
- Architectural style: Queen Anne
- NRHP reference No.: 99000454
- Added to NRHP: April 15, 1999

The E.A. and Rebecca (Johnson) Marsh House is a historic dwelling located in Grinnell, Iowa, United States. Marsh was a jeweler and a leading businessman in the city. His wife, Rebecca Penrose Johnson, bought the property in 1891. Her father was a successful businessman who amassed his own fortune, which is probably why the property was bought in her name. The two-story frame structure features a hipped roof with cross gables and a corner tower. It is one 19 Queen Anne houses in Grinnell with a corner tower. Unlike most of the others, it has maintained a high degree of historic integrity. The house was listed on the National Register of Historic Places in 1999.
