= List of census-designated places in Iowa =

Census-designated places in Iowa

Map of the United States with Iowa highlighted

This is a list of census-designated places in Iowa. The United States Census Bureau defines census-designated places as unincorporated communities lacking elected municipal officers and boundaries with legal status.

As of the 2020 census, Iowa has 86 census-designated places, up from 62 in the 2010 census. Most CDPs in the state are small rural communities.

== Census-designated places ==
| Name | County | Population (2020) | Area (2020) | | Coordinates |
| Name | County | Population (2020) | sq mi | km^{2} | Coordinates |
|---|---|---|---|---|---|
| Amana | Iowa | 388 | 0.992 | 2.6 | 41°48′13″N 91°52′31″W |
| Anderson | Fremont | 37 | 0.329 | 0.9 | 40°47′54″N 95°36′31″W |
| Argo | Scott | 44 | 0.456 | 1.2 | 41°37′33″N 90°26′03″W |
| Argyle | Lee | 91 | 0.603 | 1.6 | 40°32′09″N 91°34′04″W |
| Athelstan | Taylor | 6 | 0.13 | 0.3 | 40°34′22″N 94°32′33″W |
| Augusta | Des Moines | 51 | 0.841 | 2.2 | 40°45′42″N 91°16′38″W |
| Bartlett | Fremont | 5 | 0.4 | 1.0 | 40°53′07″N 95°47′41″W |
| Beaverdale | Des Moines | 880 | 3.189 | 8.3 | 40°50′55″N 91°12′08″W |
| Bentley | Pottawattamie | 93 | 1.027 | 2.7 | 41°22′32″N 95°37′21″W |
| Big Rock | Scott | 49 | 0.33 | 0.9 | 41°46′09″N 90°49′36″W |
| Bolan | Worth | 32 | 2.892 | 7.5 | 43°22′25″N 93°06′31″W |
| Bradford | Franklin | 84 | 0.929 | 2.4 | 42°38′12″N 93°15′09″W |
| Burchinal | Cerro Gordo | 33 | 0.077 | 0.2 | 43°03′53″N 93°16′43″W |
| Burr Oak | Winneshiek | 171 | 0.69 | 1.8 | 43°27′29″N 91°51′43″W |
| California Junction | Harrison | 74 | 0.461 | 1.2 | 41°33′37″N 95°59′41″W |
| Center Junction | Jones | 100 | 0.734 | 1.9 | 42°06′51″N 91°05′25″W |
| Chapin | Franklin | 71 | 0.099 | 0.3 | 42°50′07″N 93°13′19″W |
| Climbing Hill | Woodbury | 97 | 1.281 | 3.3 | 42°20′22″N 96°04′52″W |
| Coalville | Webster | 651 | 2.257 | 5.8 | 42°26′24″N 94°06′57″W |
| Conroy | Iowa | 252 | 0.762 | 2.0 | 41°43′36″N 91°59′55″W |
| Corley | Shelby | 31 | 0.06 | 0.2 | 41°34′40″N 95°19′50″W |
| Delphos | Ringgold | 26 | 0.224 | 0.6 | 40°39′47″N 94°20′22″W |
| Denmark | Lee | 425 | 1.664 | 4.3 | 40°44′04″N 91°20′18″W |
| Diamondhead Lake | Guthrie | 371 | 1.132 | 2.9 | 41°33′17″N 94°15′36″W |
| Douds | Van Buren | 156 | 2.313 | 6.0 | 40°50′41″N 92°04′24″W |
| Downey | Cedar | 112 | 0.675 | 1.7 | 41°36′43″N 91°20′50″W |
| Duncan | Hancock | 57 | 0.792 | 2.1 | 43°06′30″N 93°42′08″W |
| East Amana | Iowa | 64 | 0.374 | 1.0 | 41°48′31″N 91°51′10″W |
| Fairport | Muscatine | 204 | 1.888 | 4.9 | 41°26′23″N 90°55′27″W |
| Frytown | Johnson | 193 | 0.81 | 2.1 | 41°34′19″N 91°43′56″W |
| Garden City | Hardin | 100 | 0.997 | 2.6 | 42°14′44″N 93°23′43″W |
| Green Mountain | Marshall | 113 | 0.686 | 1.8 | 42°06′07″N 92°49′11″W |
| Hayfield | Hancock | 41 | 0.974 | 2.5 | 43°10′43″N 93°41′41″W |
| High Amana | Iowa | 113 | 0.383 | 1.0 | 41°48′04″N 91°56′31″W |
| Holiday Lake | Poweshiek | 473 | 2.828 | 7.3 | 41°49′05″N 92°27′13″W |
| Homestead | Iowa | 135 | 1.302 | 3.4 | 41°45′40″N 91°52′16″W |
| Hutchins | Hancock | 22 | 0.302 | 0.8 | 43°05′16″N 93°53′12″W |
| Irvington | Kossuth | 36 | 1.012 | 2.6 | 43°00′46″N 94°11′45″W |
| Jacksonville | Shelby | 29 | 0.098 | 0.3 | 41°38′42″N 95°09′06″W |
| Kent | Union | 37 | 0.489 | 1.3 | 40°57′13″N 94°27′40″W |
| Kent Estates | Muscatine | 2,074 | 4.55 | 11.8 | 41°27′59″N 91°03′25″W |
| Kingston | Des Moines | 81 | 1.772 | 4.6 | 40°58′45″N 91°02′45″W |
| Lake Panorama | Guthrie | 1,266 | 8.286 | 21.5 | 41°43′18″N 94°24′14″W |
| Leando | Van Buren | 121 | 2.330 | 6.0 | 40°49′16″N 92°04′28″W |
| Little Cedar | Mitchell | 64 | 0.533 | 1.4 | 43°22′48″N 92°43′32″W |
| Loveland | Pottawattamie | 36 | 0.039 | 0.1 | 41°29′49″N 95°53′25″W |
| Lowell | Henry | 70 | 0.998 | 2.6 | 40°50′04″N 91°26′19″W |
| Meyer | Mitchell | 14 | 0.708 | 1.8 | 43°27′43″N 92°42′04″W |
| Middle Amana | Iowa | 543 | 0.972 | 2.5 | 41°47′41″N 91°54′06″W |
| Miller | Hancock | 50 | 2.065 | 5.3 | 43°11′11″N 93°36′28″W |
| Mineola | Mills | 154 | 0.389 | 1.0 | 41°08′29″N 95°41′41″W |
| Mona | Mitchell | 35 | 2.275 | 5.9 | 43°29′10″N 92°57′12″W |
| Montpelier | Muscatine | 186 | 0.49 | 1.3 | 41°27′41″N 90°48′41″W |
| Mooar | Lee | 321 | 2.661 | 6.9 | 40°25′55″N 91°26′41″W |
| Moscow | Muscatine | 290 | 1.265 | 3.3 | 41°34′14″N 91°04′28″W |
| Mount Sterling | Van Buren | 33 | 0.315 | 0.8 | 40°37′07″N 91°56′07″W |
| Mount Union | Henry | 120 | 0.169 | 0.4 | 41°03′28″N 91°23′29″W |
| New Haven | Mitchell | 77 | 1.927 | 5.0 | 43°17′02″N 92°38′32″W |
| Oak Hills | Des Moines | 186 | 1.139 | 2.9 | 40°45′20″N 91°08′59″W |
| Otranto | Mitchell | 27 | 0.41 | 1.1 | 43°27′39″N 92°59′11″W |
| Park View | Scott | 2,709 | 1.481 | 3.8 | 41°41′40″N 90°32′20″W |
| Percival | Fremont | 53 | 0.44 | 1.1 | 40°45′05″N 95°48′48″W |
| Plainview | Scott | 19 | 0.552 | 1.4 | 41°40′02″N 90°46′48″W |
| Portland | Cerro Gordo | 28 | 1.008 | 2.6 | 43°07′21″N 93°08′15″W |
| Randalia | Fayette | 50 | 0.22 | 0.6 | 42°30′53″N 91°31′52″W |
| River Sioux | Harrison | 42 | 0.381 | 1.0 | 41°48′09″N 96°02′53″W |
| Rochester | Cedar | 142 | 0.976 | 2.5 | 41°40′27″N 91°08′40″W |
| Roseville | Floyd | 39 | 3.692 | 9.6 | 43°01′31″N 92°48′29″W |
| St. Benedict | Kossuth | 31 | 0.767 | 2.0 | 43°02′38″N 94°03′39″W |
| St. Joseph | Kossuth | 51 | 0.862 | 2.2 | 42°54′44″N 94°13′51″W |
| Sandusky | Lee | 297 | 1.668 | 4.3 | 40°26′53″N 91°23′21″W |
| Saylorville | Polk | 3,584 | 6.958 | 18.0 | 41°40′51″N 93°37′37″W |
| Sexton | Kossuth | 46 | 2.202 | 5.7 | 43°04′30″N 94°05′21″W |
| South Amana | Iowa | 165 | 1.385 | 3.6 | 41°46′13″N 91°57′36″W |
| Sperry | Des Moines | 124 | 2.238 | 5.8 | 40°57′43″N 91°09′51″W |
| Stone City | Jones | 186 | 1.814 | 4.7 | 42°06′20″N 91°21′01″W |
| Sun Valley Lake | Ringgold | 187 | 2.708 | 7.0 | 40°50′57″N 94°04′03″W |
| Swedesburg | Henry | 99 | 2.304 | 6.0 | 41°06′22″N 91°33′12″W |
| Toeterville | Mitchell | 53 | 0.887 | 2.3 | 43°26′24″N 92°53′17″W |
| Trenton | Henry | 74 | 0.461 | 1.2 | 41°03′58″N 91°38′22″W |
| Twin Lakes | Calhoun | 316 | 1.824 | 4.7 | 42°28′52″N 94°37′47″W |
| Washburn | Black Hawk | 870 | 1.247 | 3.2 | 42°24′37″N 92°16′01″W |
| Watkins | Benton | 116 | 0.414 | 1.1 | 41°53′35″N 91°59′06″W |
| West Amana | Iowa | 140 | 0.272 | 0.7 | 41°48′30″N 91°57′56″W |
| Weston | Pottawattamie | 78 | 0.427 | 1.1 | 41°20′32″N 95°44′41″W |
| Wever | Lee | 101 | 1.476 | 3.8 | 40°42′20″N 91°13′41″W |
| Yarmouth | Des Moines | 61 | 1.711 | 4.4 | 41°01′28″N 91°19′19″W |

== See also ==
- List of cities in Iowa
- List of counties in Iowa
- List of townships in Iowa
