= Amana =

Amana may refer to:Amana, The settlement arm of Gus Emunim, establishing communities in Judea and shomron.

== Places ==
- Amaná, village in La Rioja Province, Argentina
- Amana Colonies, seven villages in Iowa County, Iowa, US
  - Amana (CDP), Iowa
  - East Amana, Iowa
  - High Amana, Iowa
  - Homestead, Iowa
  - Middle Amana, Iowa
  - South Amana, Iowa
  - West Amana, Iowa
- Amaná National Forest, Pará, Brazil
- Amana Nature Reserve, French Guiana
- Amana River, north-eastern Venezuela
- Amanã River, north-western Brazil
- Amanã Sustainable Development Reserve, a protected area in the Amazon region of Brazil
- Mount Amana, mountain described in the Bible, or an adjacent river

== Organizations ==
- Amana Alliance, a political coalition in Benin
- Amana Bank (Sri Lanka), a commercial bank in Sri Lanka
- Amana Bank (Tanzania), a commercial bank in Tanzania
- Amana Academy, a charter school in Roswell, Georgia
- Amana Corporation, an American brand of household appliances
- Amana (organization), the Israeli settlement movement
- Amana Mutual Funds Trust, an American financial company
- Amana Contracting and Steel Buildings, a UAE construction company
- Amanat Baghdad, an Iraqi football club, also known as Al-Amana

== Other uses ==
- Amana, the airliner involved in the 1950 Australian National Airways Douglas DC-4 crash in Western Australia
- Amana (plant), a genus of tulip like flowers
- Amana (moth)
- Amana German, a German dialect
- Amana Cup, a defunct association football competition in Yemen
- Amana Church Society, a 19th Century religious movement in America
- The slogan of the Nigerien political party, Union for Democracy and Social Progress

== People with the name Amana ==
- Amana Melome, German musician
- Edet Amana (born 1938), Nigerian engineer
- Yolande Amana Guigolo (born 1997), Cameroonian volleyball player
