= Iowa Highway 220 =

State highway in Iowa, United States

Iowa Highway 220
- Iowa 220 highlighted in red

Route information
- Maintained by Iowa DOT
- Length: 7.233 mi (11.640 km)
- Tourist routes: Amana Colonies Trail

Major junctions
- West end: US 6 at South Amana
- East end: US 151 at Amana

Location
- Country: United States
- State: Iowa
- Counties: Iowa

Highway system
- Iowa Primary Highway System; Interstate; US; State; Secondary; Scenic
← US 218	→ Iowa 224

Iowa Highway 220 (Iowa 220) is a short state highway through the Amana Colonies in east-central Iowa. Along with U.S. Highway 6 (US 6) and US 151, it is part of the circuitous Amana Colonies Trail scenic byway. Iowa 220 begins at US 6 in South Amana and ends at US 151 in Amana.

== Route description ==
Iowa Highway 220 begins at an intersection with US 6 in South Amana It heads north into South Amana where it goes through an S-curve before crossing an Iowa Interstate Railroad line. North of South Amana, Iowa 220 crosses the Iowa River and Mill Race, which powered mills in the Amana Colonies.

At West Amana, Iowa 220 turns east onto an east–west alignment. It moves through High Amana and turns to the south-southeast towards Middle Amana, where it passes the Amana Corporation manufacturing facility. From Middle Amana, it turns to the northeast and then to the east as it enters Amana, ending at a four-way stop with US 151.

== History ==
Iowa 220 was created in the early 1930s as a spur route from West Amana to Amana. By 1947, Iowa 220 ran from South Amana to Amana along the current extent of the route. However, the route continued east for 1.5 miles (2.4 km) where it ended at East Amana and south for 1 mile (1.6 km) to Upper South Amana. At its longest, the route was 9.5 miles (15.3 km) long. The western end of the route was pulled back to its current western end in 1976. Four years later, its eastern end was truncated back to the intersection with Iowa 149 in Amana. In 1985, Iowa 149 was replaced by US 151 between Cedar Rapids and Interstate 80.

== Major intersections ==
The entire route is in Iowa County.

Location	mi	km	Destinations	Notes
South Amana	0.000	0.000	US 6 – Homestead, Marengo	
West Amana	2.205	3.549	CR F15	Iowa 220 becomes an east–west route
Middle Amana	5.514	8.874	CR W22	
Amana	7.233	11.640	US 151 – Homestead, Cedar Rapids	
1.000 mi = 1.609 km; 1.000 km = 0.621 mi
