= Amana (CDP), Iowa =

Amana, Iowa
- Census-designated place
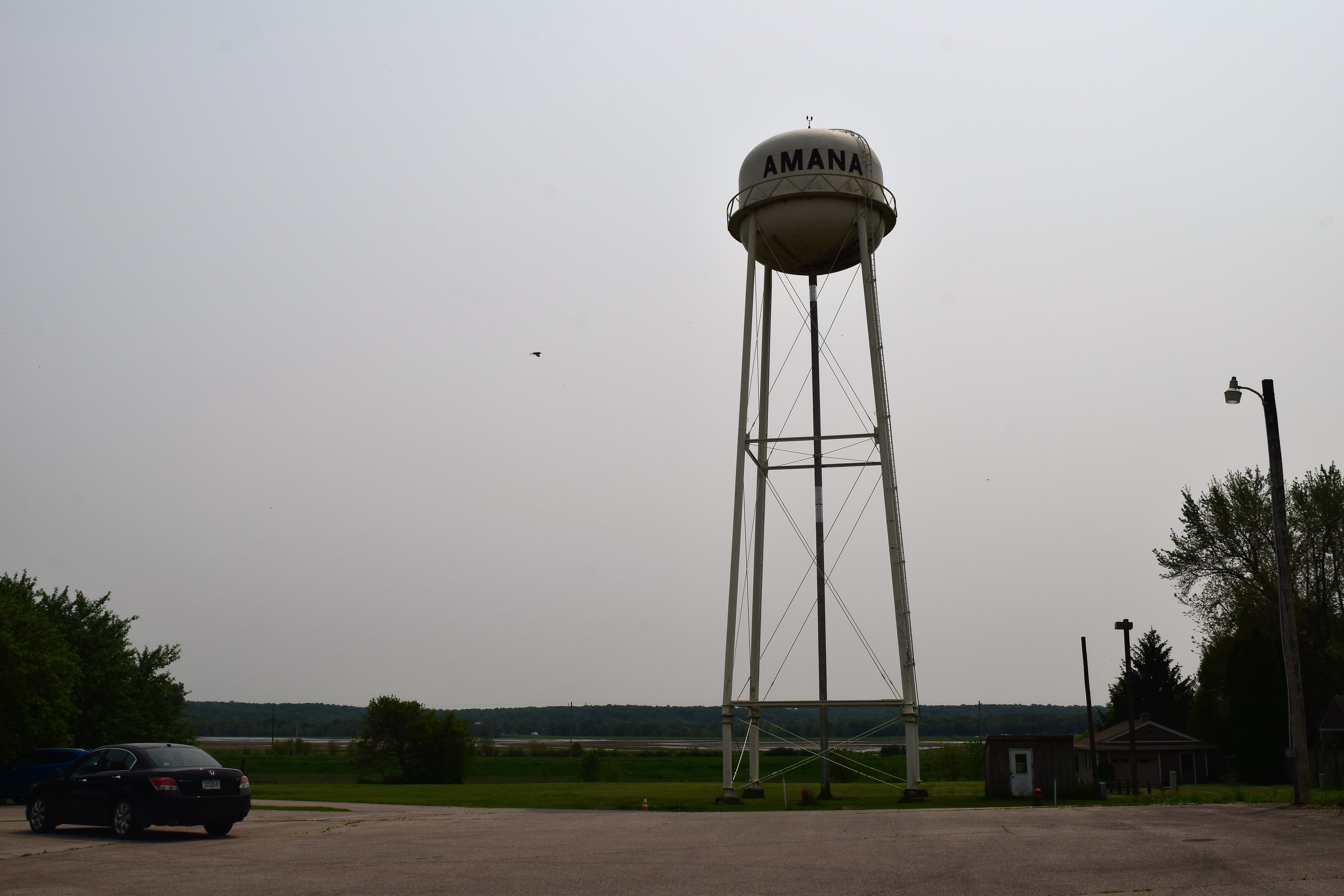
- Amana water tower

- Location within Iowa Location within the United States
- Coordinates: 41°48′08″N 91°52′21″W
- Country: United States
- State: Iowa
- County: Iowa

Area
  - Total: 0.99 sq mi (2.57 km^{2})
  - Land: 0.99 sq mi (2.57 km^{2})
  - Water: 0 sq mi (0.00 km^{2})
- Elevation: 725 ft (221 m)

Population (2020)
  - Total: 388
  - Density: 391.3/sq mi (151.07/km^{2})
- Time zone: UTC-6 (Central (CST))
  - Summer (DST): UTC-5 (CDT)
- ZIP codes: 52203, 52204
- Area code: 319
- FIPS code: 19-01720
- GNIS feature ID: 2629957

Amana (also known as Main Amana) is an unincorporated community and census-designated place (CDP) in Iowa County, Iowa, United States. It is one of the Amana Colonies, seven villages built by German Pietists in the 19th century. As of the 2020 census, Amana had a population of 388, down from 442 in the 2010 census.

== Geography ==
Amana is in northeastern Iowa County, on the south side of Price Creek in the valley of the Iowa River. It is bordered to the west by Lily Pond and the village of Middle Amana, while East Amana is to the east. U.S. Route 151 passes through Amana, leading northeast 19 miles (31 km) to Cedar Rapids and south 3 miles (5 km) to U.S. Route 6 at Homestead. Iowa Highway 220 leads west through the villages of Middle Amana, High Amana, and West Amana, ultimately reaching US 6 at South Amana, 7 miles (11 km) from Amana village.

According to the U.S. Census Bureau, the Amana CDP has an area of 1.1 square miles (2.9 km^{2}), all land.

== Demographics ==
Historical population
Census	Pop.	Note	%±
2010	442		—
2020	388		−12.2%
U.S. Decennial Census

== See also ==
- Amana Colonies
