= Yemeni Football Records =

Football stats of Yemen

Records and statistics of football in Yemen.

== Most Successful Teams ==
=== Successful Teams ===
Team	Total Number of Trophies	Yemeni League	President Cup	Super Cup	Unity Cup	Naseem Cup	September 26 Cup	Amana Cup	Ali Muhsin Cup	Esteghlal Cup	North Yemen Cup	South Yemen Cup
Al-Ahli (San'a')	22	10 (1981, 1983, 1984, 1988, 1992, 1994, 1999, 2000, 2001, 2007)	3 (2001, 2004, 2009)	3 (2007, 2008, 2009)	1 (2004)					1 (2006)	4 (1980, 1982, 1983, 1984)	
Al-Wahda (San'a')	7	5 (1979, 1995, 1997, 1998, 2002)			1 (1998)						1 (1978)	
Al-Tilal	7	2 (1991, 2005)	1 (2007)		1 (1999)	2 (2000, 2003)			1 (2003)			
Al Sha'ab Ibb	7	2 (2003, 2004)	2 (2002, 2003)				1 (2002)			1 (2008)	1 (1981)	
Al-Hilal Al-Sahili	5	2 (2008, 2009)	2 (2005, 2008)				1 (2003)					
Al-Saqr	3	2 (2006, 2010)			1 (2008)							
Al-Sha'ab Hadramaut	3		2 (2000, 2006)		1 (2009)							
Al Yarmouk (San'a')	2	2 (1989, 1990)										
Al-Oruba	2	1 (2011)		1 (2011)								
Al Zuhra San'a'	2	1 (1980)									1 (1979)	
May 22 (Sana'a)	2				1 (2007)			1 (2007)				
Al Shorta (San'a')	1	1 (1986)										
Al-Shorta (Aden)	1	1 (1984)										
Al Sha'ab San'a'	1	1 (1982)										
Al-Ahli (Hudaida)	1		1 (1996)									
Al-Ittihad (Ibb)	1		1 (1998)									
Mueen	1									1 (2007)		
Al-Wahda (Aden)	1											1 (1984)
