= Ambrose, Iowa =

- unincorporated community
- Location within Iowa
- Coordinates: 41°31′53″N 92°14′1″W
- Country: United States
- State: Iowa
- County: Iowa County
- Elevation: 856 ft (261 m)
- Time zone: UTC-6 (Central (CST))
  - Summer (DST): UTC-5 (CDT)
- GNIS feature ID: 464229

Ambrose was an unincorporated community in Iowa County, in the U.S. state of Iowa.

== Geography ==
Ambrose was located at 41°31′53″N 92°14′1″W, just west of Armah, Iowa. The two hamlets shared a cemetery: the Ambrose Catholic Armah Cemetery.

== History ==
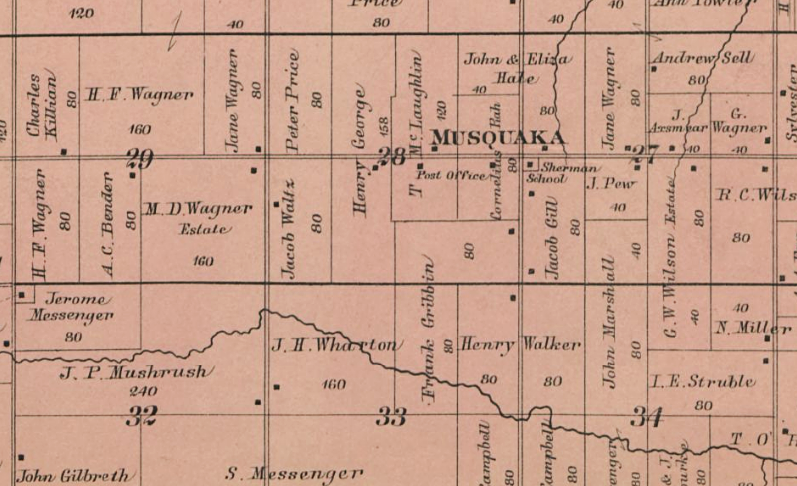
Musquaka, Iowa, in 1886

The area was served by a post office called Musquaka, which operated from 1874 to 1895. The Musquaka post office was changed to Ambrose in 1895.

Ambrose's population was 96 in 1900. Ambrose's post office was discontinued in 1902; after that, mail was routed through the nearby town of Keswick. In the early 20th century, the towns of Keswick, Armah, and Ambrose shared a telephone company. This was known as the Keswick, Ambrose, and Armah Mutual Telephone Company.

The population of Ambrose was 35 in 1920.

By 1940, Ambrose's population had dropped to 7.

== See also ==
- Conroy, Iowa
