= English Township =

English Township may refer to:

- English Township, Jersey County, Illinois
- English Township, Iowa County, Iowa
