= Homestead (meteorite) =

Meteorite found in the United States

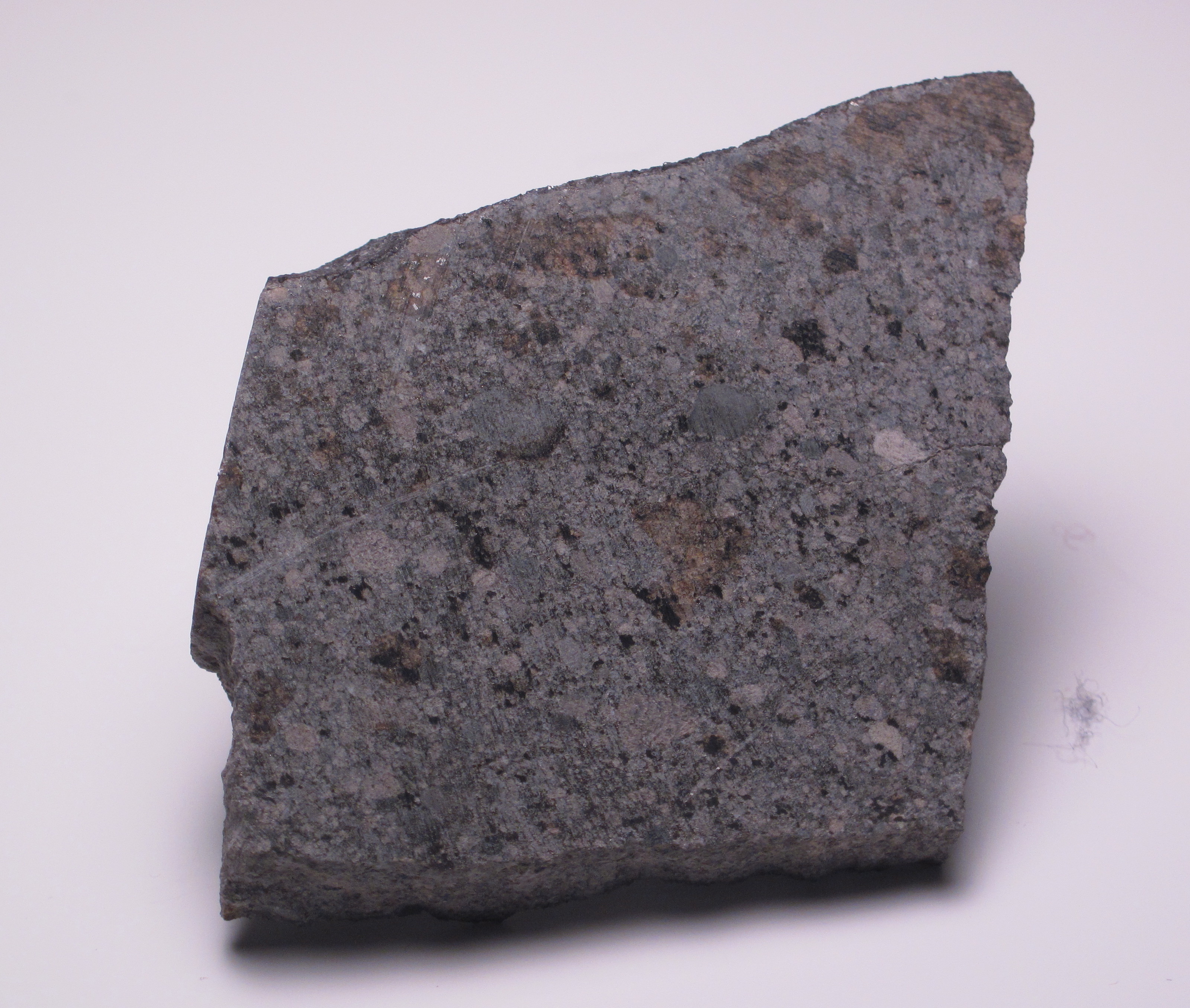
- 20.4 g partial slice taken from the 450 g fragment that resided in the AMNH for over a century
- Type: Chondrite
- Class: Ordinary chondrite
- Group: L5
- Country: United States
- Region: Iowa
- Coordinates: 41°48′N 91°52′W
- Observed fall: Yes
- Fall date: 1875-02-12
- TKW: 230 kg
- Strewn field: Yes
- Alternative names: Amana, Iowa County
- Related media on Wikimedia Commons

Homestead is a L5 meteorite fallen on 12 February 1875 in Iowa, United States, first described by Gustavus Detlef Hinrichs. Sometimes called the Amana meteorite because of the nearby Amana Colonies it was called the Homestead meteorite, because Homestead, Iowa was the nearest train station. The Amana meteorites also include a large meteorite fallen in May 1879.

== History ==
On the evening of 12 February 1875 above Iowa a brilliant fireball was observed. It produced a variety of rumbling sounds and detonations, which shook houses "as if moved by an earthquake".

About 100 meteorite fragments fell over a 18-square-mile (47 km^{2}) snowy countryside area from Amana to Boltonville in Iowa County.

The first found fragment, a stone weighing about 3.5 kilograms (7.7 lb), was discovered by Sarah Sherlock 3 kilometres (1.9 mi) south of Homestead. The area was wooded and covered by snow, impeding recovery efforts. On 10 February a 40 centimetres (16 in) snowfall blanketed the ground, preventing the great majority of the fragments from being discovered until spring. The 74 pounds (34 kg) main mass was found along with a 48 pounds (22 kg) fragment buried 2 feet (0.61 m) in the soil.

The meteorite made international news. Gustavus Detlef Hinrichs, a natural scientist from the University of Iowa reported about it in Popular Science Monthly in 1875.

As of December 2011, approximately 230 kilograms (510 lb) has been found.

The meteorite has brought "a small fortune" to the Amana area, as pieces were sold for a day s wage per pound at the time and added to collections in the US and Europe.

=== 1879 ===
The Amana meteorites also include a large meteorite fallen in Estherville, Iowa on May 10, 1879. Its largest piece weighed 437 pounds and buried 14 feet deep into a farm field. It is the largest witnessed meteorite in North America. The largest piece can be visited at the Estherville Meteorite Center, in downtown Estherville.

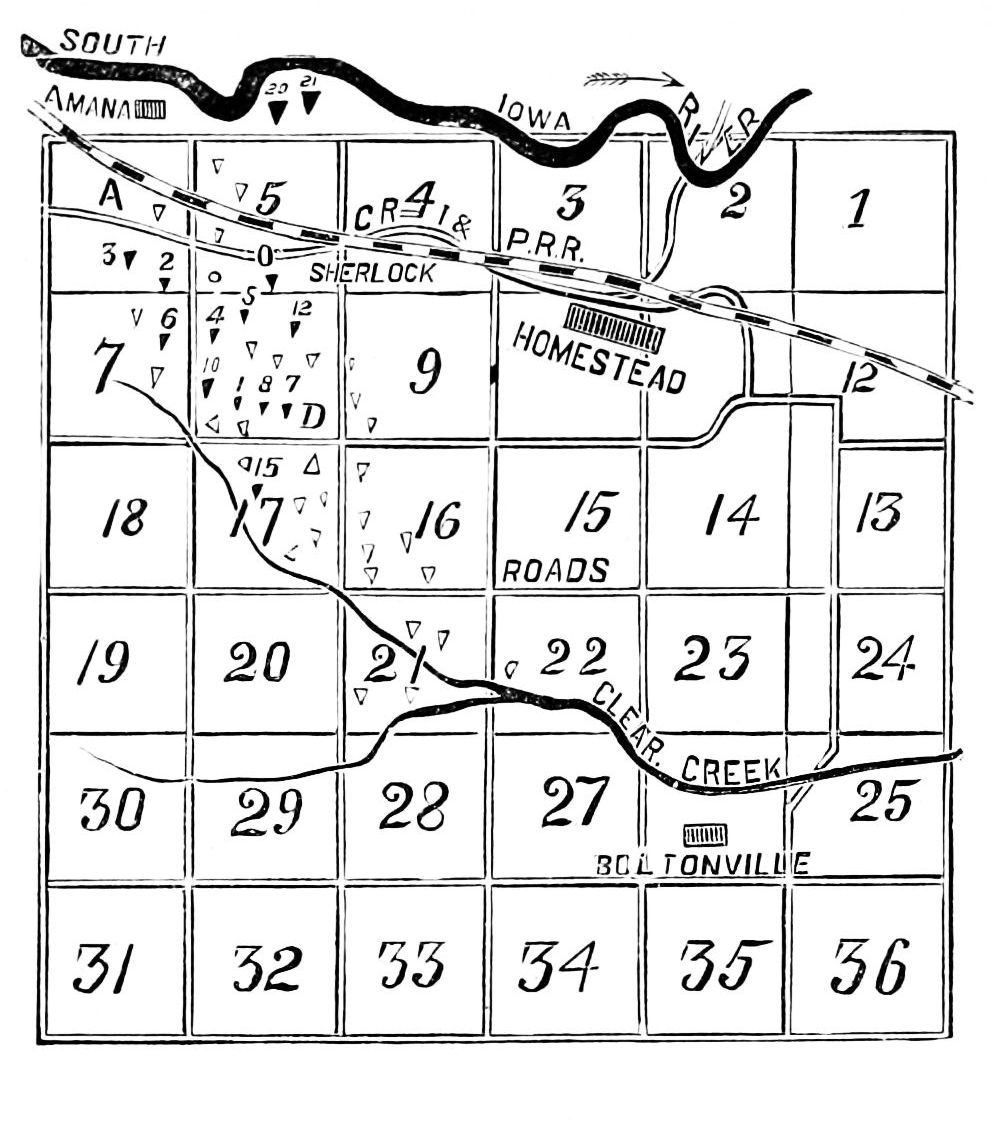
Homestead meteorite strewnfield

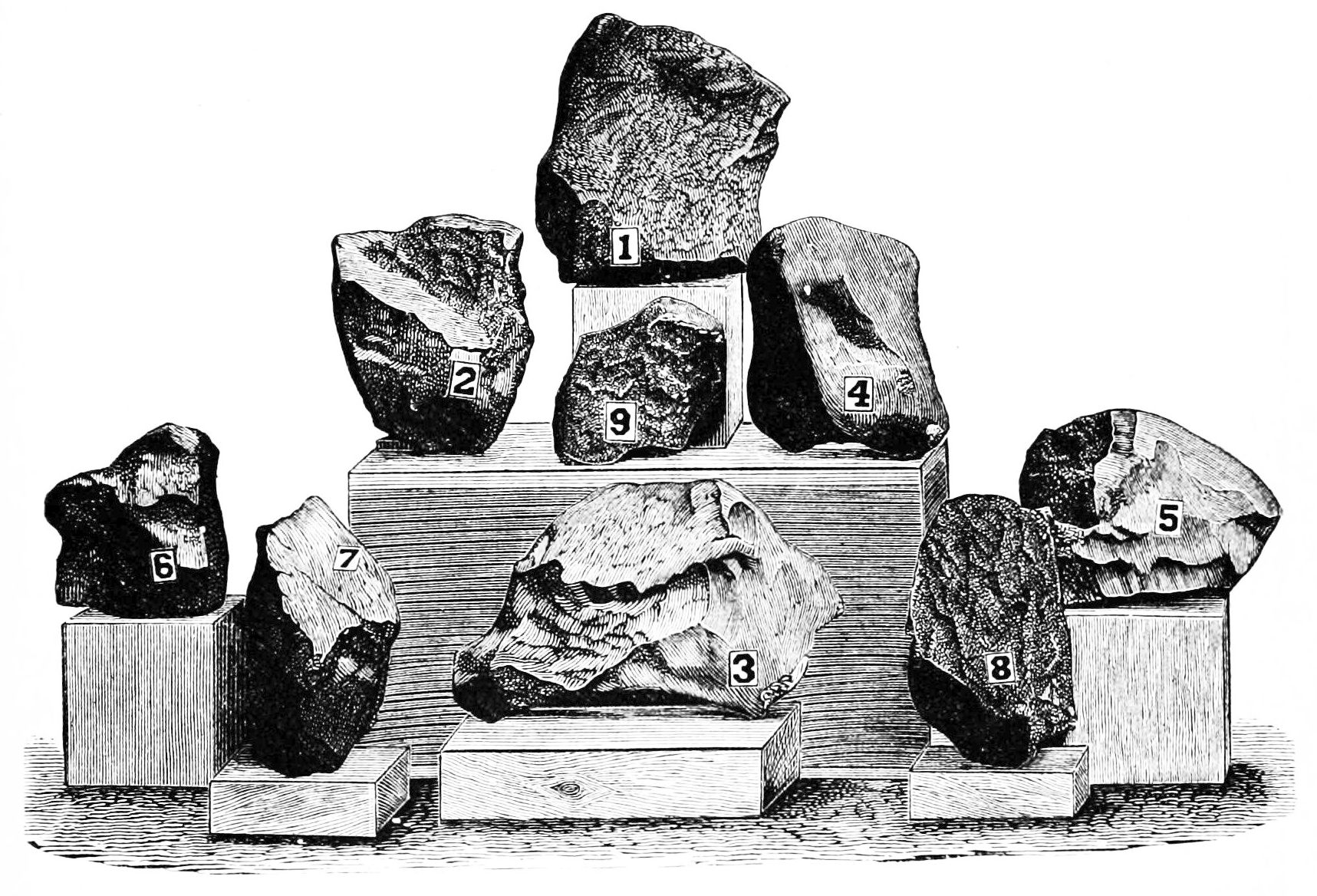
1875 drawing of some fragments

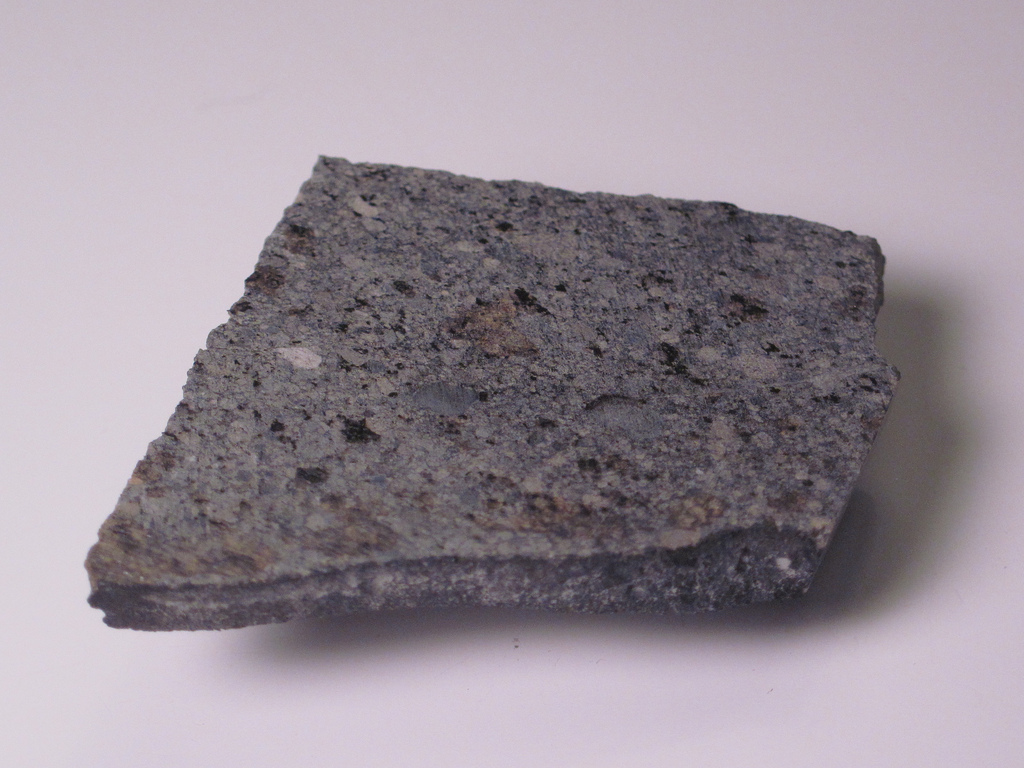
Crusted edge

== Composition and classification ==
It is a L5 type ordinary chondrite. It is also brecciated and veined.

== See also ==
- Glossary of meteoritics

== Bibliography ==
- Ivanova, M. A.; Krot, A. N.; Mitreikina, O. B.; Zinovieva, N. G., "Chromite-rich Inclusions in the Homestead (L5) Chondrite", Abstracts of the Lunar and Planetary Science Conference, volume 23, page 585, 03/1992.
