= Plagmann Round Barn =

- U.S. National Register of Historic Places
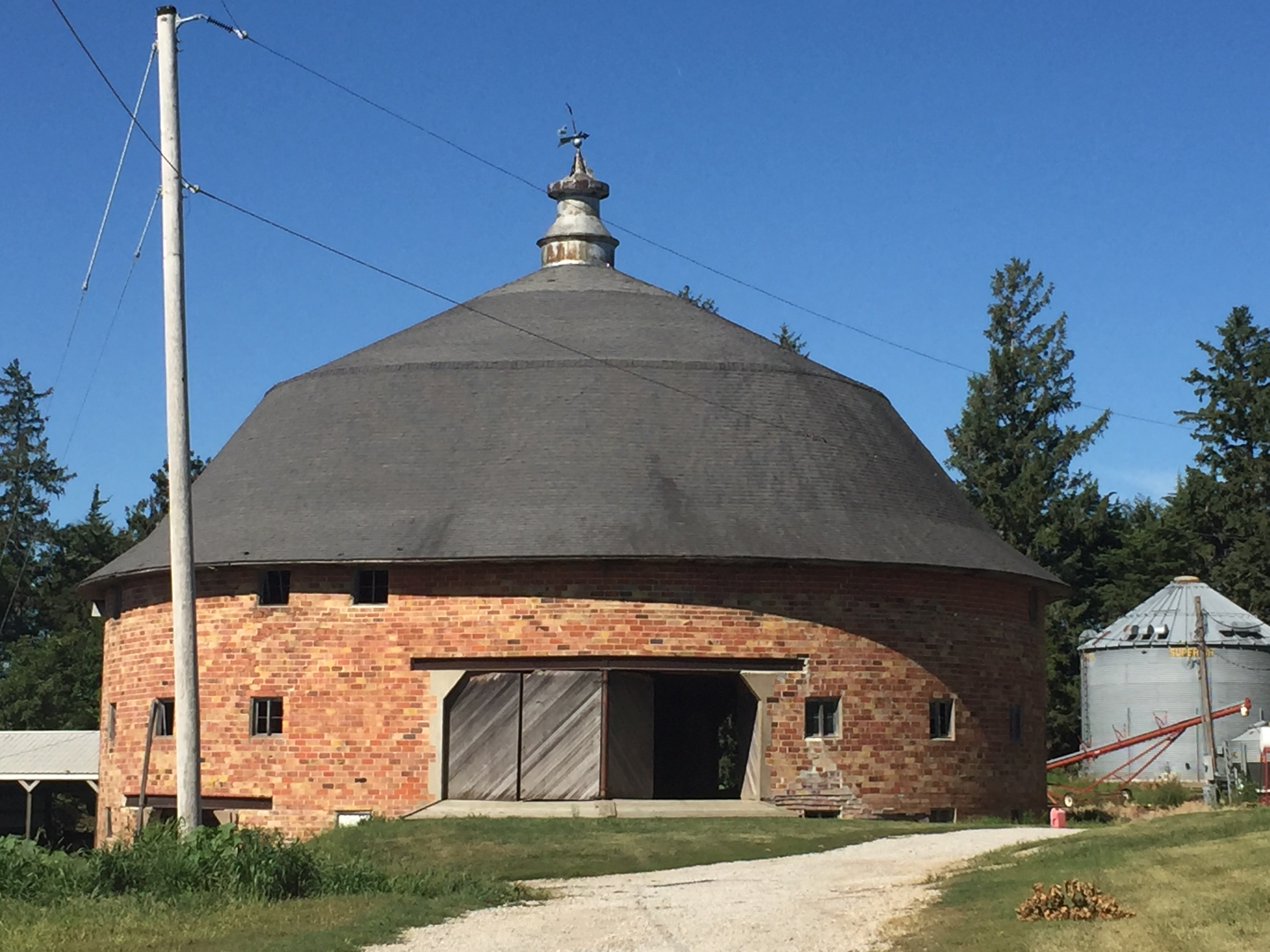
- Plagmann Round Barn

- Location within Iowa Location within the United States
- Location: County Road V66
- Nearest city: Conroy, Iowa
- Coordinates: 41°43′30.5″N 92°3′23.9″W
- Area: less than one acre
- Built: 1912
- Built by: Charles & Richard Plagmann
- MPS: Iowa Round Barns: The Sixty Year Experiment TR
- NRHP reference No.: 86001440
- Added to NRHP: June 30, 1986

The Plagmann Round Barn is an historic building located near Conroy in rural Iowa County, Iowa, United States. It was built in 1912 as a cattle barn by Charles and Richard Plagmann. The building is a true round barn that measures 100 feet (30 m) in diameter. It is one of the largest Iowa Agriculture Experimental Station/Matt King type barns in the state. It is three floored — at the bottom is the feeding floor, at the middle is the stalls and at the top is the haymow. The barn is constructed of terracotta clay tile and features an aerator, a two-pitch roof and a 16-foot (4.9 m) central silo. It has been listed on the National Register of Historic Places since 1986.
