= Iowa Township, Iowa County, Iowa =

Township in Iowa County, Iowa, U.S.

Coordinates: 41.7306°N 91.8908°W

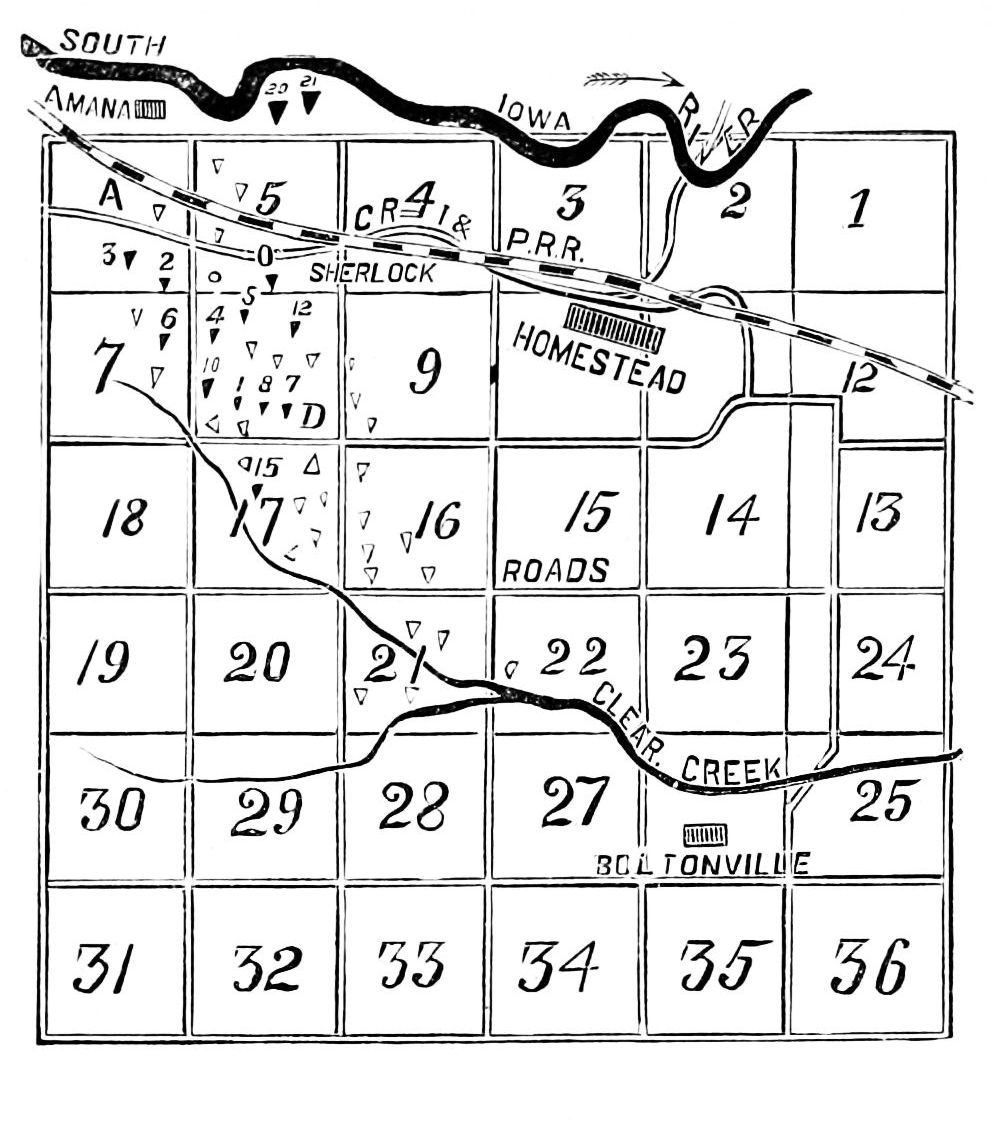
Iowa Township, Iowa County, Iowa, Homestead meteorite strewnfield

Iowa Township is a township in Iowa County, Iowa, United States.

== History ==
Iowa Township was established in 1847.
