= Pilot Township, Iowa County, Iowa =

Township in Iowa County, Iowa, U.S.

Coordinates: 41.6356°N 92.1161°W

Pilot Township is a township in Iowa County, Iowa, United States.

It was established in 1862.
