= Greene Township, Iowa County, Iowa =

Township in Iowa County, Iowa, U.S.

Coordinates: 41.5569°N 91.8883°W

Greene Township is a township in Iowa County, Iowa, United States.

== History ==
Greene Township was established in 1847. It was named for General Nathanael Greene.
