= Troy Township, Iowa County, Iowa =

Township in Iowa County, Iowa, U.S.

Coordinates: 41.6408°N 92.0161°W

Troy Township is a township in Iowa County, Iowa, United States.

== History ==
Troy Township was established in 1856.
