= Hilton Township, Iowa County, Iowa =

Township in Iowa County, Iowa, U.S.

Coordinates: 41.7361°N 92.0192°W

Hilton Township is a township in Iowa County, Iowa, United States.

Hilton Township was established in 1858.
