= Gustavus Detlef Hinrichs =

Chemist, natural philosopher (1836–1923)

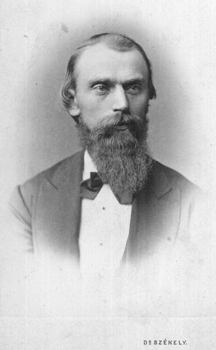
- Born: 2 December 1836; Lunden, Duchy of Holstein, German Confederation
- Died: 14 February 1923 (aged 86); St. Louis, Missouri, United States
- Education: University of Copenhagen
- Known for: periodic table of elements, derecho
- Scientific career
- Workplaces: State University of Iowa, St. Louis University

Gustavus Detlef Hinrichs (2 December 1836 – 14 February 1923) was a chemist and natural philosopher most widely known for his findings on periodic laws within the chemical elements. Born in the Duchy of Holstein, which at that time was under the rule of Denmark he emigrated to the United States in 1860 he became a professor of natural philosophy, chemistry, and modern languages at the University of Iowa. He was first to identify and name the straight-line storm phenomenon he called the "derecho", founded the Iowa Weather Service, the first state weather and crop service and described the Amana Meteorites from 1875 and 1879.

== Early life and education ==
Hinrichs was born in 1836 in Lunden (today in the district of Dithmarschen), then in the Duchy of Holstein, which at that time was under the rule of Denmark, although it was simultaneously part of the German Confederation. He attended the local polytechnic school and the University of Copenhagen. During his schooling he published several articles and books, including descriptions of the magnetic field of Earth and its interaction with the aether.

Hinrichs graduated in 1860, between the First and Second Schleswig Wars.

== Career ==
Hinrichs emigrated later that year to the United States, settling initially in Davenport, Iowa, where he taught school, then in nearby Iowa City.

In 1863, he was appointed a professor of natural philosophy, chemistry, and modern languages at the University of Iowa. He founded the first state weather and crop service in the United States and headed the Iowa Weather Service until 1886. He paid it out of his own pocket as neither university nor the Iowa Legislature would fund it.

He was first to identify and name the straight-line storm phenomenon he called the "derecho." He stayed at the University of Iowa for 23 years until 1886, when he was fired by the state Board of Regents due to disputes with the university president and faculty colleagues.

"Having gotten fed up with lack of support for and occasional hostility to both him and science" he moved to Missouri and in 1889, he became a professor of chemistry in the medical department at the St. Louis University. He taught there until his retirement in 1907, at age 71. In 1905, he published an 118-page booklet about the Amana Meteorites, where he had been first on site "with the regents of the university viewing the matter with indifference".

He died on 14 February 1923 in St Louis.

== Periodic law ==
Hinrichs is one of the discoverers of the periodic laws, which are the basis for the periodic table of elements. Although his contribution is not generally considered as important as those of Dmitri Mendeleev or Lothar Meyer, in 1867 (two years before Mendeleev) he presented his ideas on periodicity among the chemical elements in his privately printed book Programme der Atommechanik, and in slightly revised form in 1869. His first periodic table had the form of a double spiral, and the elements were placed into the structure according to their atomic mass. Hinrichs also postulated a theory on the cause of the periodicity within the chemical elements based on his theory of the composition of elements out of smaller Panatome. The Trigonoides were the nonmetals made from regular triangles, while the metallic Tetragonoides were made from squares. Algebraic formulas of how to mix squares and triangles yielded the periodic laws. His "controversial ideas and colorful personality" proved to be an obstacle to the acceptance of his theories.
