= Lincoln Township, Iowa County, Iowa =

Township in Iowa County, Iowa, U.S.

Coordinates: 41.6461°N 92.2447°W

Lincoln Township is a township in Iowa County, Iowa, United States.

== History ==
Lincoln Township was established in 1860.
