= York Township, Iowa County, Iowa =

Township in Iowa County, Iowa, U.S.

Coordinates: 41.6422°N 91.9006°W

York Township is a township in Iowa County, Iowa, United States.

== History ==
York Township was established in 1860.
