= Sumner Township, Iowa County, Iowa =

Township in Iowa County, Iowa, U.S.

Coordinates: 41.7244°N 92.1383°W

Sumner Township is a township in Iowa County, Iowa, United States.

Sumner Township was established in 1858.
