= English Township, Iowa County, Iowa =

Township in Iowa County, Iowa, U.S.

Coordinates: 41.5583°N 92.1286°W

English Township is a township in Iowa County, Iowa, United States.

English Township was established in 1847.
