= Amaná =

Coordinates: 30°04′S 67°31′W

- Municipality and village
- Interactive map of Amaná
- Country: Argentina
- Province: La Rioja Province
- Time zone: UTC−3 (ART)
- Climate: BWk

Amaná is a municipality and village in La Rioja Province in northwestern Argentina.
