= Yemeni Unity Cup =

Association football competition

The Unity Cup is an association football competition run by the Yemen Football Association (YFA). It initially started in the 1997-98 season and played for two years before being put on hold. The competition was added back to the Yemeni football calendar in 2004, again stopped but brought back in 2007 and has been played every season ever since.

== Finals ==
Season	Winner	Score	Runner-up
1997/98	Al-Wahda (San'a')	2-1	Al-Shula
1999	Al-Tilal	1-1 (5-3 penalties)	Al Ahli San'a'
2004	Al Ahli San'a'	5-1	Al-Hilal Al-Sahili
2007	FC May 22	1-0	Al-Saqr
2008	Al-Saqr	1-1 (7-6 penalties)	Al-Hilal Al-Sahili
2009	Al-Sha'ab Hadramaut	1-1 (4-2 penalties)	Al-Wahda (San'a')
2010	Al-Saqr	1-0	Shabab Al Baydaa
2011	Suspended due to political crisis
