= Amana Cup =

The Amana Cup was an association football competition run by the Yemen Football Association (YFA). It lasted for one season played as a round robin tournament which only featured clubs from San'a'.

Qadisiya (Sanaa) and Mithak (Sanaa) withdrew

Table:

1.May 22 (Sanaa)                 5   3  2  0  13- 5  11  Winners
2.Al-Wahda (Sanaa)               5   2  3  0  15- 4   9
3.Yarmuk (Sanaa)                 5   2  1  2  13- 9   7
4.Al-Ahly (Sanaa)                5   1  3  1  11-11   6
5.Al-Sha'ab (Sanaa)              5   0  3  2   4- 6   3
6.Al-Shurta (Sanaa)              5   0  2  3   4-25   2
