= East Amana, Iowa =

- Census-designated place
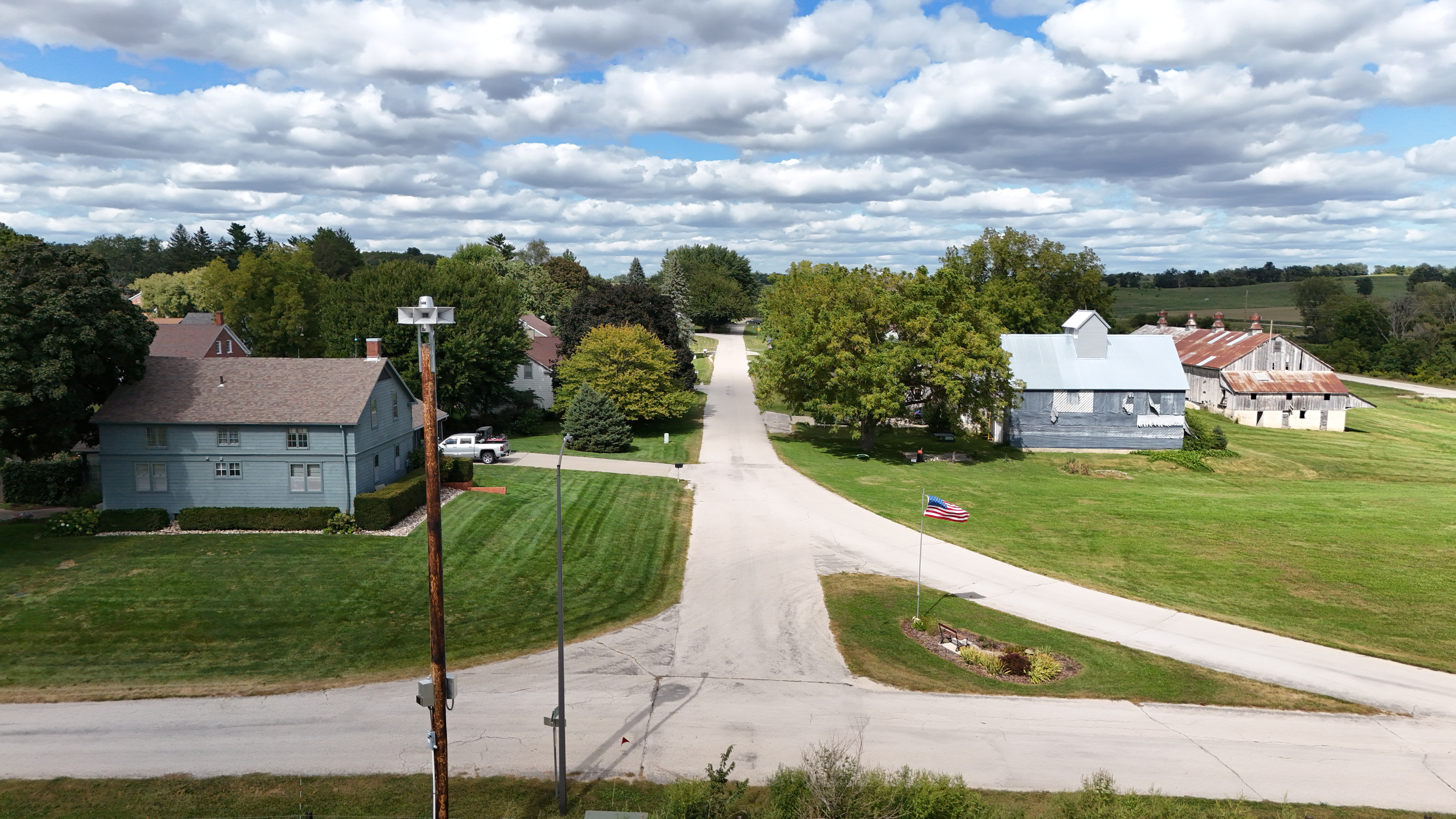
- The view down 53rd Ave. in East Amana, looking northeast

- Location within Iowa Location within the United States
- Coordinates: 41°48′31″N 91°51′10″W
- Country: United States
- State: Iowa
- County: Iowa

Area
  - Total: 0.37 sq mi (0.97 km^{2})
  - Land: 0.37 sq mi (0.97 km^{2})
  - Water: 0 sq mi (0.00 km^{2})
- Elevation: 745 ft (227 m)

Population (2020)
  - Total: 64
  - Density: 171.4/sq mi (66.16/km^{2})
- Time zone: UTC-6 (Central (CST))
  - Summer (DST): UTC-5 (CDT)
- ZIP code: 52203
- Area code: 319
- FIPS code: 19-23520
- GNIS feature ID: 2633312

East Amana is an unincorporated community and census-designated place (CDP) in Iowa County, Iowa, United States, and is part of the "seven villages" of the Amana Colonies. As of the 2020 Census, the population of East Amana was 64.

According to the website Statistical Atlas, all of the residents of East Amana speak German at home, and only 67.7% can speak English 'Very Well'.

== Geography ==
East Amana is in northeastern Iowa County, 1 mile (1.6 km) northeast of its neighbor village of Amana. It sits at the base of hills marking the northern edge of the Iowa River valley. According to the U.S. Census Bureau, the East Amana CDP has an area of 0.71 square miles (1.85 km^{2}), all land.

== Demographics ==
Historical population
Census	Pop.	Note	%±
2010	56		—
2020	64		14.3%
U.S. Decennial Census

=== 2020 census ===
As of the census of 2020, there were 64 people, 26 households, and 19 families residing in the community. The population density was 171.3 inhabitants per square mile (66.2/km^{2}). There were 32 housing units at an average density of 85.7 per square mile (33.1/km^{2}). The racial makeup of the community was 96.9% White, 0.0% Black or African American, 0.0% Native American, 0.0% Asian, 0.0% Pacific Islander, 0.0% from other races and 3.1% from two or more races. Hispanic or Latino persons of any race comprised 1.6% of the population.

Of the 26 households, 57.7% of which had children under the age of 18 living with them, 53.8% were married couples living together, 11.5% were cohabitating couples, 15.4% had a female householder with no spouse or partner present and 19.2% had a male householder with no spouse or partner present. 26.9% of all households were non-families. 19.2% of all households were made up of individuals, 0.0% had someone living alone who was 65 years old or older.

The median age in the community was 60.4 years. 23.4% of the residents were under the age of 20; 3.1% were between the ages of 20 and 24; 18.8% were from 25 and 44; 20.3% were from 45 and 64; and 34.4% were 65 years of age or older. The gender makeup of the community was 37.5% male and 62.5% female.

== History ==
In 1881, East Amana contained a blacksmith shop, carpenter shop, and barns in which sheep were kept.
