= Conroy, Iowa =

- Census-designated place
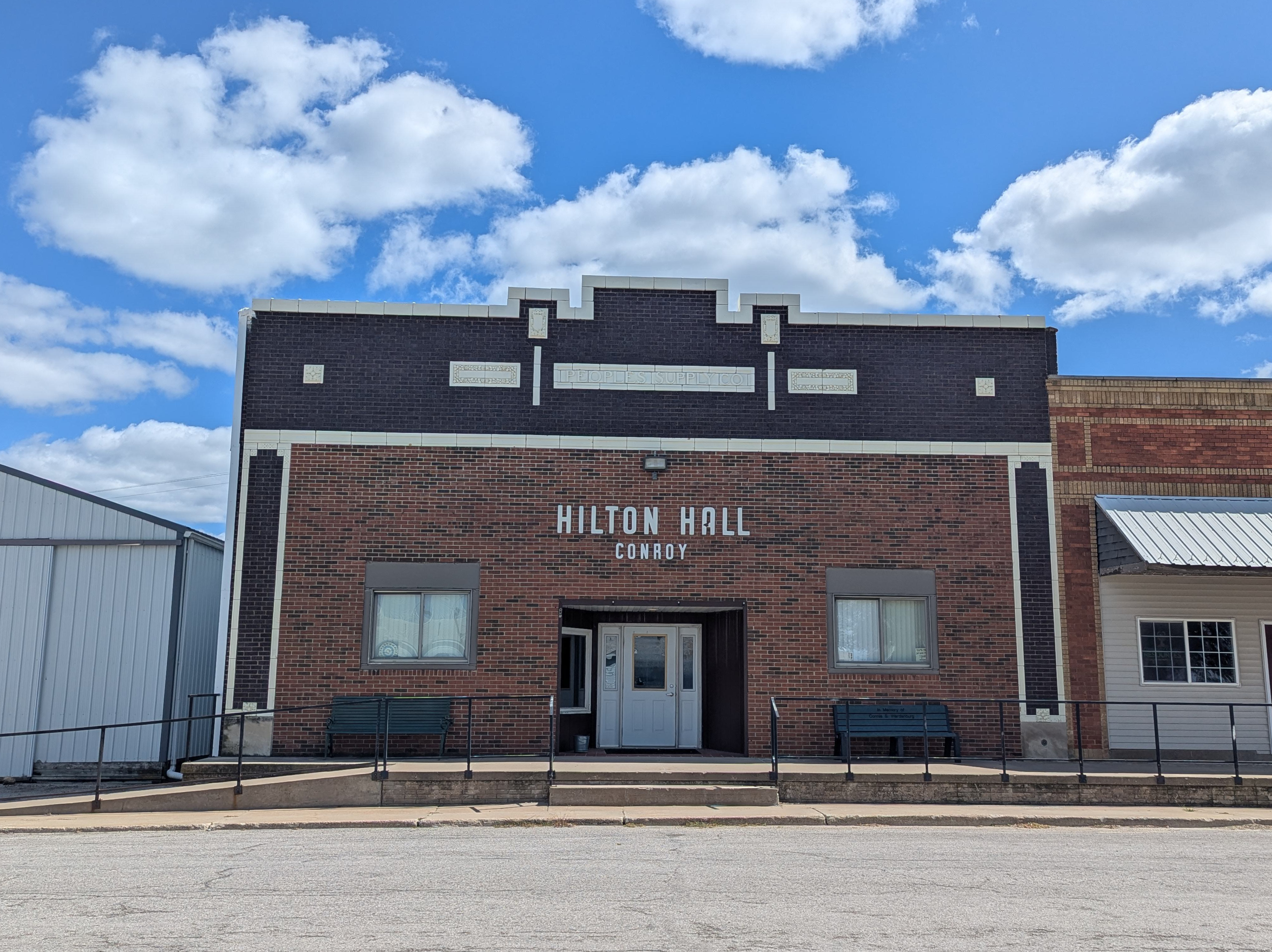
- Hilton (township) Hall in Conroy

- Location within Iowa Location within the United States
- Coordinates: 41°43′37″N 92°00′03″W
- Country: United States
- State: Iowa
- County: Iowa

Area
  - Total: 0.76 sq mi (1.97 km^{2})
  - Land: 0.76 sq mi (1.97 km^{2})
  - Water: 0 sq mi (0.00 km^{2})
- Elevation: 869 ft (265 m)

Population (2020)
  - Total: 252
  - Density: 330.6/sq mi (127.63/km^{2})
- Time zone: UTC-6 (Central (CST))
  - Summer (DST): UTC-5 (CDT)
- ZIP Code: 52220
- Area code: 319
- FIPS code: 19-15870
- GNIS feature ID: 2629961

Conroy is an unincorporated community and census-designated place (CDP) in central Iowa County, Iowa, United States. It lies along local roads southeast of the city of Marengo, the county seat of Iowa County. Its elevation is 879 feet (268 m). Conroy has a post office with the ZIP Code of 52220, which opened on 5 January 1885.

As of the 2020 census, Conroy had a population of 252.

== Demographics ==
Historical population
Census	Pop.	Note	%±
2010	259		—
2020	252		−2.7%
U.S. Decennial Census

=== 2020 census ===
As of the census of 2020, there were 252 people, 92 households, and 77 families residing in the community. The population density was 330.6 inhabitants per square mile (127.6/km^{2}). There were 98 housing units at an average density of 128.5 per square mile (49.6/km^{2}). The racial makeup of the community was 96.8% White, 1.2% Black or African American, 0.0% Native American, 0.0% Asian, 0.0% Pacific Islander, 0.0% from other races and 2.0% from two or more races. Hispanic or Latino persons of any race comprised 2.8% of the population.

Of the 92 households, 41.3% of which had children under the age of 18 living with them, 79.3% were married couples living together, 4.3% were cohabitating couples, 8.7% had a female householder with no spouse or partner present and 7.6% had a male householder with no spouse or partner present. 16.3% of all households were non-families. 14.1% of all households were made up of individuals, 4.3% had someone living alone who was 65 years old or older.

The median age in the community was 44.0 years. 26.2% of the residents were under the age of 20; 2.4% were between the ages of 20 and 24; 23.4% were from 25 and 44; 31.7% were from 45 and 64; and 16.3% were 65 years of age or older. The gender makeup of the community was 44.8% male and 55.2% female.

== History ==
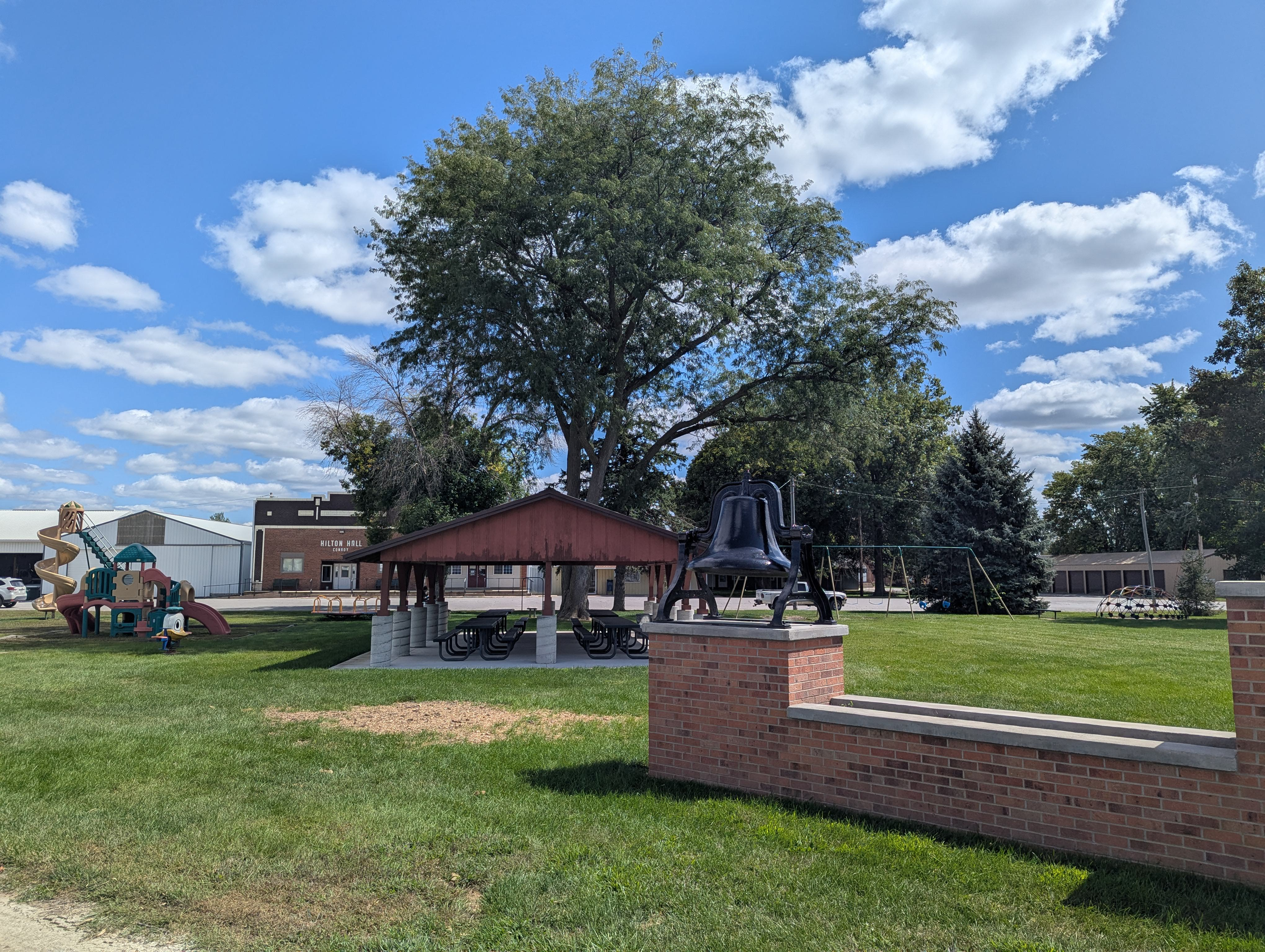
Conroy town park

Conroy's population was 12 in 1902, and 100 in 1925. The population was 160 in 1940.

== Notable people ==
- Quentin Stanerson (born 1977), member of the Iowa House of Representatives

== See also ==
- Plagmann Round Barn, listed on the National Register of Historic Places
