= Middle Amana, Iowa =

- Census-designated place
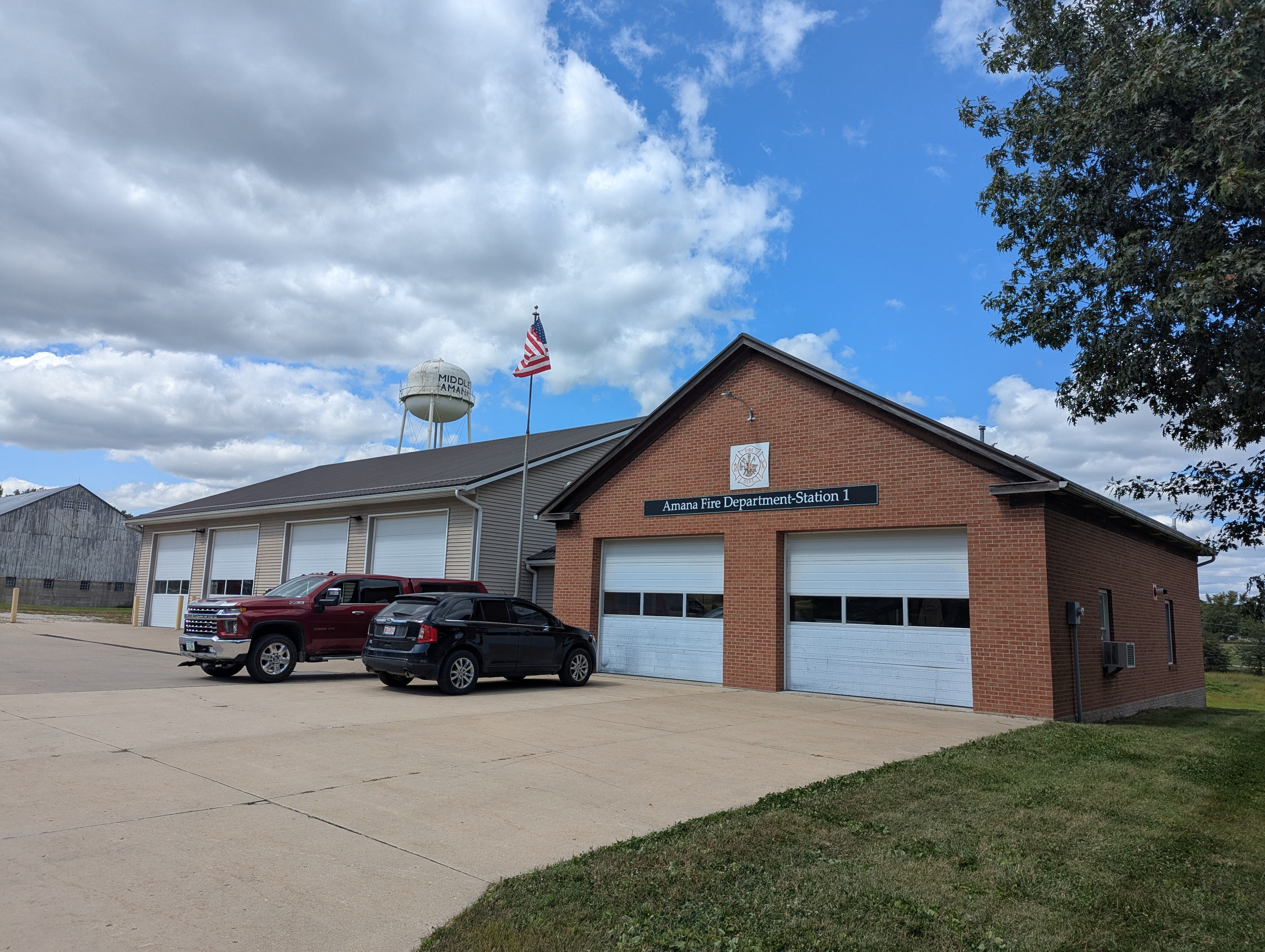
- Fire department and water tower

- Location within Iowa Location within the United States
- Coordinates: 41°47′41″N 91°54′06″W
- Country: United States
- State: Iowa
- County: Iowa

Area
  - Total: 0.97 sq mi (2.52 km^{2})
  - Land: 0.97 sq mi (2.52 km^{2})
  - Water: 0 sq mi (0.00 km^{2})
- Elevation: 755 ft (230 m)

Population (2020)
  - Total: 543
  - Density: 558.6/sq mi (215.66/km^{2})
- Time zone: UTC−6 (Central (CST))
  - Summer (DST): UTC−5 (CDT)
- ZIP Code: 52307
- FIPS code: 19-51600
- GNIS feature ID: 2629970

Middle Amana is an unincorporated community and census-designated place (CDP) in Iowa County, Iowa, United States. It is the largest of the seven villages of the Amana Colonies, all designated as a National Historic Landmark. As of the 2020 Census, the population of Middle Amana was 543.

== Geography ==
Middle Amana is in northeastern Iowa County, on the north side of the valley of the Iowa River. It is 1.5 miles (2.4 km) west of Amana and 2 miles (3 km) east of High Amana. According to the U.S. Census Bureau, the Middle Amana CDP has an area of 1.0 square mile (2.7 km^{2}), all land.

== Demographics ==
Historical population
Census	Pop.	Note	%±
2010	581		—
2020	543		−6.5%
U.S. Decennial Census

=== 2020 census ===
As of the census of 2020, there were 543 people, 235 households, and 146 families residing in the community. The population density was 558.6 inhabitants per square mile (215.7/km^{2}). There were 255 housing units at an average density of 262.3 per square mile (101.3/km^{2}). The racial makeup of the community was 97.6% White, 0.4% Black or African American, 0.0% Native American, 0.7% Asian, 0.0% Pacific Islander, 0.0% from other races and 1.3% from two or more races. Hispanic or Latino persons of any race comprised 0.6% of the population.

Of the 235 households, 24.7% of which had children under the age of 18 living with them, 54.5% were married couples living together, 3.8% were cohabitating couples, 23.4% had a female householder with no spouse or partner present and 18.3% had a male householder with no spouse or partner present. 37.9% of all households were non-families. 31.9% of all households were made up of individuals, 18.7% had someone living alone who was 65 years old or older.

The median age in the community was 57.6 years. 15.8% of the residents were under the age of 20; 3.9% were between the ages of 20 and 24; 14.4% were from 25 and 44; 31.7% were from 45 and 64; and 34.3% were 65 years of age or older. The gender makeup of the community was 46.4% male and 53.6% female.

== History ==
In 1881, Middle Amana contained a woolen mill, starch factory, machine shop, wagon shop, blacksmith shop, book printing and bindery, brick yard, general store, school, and meeting house.

== Education ==
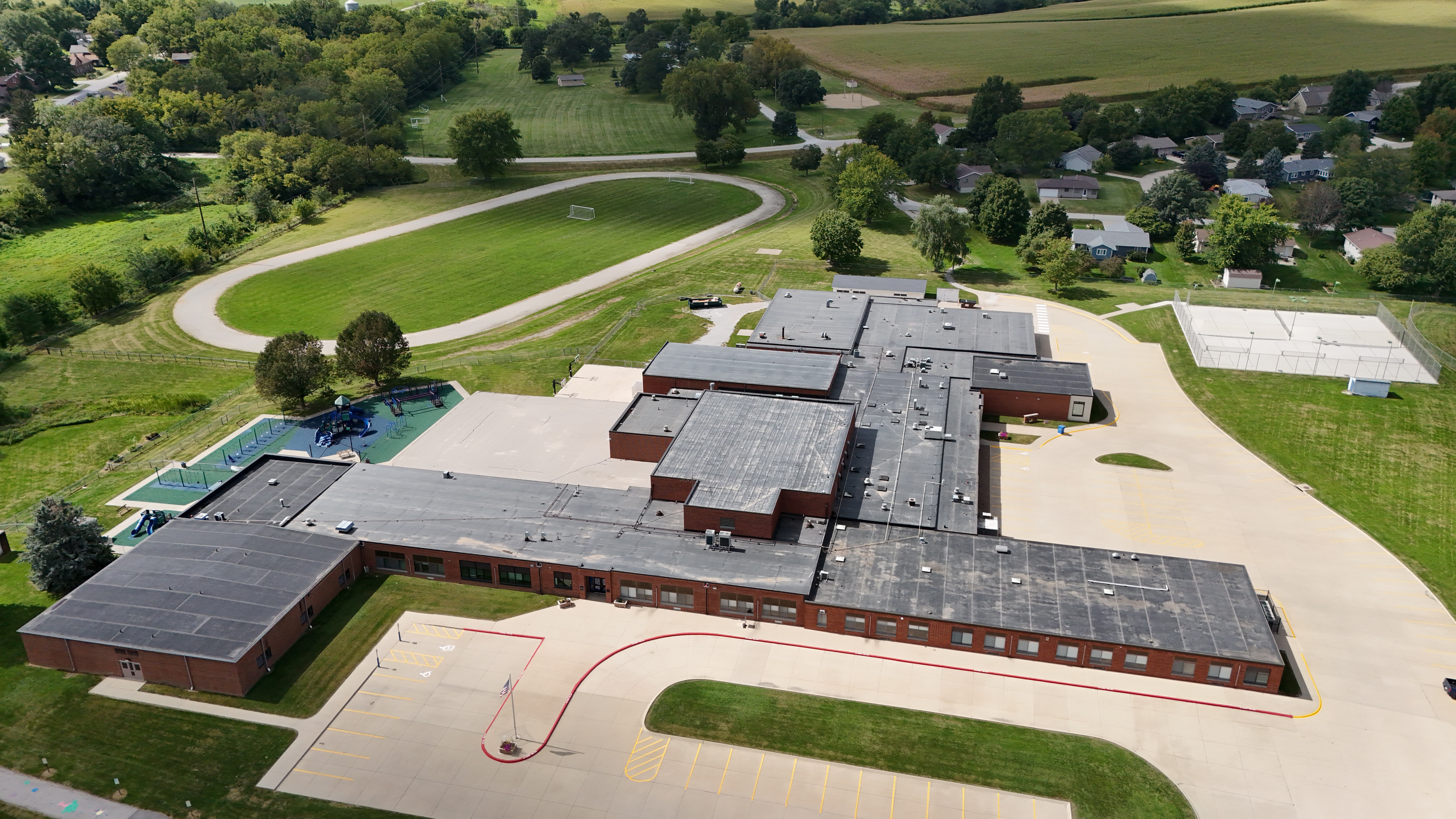
Amana Elementary School in Middle Amana

Clear Creek–Amana Community School District operates public schools serving the community. Amana Elementary School is in Middle Amana, and Clear Creek–Amana Middle School and Clear Creek–Amana High School are in Tiffin.

Amana High School in Middle Amana was established after a 1935 bond election. The school closed in 1991.

Clear Creek–Amana Middle School was previously in Middle Amana.

== Notable person ==
- Bill Zuber, baseball player and restaurateur
