= Iowa County, Iowa =

County in Iowa, United States

- County
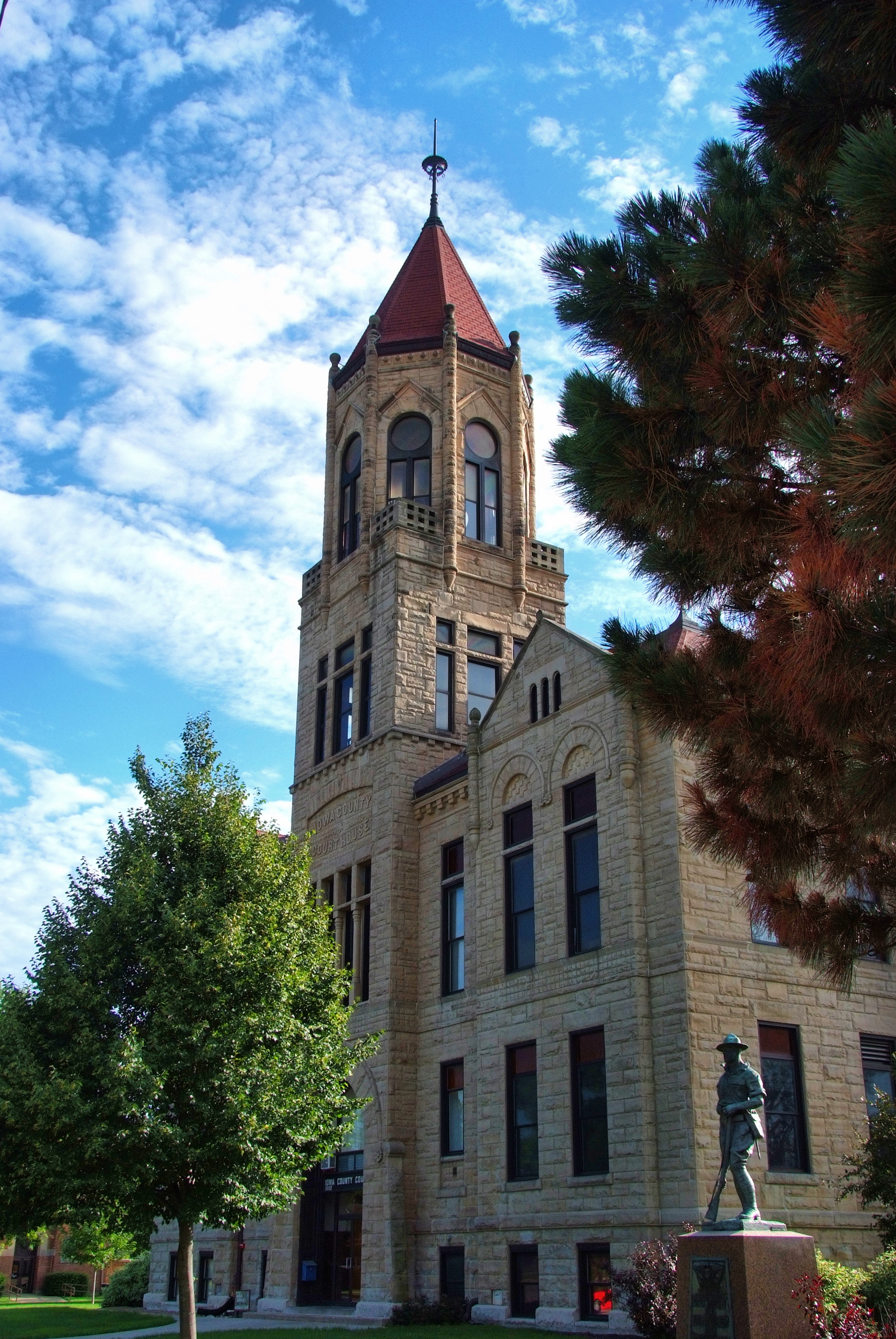
- The Iowa County Courthouse in Marengo

- Location within the U.S. state of Iowa
- Coordinates: 41.683918°N 92.059123°W
- Country: United States
- State: Iowa
- Founded: February 17, 1843 (created); July 1, 1845 (organized)
- Named for: Iowa River
- Seat: Marengo
- Largest city: Williamsburg

Area
  - Total: 587.492 sq mi (1,521.60 km^{2})
  - Land: 586.455 sq mi (1,518.91 km^{2})
  - Water: 1.037 sq mi (2.69 km^{2}) 0.18%

Population (2020)
  - Total: 16,662
  - Estimate (2025): 16,504 ▼
  - Density: 28.411/sq mi (10.970/km^{2})
- Time zone: UTC−6 (Central)
  - Summer (DST): UTC−5 (CDT)
- Area code: 319
- Congressional district: 1st
- Website: iowacounty.iowa.gov
- Iowa county number 48

Iowa County is a county in the U.S. state of Iowa. As of the 2020 census, the population was 16,662, and was estimated to be 16,504 in 2025. The county seat is Marengo and the largest city is Williamsburg. Iowa County is one of seven counties in the United States to share the same name as the state in which they are located. The other six counties are Arkansas County, Hawaii County, Idaho County, New York County, Oklahoma County, and Utah County.

== History ==
Iowa County was formed on February 17, 1843. It was named for the Iowa River, which flows through the county. The first courthouse was a log cabin built in 1847. It was rented by the county until 1850 when a second courthouse was completed. In 1861 construction of a third courthouse was begun. The current courthouse was built in 1892 after the county had outgrown the previous one.

Iowa County is home to the Amana Colonies, a group of settlements of German Pietists comprising seven villages. Calling themselves the Ebenezer Society or the Community of True Inspiration (German: die Gemeinde der wahren Inspiration), they first settled in New York state near Buffalo in what is now West Seneca. However, in order to live out their beliefs in more isolated surroundings they moved west, to Iowa County in 1855, living a communal life until the mid-1930s. Today, Amana is a major tourist attraction known mainly for its restaurants and craft shops, and the colonies as a whole have been listed as a National Historic Landmark since 1965.

== Geography ==
According to the United States Census Bureau, the county has a total area of 587.492 square miles (1,521.60 km^{2}), of which 586.455 square miles (1,518.91 km^{2}) is land and 1.037 square miles (2.69 km^{2}) (0.18%) is water. It is the 26th largest county in Iowa by total area. The county is intersected by the Iowa River and the north fork of the English River.

=== Major highways ===
- Interstate 80
- U.S. Highway 6
- U.S. Highway 151
- Iowa Highway 21
- Iowa Highway 149
- Iowa Highway 220
- Iowa Highway 212

=== Adjacent counties ===
- Benton County (north)
- Linn County (northeast)
- Johnson County (east)
- Washington County (southeast)
- Keokuk County (south)
- Poweshiek County (west)
- Tama County (northwest)

== Demographics ==
Historical population
Census	Pop.	Note	%±
1850	822		—
1860	8,029		876.8%
1870	16,644		107.3%
1880	19,221		15.5%
1890	18,270		−4.9%
1900	19,544		7.0%
1910	18,409		−5.8%
1920	18,600		1.0%
1930	17,332		−6.8%
1940	17,016		−1.8%
1950	15,835		−6.9%
1960	16,396		3.5%
1970	15,419		−6.0%
1980	15,429		0.1%
1990	14,630		−5.2%
2000	15,671		7.1%
2010	16,355		4.4%
2020	16,662		1.9%
2025 (est.)	16,504	▼	−0.9%
U.S. Decennial Census; 1790–1960 1900–1990; 1990–2000 2010–2020

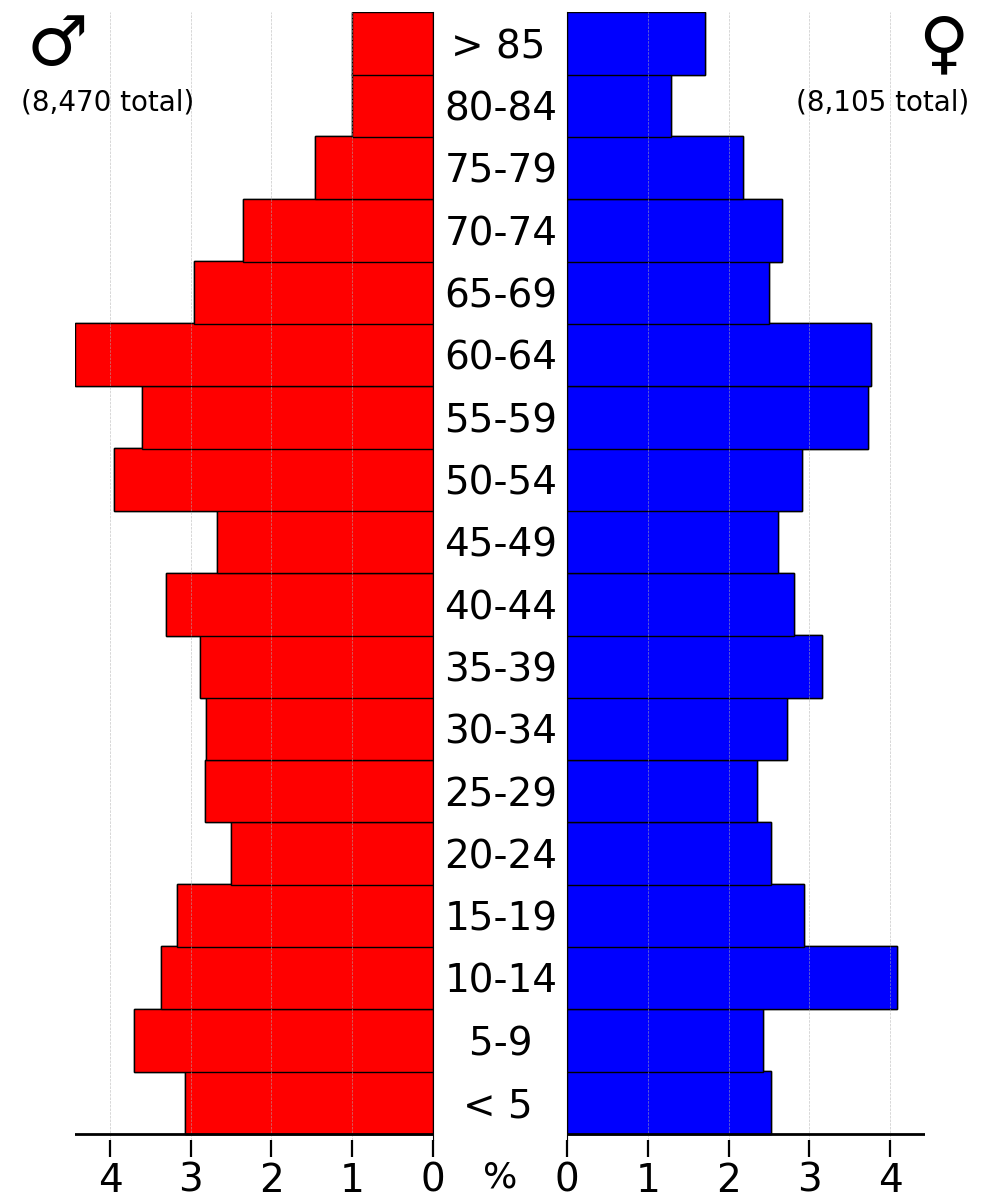
A 2022 US Census population pyramid for Iowa County from ACS 5-year estimates

As of the second quarter of 2025, the median home value in Iowa County was $213,544.

As of the 2024 American Community Survey, there are 6,909 estimated households in Iowa County with an average of 2.34 persons per household. The county has a median household income of $71,223. Approximately 8.9% of the county's population lives at or below the poverty line. Iowa County has an estimated 65.3% employment rate, with 24.8% of the population holding a bachelor's degree or higher and 95.5% holding a high school diploma. There were 7,369 housing units at an average density of 12.57 per square mile (4.9/km^{2}).

The top five reported languages (people were allowed to report up to two languages, thus the figures will generally add to more than 100%) were English (97.3%), Spanish (1.4%), Indo-European (0.7%), Asian and Pacific Islander (0.5%), and Other (0.1%).

The median age in the county was 42.4 years.

Iowa County, Iowa – racial and ethnic composition Note: the US Census treats Hispanic/Latino as an ethnic category. This table excludes Latinos from the racial categories and assigns them to a separate category. Hispanics/Latinos may be of any race.
Race / ethnicity (NH = non-Hispanic)	Pop. 1980	Pop. 1990	Pop. 2000	Pop. 2010	Pop. 2020
White alone (NH)	15,305 (99.20%)	14,539 (99.38%)	15,390 (98.21%)	15,818 (96.72%)	15,394 (92.39%)
Black or African American alone (NH)	4 (0.03%)	7 (0.05%)	25 (0.16%)	53 (0.32%)	111 (0.67%)
Native American or Alaska Native alone (NH)	7 (0.05%)	10 (0.07%)	10 (0.06%)	14 (0.09%)	29 (0.17%)
Asian alone (NH)	38 (0.25%)	34 (0.23%)	47 (0.30%)	54 (0.33%)	84 (0.50%)
Pacific Islander alone (NH)	—	—	3 (0.02%)	2 (0.01%)	1 (0.01%)
Other race alone (NH)	33 (0.21%)	1 (0.01%)	4 (0.03%)	9 (0.06%)	57 (0.34%)
Mixed race or multiracial (NH)	—	—	40 (0.26%)	98 (0.60%)	491 (2.95%)
Hispanic or Latino (any race)	42 (0.27%)	39 (0.27%)	152 (0.97%)	307 (1.88%)	495 (2.97%)
Total	15,429 (100.00%)	14,630 (100.00%)	15,671 (100.00%)	16,355 (100.00%)	16,662 (100.00%)

=== 2020 census ===
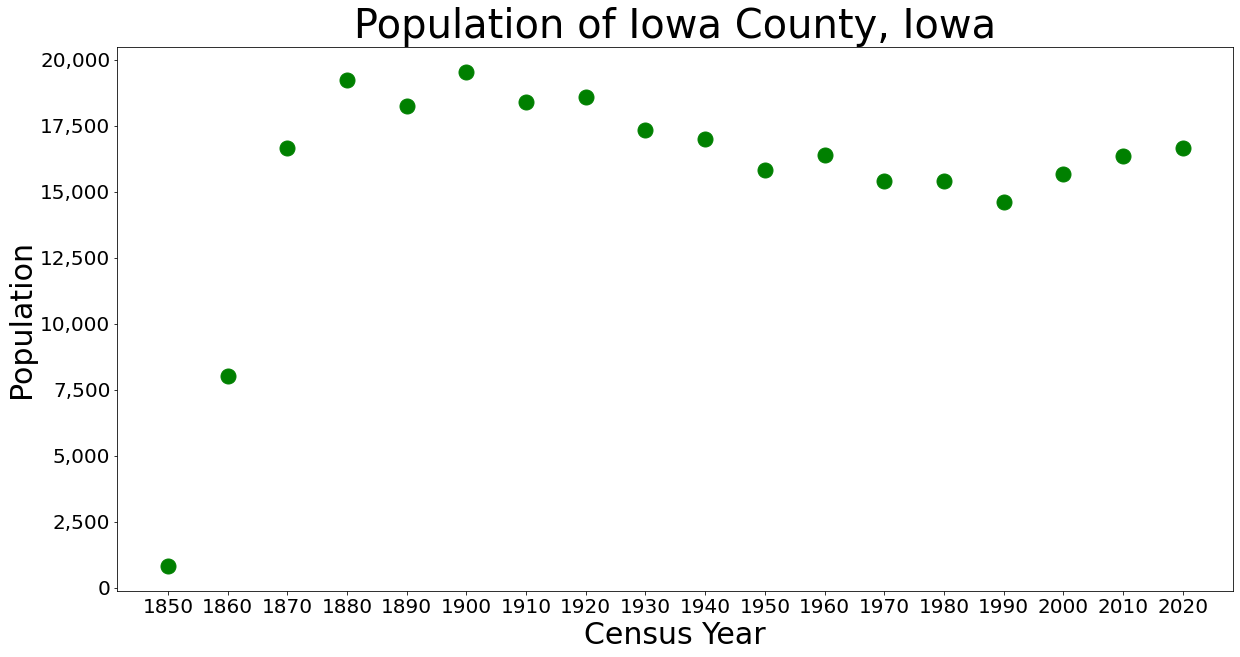
Population of Iowa County from the U.S. census data

As of the 2020 census, there were 16,662 people, 6,811 households, and 4,509 families residing in the county. The population density was 28.41 inhabitants per square mile (11.0/km^{2}). There were 7,341 housing units at an average density of 12.52 per square mile (4.8/km^{2}). The racial makeup of the county was 93.45% White, 0.67% African American, 0.21% Native American, 0.56% Asian, 0.01% Pacific Islander, 1.34% from some other races and 3.76% from two or more races. Hispanic or Latino people of any race were 2.97% of the population.

And 96.24% of residents reported being of one race. The median age was 42.6 years; 23.4% of residents were under the age of 18 and 19.8% were 65 years of age or older. For every 100 females there were 98.8 males, and for every 100 females age 18 and over there were 95.9 males age 18 and over.

<0.1% of residents lived in urban areas, while 100.0% lived in rural areas.

There were 6,811 households in the county, of which 28.9% had children under the age of 18 living in them. Of all households, 55.3% were married-couple households, 16.9% were households with a male householder and no spouse or partner present, and 21.6% were households with a female householder and no spouse or partner present. About 28.7% of all households were made up of individuals and 13.7% had someone living alone who was 65 years of age or older.

There were 7,341 housing units, of which 6,811 were occupied; 7.2% were vacant. Among occupied housing units, 79.1% were owner-occupied and 20.9% were renter-occupied. The homeowner vacancy rate was 1.5% and the rental vacancy rate was 8.6%.

=== 2010 census ===
As of the 2010 census, there were 16,355 people, 6,677 households, and _ families residing in the county. The population density was 27.89 inhabitants per square mile (10.8/km^{2}). There were 7,258 housing units at an average density of 12.38 per square mile (4.8/km^{2}). The racial makeup of the county was 97.84% White, 0.35% African American, 0.17% Native American, 0.34% Asian, 0.01% Pacific Islander, 0.54% from some other races and 0.75% from two or more races. Hispanic or Latino people of any race were 1.88% of the population.

=== 2000 census ===
As of the 2000 census, there were 15,671 people, 6,163 households, and 4,301 families residing in the county. The population density was 26.72 inhabitants per square mile (10.3/km^{2}). There were 6,545 housing units at an average density of 11.16 per square mile (4.3/km^{2}). The racial makeup of the county was 98.70% White, 0.17% African American, 0.06% Native American, 0.30% Asian, 0.03% Pacific Islander, 0.36% from some other races and 0.38% from two or more races. Hispanic or Latino people of any race were 0.97% of the population.

There were 6,163 households, out of which 32.80% had children under the age of 18 living with them, 60.10% were married couples living together, 6.60% had a female householder with no husband present, and 30.20% were non-families. 25.90% of all households were made up of individuals, and 12.50% had someone living alone who was 65 years of age or older. The average household size was 2.50 and the average family size was 3.03. In the county the population was spread out, with 26.40% under the age of 18, 6.30% from 18 to 24, 27.80% from 25 to 44, 22.40% from 45 to 64, and 17.10% who were 65 years of age or older. The median age was 39 years. For every 100 females there were 95.00 males. For every 100 females age 18 and over, there were 93.20 males.

The median income for a household in the county was $41,222, and the median income for a family was $48,946. Males had a median income of $31,220 versus $24,652 for females. The per capita income for the county was $18,884. About 3.40% of families and 5.00% of the population were below the poverty line, including 4.50% of those under age 18 and 5.40% of those age 65 or over.

== Politics ==
In the 2008 US presidential election, a nearly equal number of Iowa County voters voted for each major candidate, with Barack Obama winning the county by a narrow margin of 14 votes.

In the 2012 US presidential election, Mitt Romney received 4,551 votes (51.8%). In the 2016 US presidential election, Donald Trump received 5,193 votes (59.1%). In the 2020 US presidential election, Donald Trump received 6,009 votes (61.8%). In the 2024 US presidential election, Donald Trump received 6,068 votes (63.0%).

United States presidential election results for Iowa County, Iowa
Year	Republican		Democratic		Third party(ies)	
Year	No.	%	No.	%	No.	%
1896	2,391	53.78%	1,956	43.99%	99	2.23%
1900	2,336	52.70%	1,983	44.73%	114	2.57%
1904	2,303	52.81%	1,891	43.36%	167	3.83%
1908	2,230	52.58%	1,907	44.97%	104	2.45%
1912	1,237	30.76%	1,841	45.77%	944	23.47%
1916	2,484	57.90%	1,763	41.10%	43	1.00%
1920	4,892	69.92%	2,019	28.86%	86	1.23%
1924	3,549	51.91%	1,458	21.33%	1,830	26.77%
1928	4,091	56.85%	3,075	42.73%	30	0.42%
1932	2,628	35.04%	4,376	58.35%	495	6.60%
1936	3,360	43.57%	4,163	53.98%	189	2.45%
1940	4,696	55.33%	3,649	42.99%	143	1.68%
1944	3,959	53.94%	3,119	42.49%	262	3.57%
1948	3,659	52.44%	3,030	43.42%	289	4.14%
1952	5,625	67.27%	2,514	30.06%	223	2.67%
1956	4,875	62.68%	2,753	35.40%	149	1.92%
1960	4,944	63.47%	2,828	36.30%	18	0.23%
1964	2,828	39.82%	4,261	60.00%	13	0.18%
1968	4,133	58.12%	2,586	36.37%	392	5.51%
1972	4,202	60.34%	2,578	37.02%	184	2.64%
1976	3,926	52.98%	3,367	45.43%	118	1.59%
1980	4,153	55.21%	2,606	34.65%	763	10.14%
1984	4,352	60.02%	2,815	38.82%	84	1.16%
1988	3,247	48.57%	3,338	49.93%	100	1.50%
1992	2,656	38.13%	2,560	36.76%	1,749	25.11%
1996	3,042	43.24%	3,354	47.68%	639	9.08%
2000	3,894	52.53%	3,230	43.57%	289	3.90%
2004	4,544	53.75%	3,841	45.43%	69	0.82%
2008	4,188	48.99%	4,202	49.16%	158	1.85%
2012	4,569	51.53%	4,144	46.74%	153	1.73%
2016	5,205	58.46%	3,084	34.64%	615	6.91%
2020	6,009	61.68%	3,547	36.41%	186	1.91%
2024	6,068	62.95%	3,400	35.27%	171	1.77%

== Communities ==
=== Cities ===
- Ladora
- Marengo
- Millersburg
- North English
- Parnell
- Victor
- Williamsburg

=== Census-designated places ===
- Amana
- Conroy
- East Amana
- High Amana
- Homestead
- Middle Amana
- South Amana
- West Amana

=== Other unincorporated communities ===
- Ambrose
- Armah
- Genoa Bluff
- Holbrook
- Koszta
- Upper South Amana

=== Townships ===
- English
- Greene
- Hartford
- Hilton
- Iowa
- Lenox
- Lincoln
- Marengo
- Pilot
- Sumner
- Troy
- Washington
- York

=== Population ranking ===
Population rankings based on the 2020 census of Iowa County:

† county seat

Rank	City/Town/etc.	Municipal type	Population (2020 Census)	Population (2024 Estimate)
1	Williamsburg	City	3,346	3,380
2	† Marengo	City	2,435	2,415
3	North English (partially in Keokuk County)	City	1,065	1,089
4	Victor (partially in Poweshiek County)	City	875	872
5	Middle Amana	CDP	543	739
6	Amana	CDP	388	650
7	Conroy	CDP	252	273
8	Ladora	City	229	223
9	Parnell	City	194	196
10	South Amana	CDP	165	175
11	Homestead	CDP	135	168
12	Millersburg	City	135	148
13	West Amana	CDP	140	145
14	High Amana	CDP	113	123
15	East Amana	CDP	64	73

== Education ==
School districts include:

- Belle Plaine Community School District, Belle Plaine
- Benton Community School District, Van Horne
- Clear Creek–Amana Community School District, Oxford
- English Valleys Community School District, North English
- H-L-V Community School District, Victor
- Iowa Valley Community School District, Marengo
- Mid-Prairie Community School District, Wellman
- Tri-County Community School District, Thornburg
- Williamsburg Community School District, Williamsburg

== See also ==
- National Register of Historic Places listings in Iowa County, Iowa
