= High Amana, Iowa =

- Census-designated place
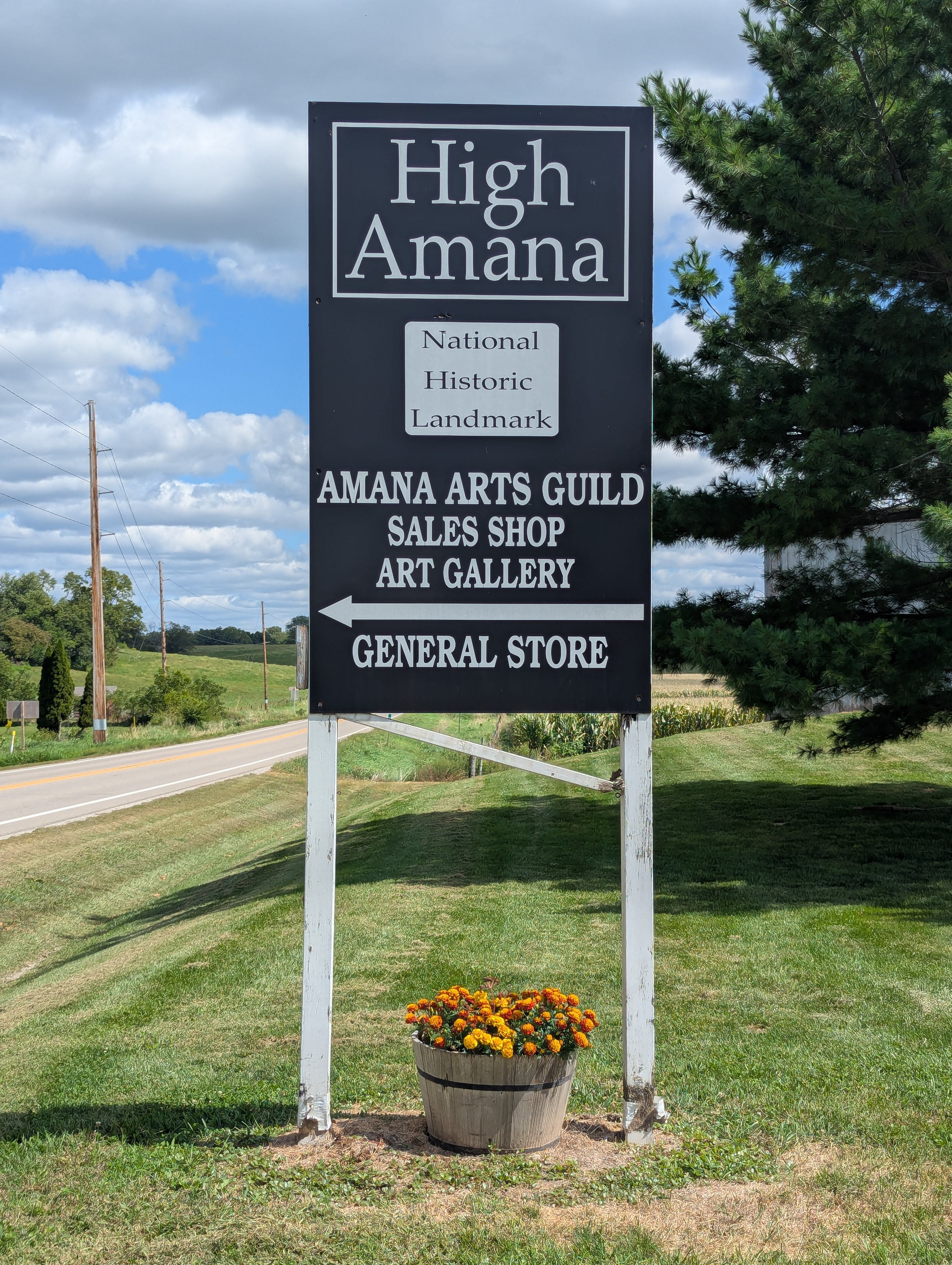
- Welcome Sign in High Amana

- Location within Iowa Location within the United States
- Coordinates: 41°48′04″N 91°56′31″W
- Country: United States
- State: Iowa
- County: Iowa

Area
  - Total: 0.38 sq mi (0.99 km^{2})
  - Land: 0.38 sq mi (0.99 km^{2})
  - Water: 0 sq mi (0.00 km^{2})
- Elevation: 728 ft (222 m)

Population (2020)
  - Total: 113
  - Density: 295.1/sq mi (113.94/km^{2})
- Time zone: UTC-6 (Central (CST))
  - Summer (DST): UTC-5 (CDT)
- ZIP code: 52203
- Area code: 319
- FIPS code: 19-36030
- GNIS feature ID: 2629967

High Amana is an unincorporated community and census-designated place (CDP) in Iowa County, Iowa, United States, and is part of the "seven villages" of the Amana Colonies. As of the 2020 Census, the population of High Amana was 113.

== Geography ==
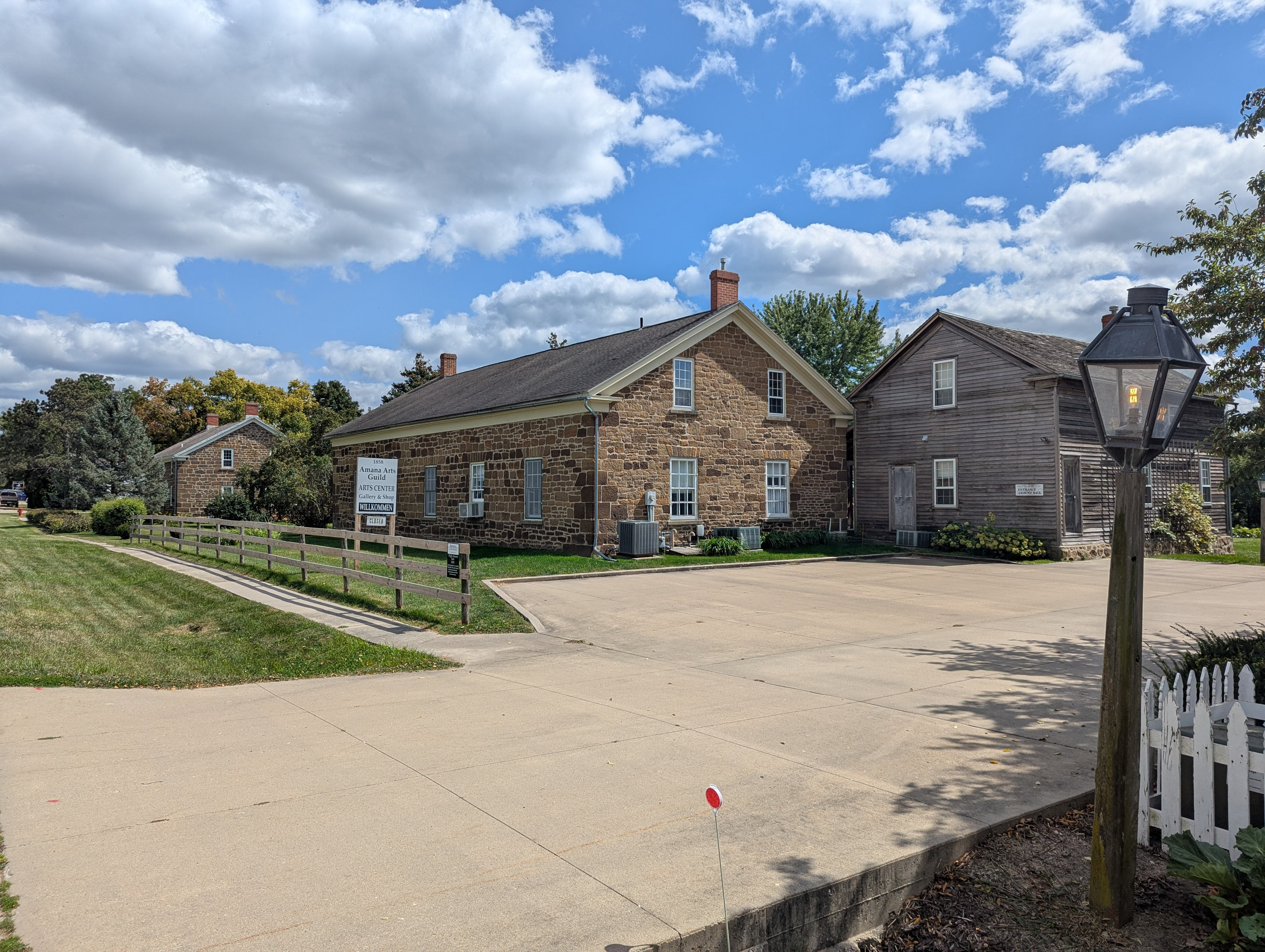
Amana Arts Guild building in High Amana

High Amana is in northeastern Iowa County, 2 miles (3 km) west of Middle Amana and 1.5 miles (2.4 km) east of West Amana. It sits at the northern edge of the valley of the Iowa River. According to the U.S. Census Bureau, the High Amana CDP has an area of 0.39 square miles (1.00 km^{2}), all land.

== Demographics ==
Historical population
Census	Pop.	Note	%±
2010	115		—
2020	113		−1.7%
U.S. Decennial Census

=== 2020 census ===
As of the census of 2020, there were 113 people, 49 households, and 18 families residing in the community. The population density was 295.1 inhabitants per square mile (113.9/km^{2}). There were 50 housing units at an average density of 130.6 per square mile (50.4/km^{2}). The racial makeup of the community was 95.6% White, 0.0% Black or African American, 0.0% Native American, 0.9% Asian, 0.0% Pacific Islander, 0.0% from other races and 3.5% from two or more races. Hispanic or Latino persons of any race comprised 1.8% of the population.

Of the 49 households, 8.2% of which had children under the age of 18 living with them, 36.7% were married couples living together, 14.3% were cohabitating couples, 28.6% had a female householder with no spouse or partner present and 20.4% had a male householder with no spouse or partner present. 63.3% of all households were non-families. 49.0% of all households were made up of individuals, 18.4% had someone living alone who was 65 years old or older.

The median age in the community was 43.1 years. 23.9% of the residents were under the age of 20; 12.4% were between the ages of 20 and 24; 17.7% were from 25 and 44; 36.3% were from 45 and 64; and 9.7% were 65 years of age or older. The gender makeup of the community was 45.1% male and 54.9% female.

== History ==
This community was originally known as Hoch-Amana, German for "High Amana", also inflected as Hohe-Amana. Its full name was Amana vor der Höhe, lit. 'Amana in front of the height/hill'.

In 1881, High Amana contained a general store, sawmill, machine shop, and a blacksmith shop.
