= Homestead, Iowa =

Census-designated place in Iowa, United States

- Census-designated place
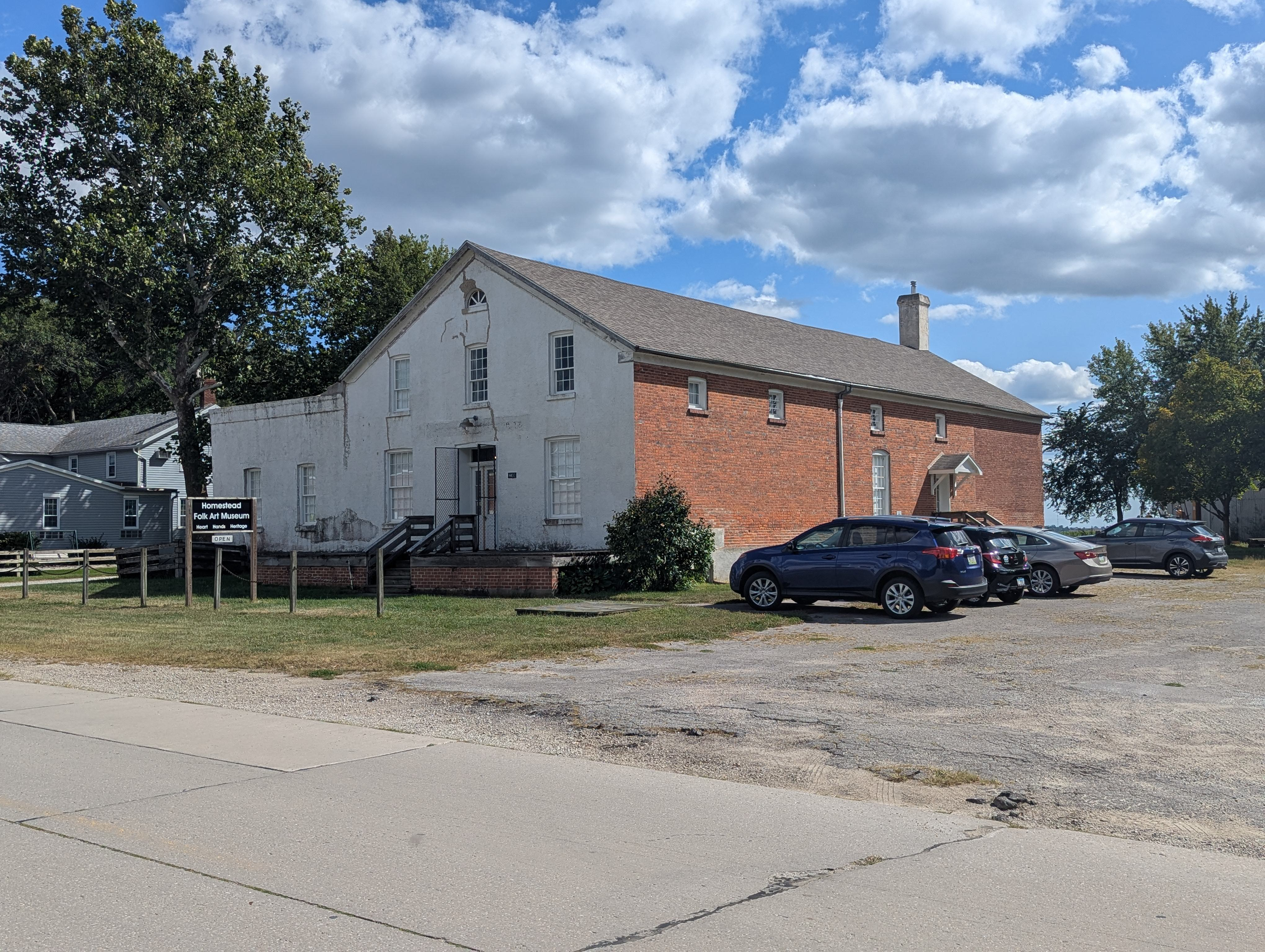
- Homestead Folk Art Museum

- Location within Iowa Location within the United States
- Coordinates: 41°45′38″N 91°52′32″W
- Country: United States
- State: Iowa
- County: Iowa

Area
  - Total: 1.30 sq mi (3.37 km^{2})
  - Land: 1.30 sq mi (3.37 km^{2})
  - Water: 0 sq mi (0.00 km^{2})
- Elevation: 853 ft (260 m)

Population (2020)
  - Total: 135
  - Density: 103.7/sq mi (40.03/km^{2})
- Time zone: UTC-6 (Central (CST))
  - Summer (DST): UTC-5 (CDT)
- ZIP code: 52236
- FIPS code: 19-36975
- GNIS feature ID: 2633313

Homestead is an unincorporated community and census-designated place (CDP) in Iowa County, Iowa, United States. It is one of the seven villages of the Amana Colonies. The population was recorded as 135 during the 2020 census.

== Geography ==
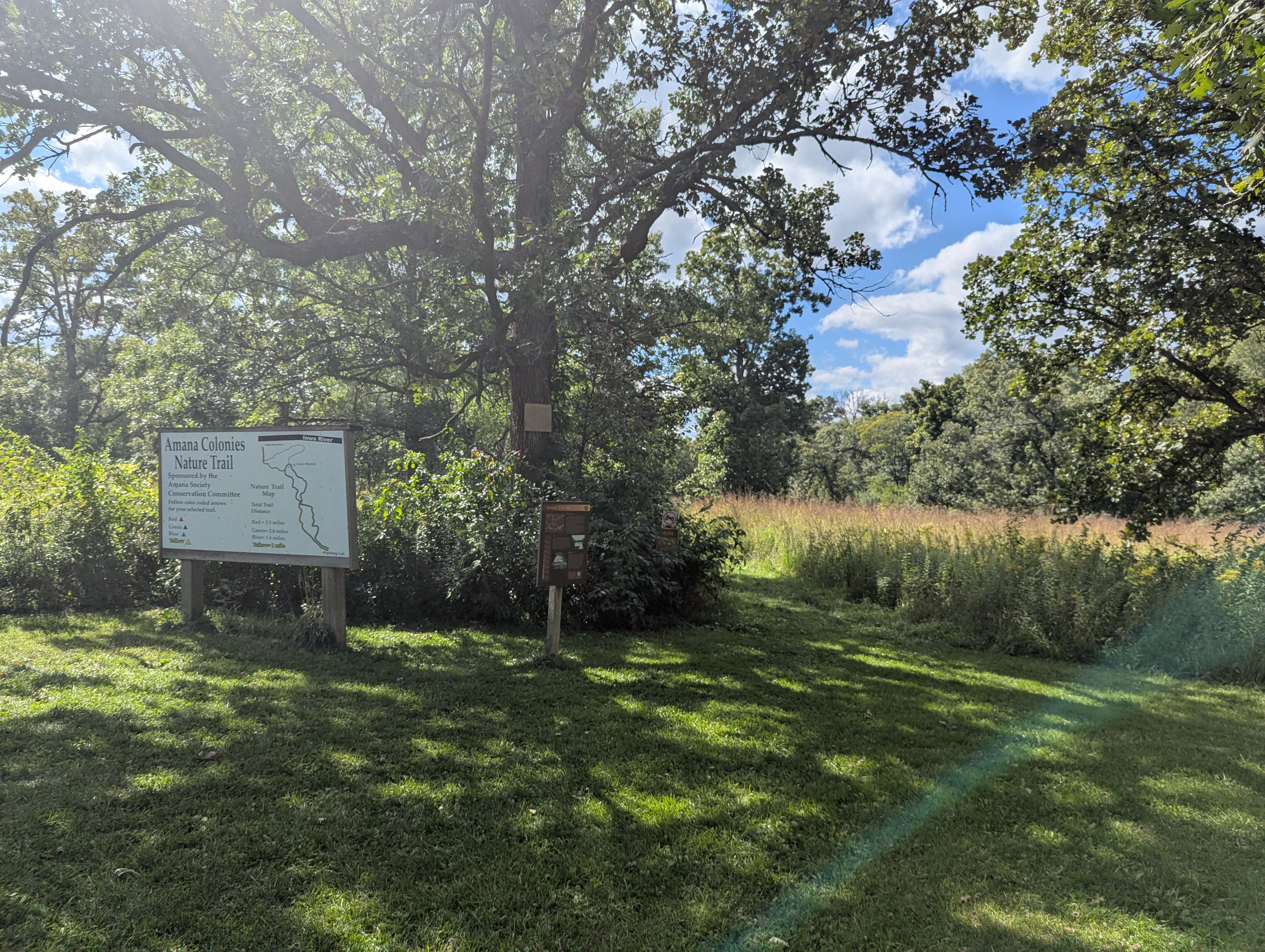
The trailhead for the Amana Colonies Nature Trail is in Homestead

Homestead is in northeastern Iowa County at the junction of U.S. Route 151 with U.S. Route 6. US 151 leads northeast 22 miles (35 km) to Cedar Rapids and west, then south 7 miles (11 km) to Interstate 80, while US 6 leads east 19 miles (31 km) to Iowa City and west 11 miles (18 km) to Marengo, the Iowa County seat. Amana is 3.5 miles (5.6 km) north of Homestead along US 151.

According to the U.S. Census Bureau, the Homestead CDP has an area of 1.7 square miles (4.4 km^{2}), all land.

== Demographics ==
Historical population
Census	Pop.	Note	%±
2010	148		—
2020	135		−8.8%
U.S. Decennial Census

=== 2020 census ===
The 2020 United States census counted 135 people, 56 households, and 49 families in Homestead. The population density was 103.7 per square mile (40.0/km^{2}). There were 64 housing units at an average density of 49.2 per square mile (19.0/km^{2}). The racial makeup was 97.78% (132) white or European American (97.04% non-Hispanic white), 0.0% (0) black or African-American, 0.74% (1) Native American or Alaska Native, 0.0% (0) Asian, 0.0% (0) Pacific Islander or Native Hawaiian, 0.74% (1) from other races, and 0.74% (1) from two or more races. Hispanic or Latino of any race was 2.96% (4) of the population.

Of the 56 households, 23.2% had children under the age of 18; 76.8% were married couples living together; 5.4% had a female householder with no spouse or partner present. 7.1% of households consisted of individuals and 7.1% had someone living alone who was 65 years of age or older. The average household size was 1.3 and the average family size was 1.9. The percent of those with a bachelor's degree or higher was estimated to be 3.7% of the population.

20.7% of the population was under the age of 18, 8.1% from 18 to 24, 8.1% from 25 to 44, 44.4% from 45 to 64, and 18.5% who were 65 years of age or older. The median age was 48.8 years. For every 100 females, there were 101.5 males. For every 100 females ages 18 and older, there were 75.4 males.

== History ==
The Amana Colonies purchased the town from the Rock Island Railroad to use as a transportation hub. A meteorite struck the town in 1875.

In 1881, Homestead contained a train depot, hotel, post office, grain elevator, meeting house, schoolhouse, general store, lumber yard, and a large distributing warehouse.

The population was 285 in 1940.

== Popular culture ==
- Ashton Kutcher and his family lived four miles out of town. Ashton refers to Homestead as his hometown, as he lived there after his family relocated.
- Homestead serves at the setting for the Hallmark movie "Christmas in Homestead", but nothing was filmed in the town.
