= West Amana, Iowa =

- Census-designated place
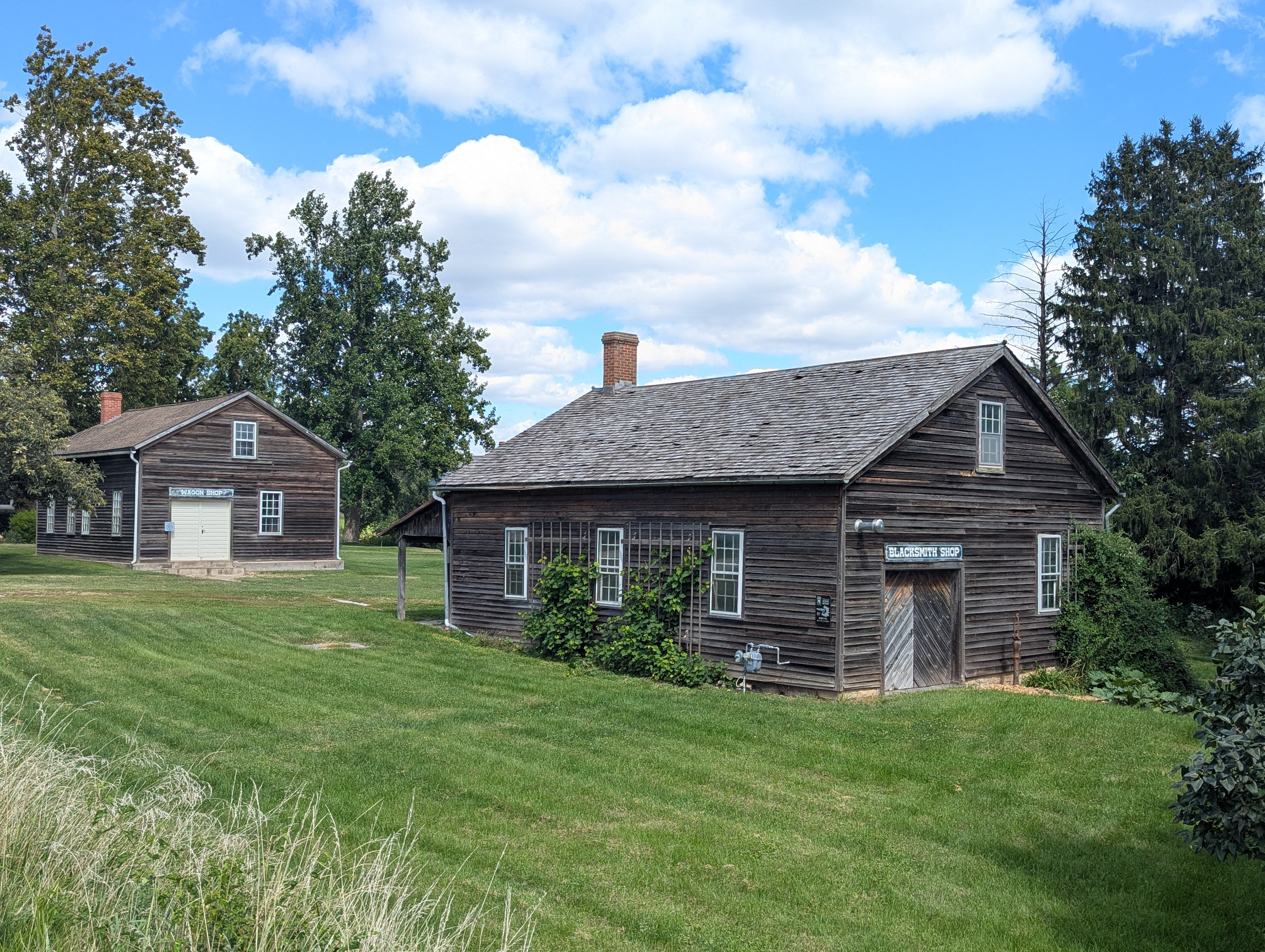
- Historic buildings in West Amana

- Location within Iowa Location within the United States
- Coordinates: 41°48′30″N 91°57′56″W
- Country: United States
- State: Iowa
- County: Iowa

Area
  - Total: 0.27 sq mi (0.71 km^{2})
  - Land: 0.27 sq mi (0.71 km^{2})
  - Water: 0 sq mi (0.00 km^{2})
- Elevation: 791 ft (241 m)

Population (2020)
  - Total: 140
  - Density: 514.3/sq mi (198.56/km^{2})
- Time zone: UTC-6 (Central (CST))
  - Summer (DST): UTC-5 (CDT)
- ZIP code: 52203
- FIPS code: 19-83505
- GNIS feature ID: 2629976

West Amana is an unincorporated community and census-designated place (CDP) in Iowa County, Iowa, United States, and is part of the "seven villages" of the Amana Colonies. As of the 2020 census, the population of West Amana was 140.

== History ==
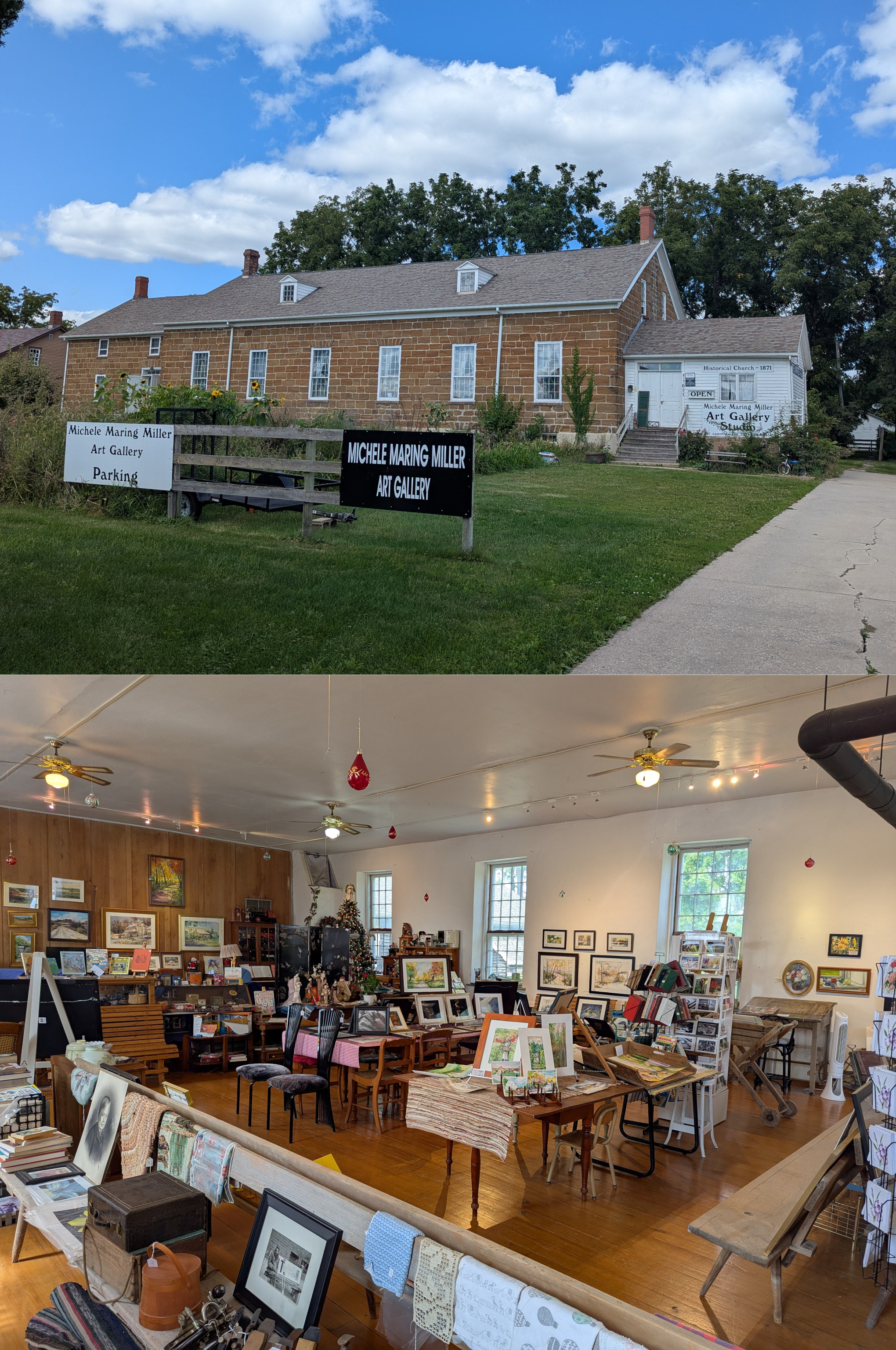
Michele Maring Miller Art Gallery in West Amana

In 1881, West Amana had a population of 170 and contained a store.

== Demographics ==
Historical population
Census	Pop.	Note	%±
2010	135		—
2020	140		3.7%
U.S. Decennial Census

=== 2020 census ===
As of the census of 2020, there were 140 people, 61 households, and 32 families residing in the community. The population density was 514.3 inhabitants per square mile (198.6/km^{2}). There were 69 housing units at an average density of 253.5 per square mile (97.9/km^{2}). The racial makeup of the community was 80.7% White, 1.4% Black or African American, 0.0% Native American, 0.0% Asian, 0.0% Pacific Islander, 8.6% from other races and 9.3% from two or more races. Hispanic or Latino persons of any race comprised 3.6% of the population.

Of the 61 households, 18.0% of which had children under the age of 18 living with them, 52.5% were married couples living together, 1.6% were cohabitating couples, 18.0% had a female householder with no spouse or partner present and 27.9% had a male householder with no spouse or partner present. 47.5% of all households were non-families. 45.9% of all households were made up of individuals, 29.5% had someone living alone who was 65 years old or older.

The median age in the community was 39.8 years. 17.9% of the residents were under the age of 20; 1.4% were between the ages of 20 and 24; 32.9% were from 25 and 44; 22.1% were from 45 and 64; and 25.7% were 65 years of age or older. The gender makeup of the community was 60.0% male and 40.0% female.
