= South Amana, Iowa =

- Census-designated place
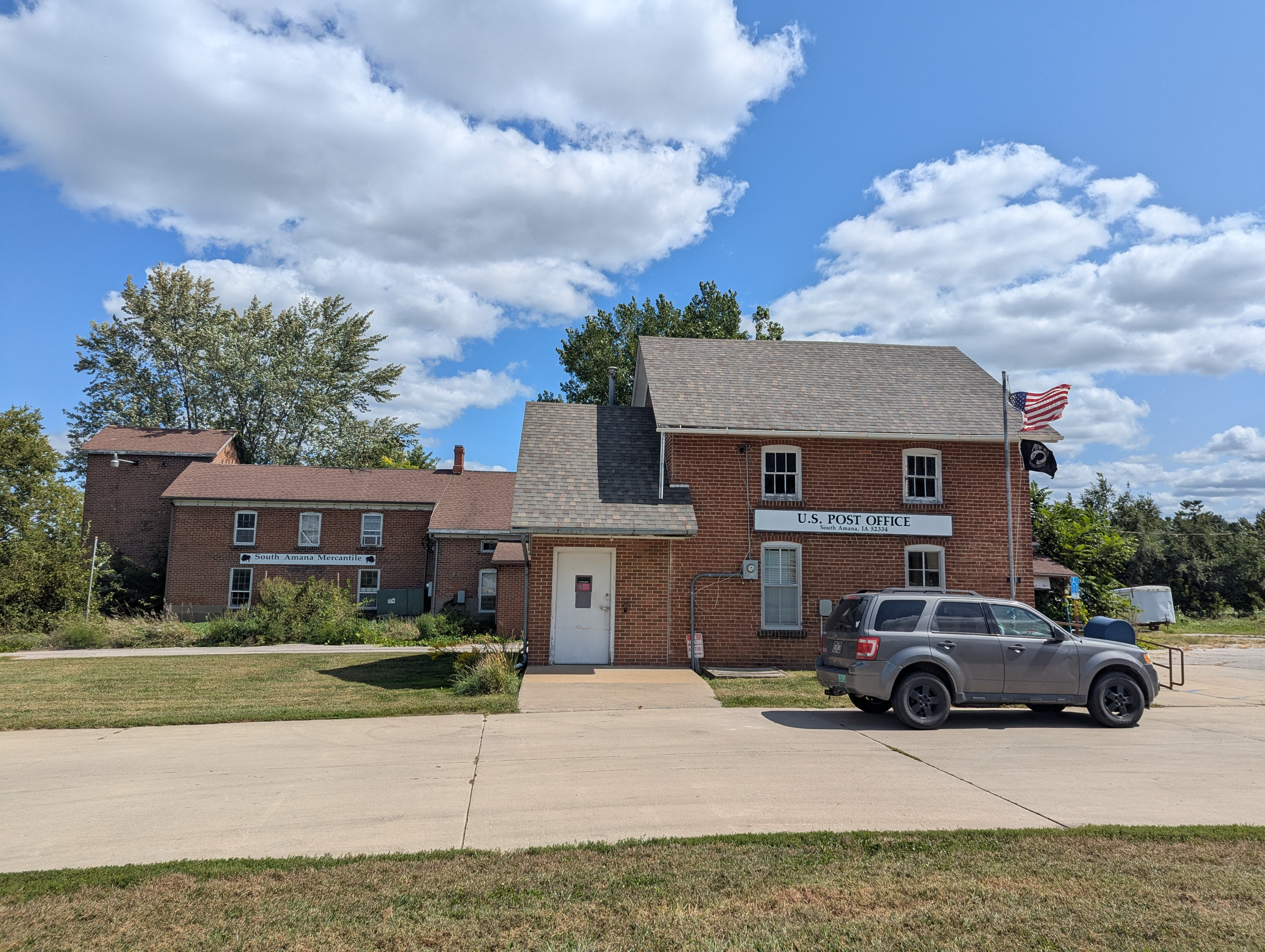
- South Amana post office

- Location within Iowa Location within the United States
- Coordinates: 41°46′13″N 91°57′36″W
- Country: United States
- State: Iowa
- County: Iowa

Area
  - Total: 1.39 sq mi (3.59 km^{2})
  - Land: 1.39 sq mi (3.59 km^{2})
  - Water: 0 sq mi (0.00 km^{2})
- Elevation: 791 ft (241 m)

Population (2020)
  - Total: 165
  - Density: 120/sq mi (46/km^{2})
- Time zone: UTC-6 (Central (CST))
  - Summer (DST): UTC-5 (CDT)
- ZIP code: 52334
- FIPS code: 19-73965
- GNIS feature ID: 2629972

South Amana is an unincorporated community and census-designated place (CDP) in northern Iowa County, Iowa, United States, and is part of the "seven villages" of the Amana Colonies. As of the 2020 census, it had a population of 165.

It lies along U.S. Route 6, east of the city of Marengo, the county seat of Iowa County. Its elevation is 778 feet (237 m). South Amana has a post office with the ZIP code of 52334, which opened on 19 June 1874.

== History ==
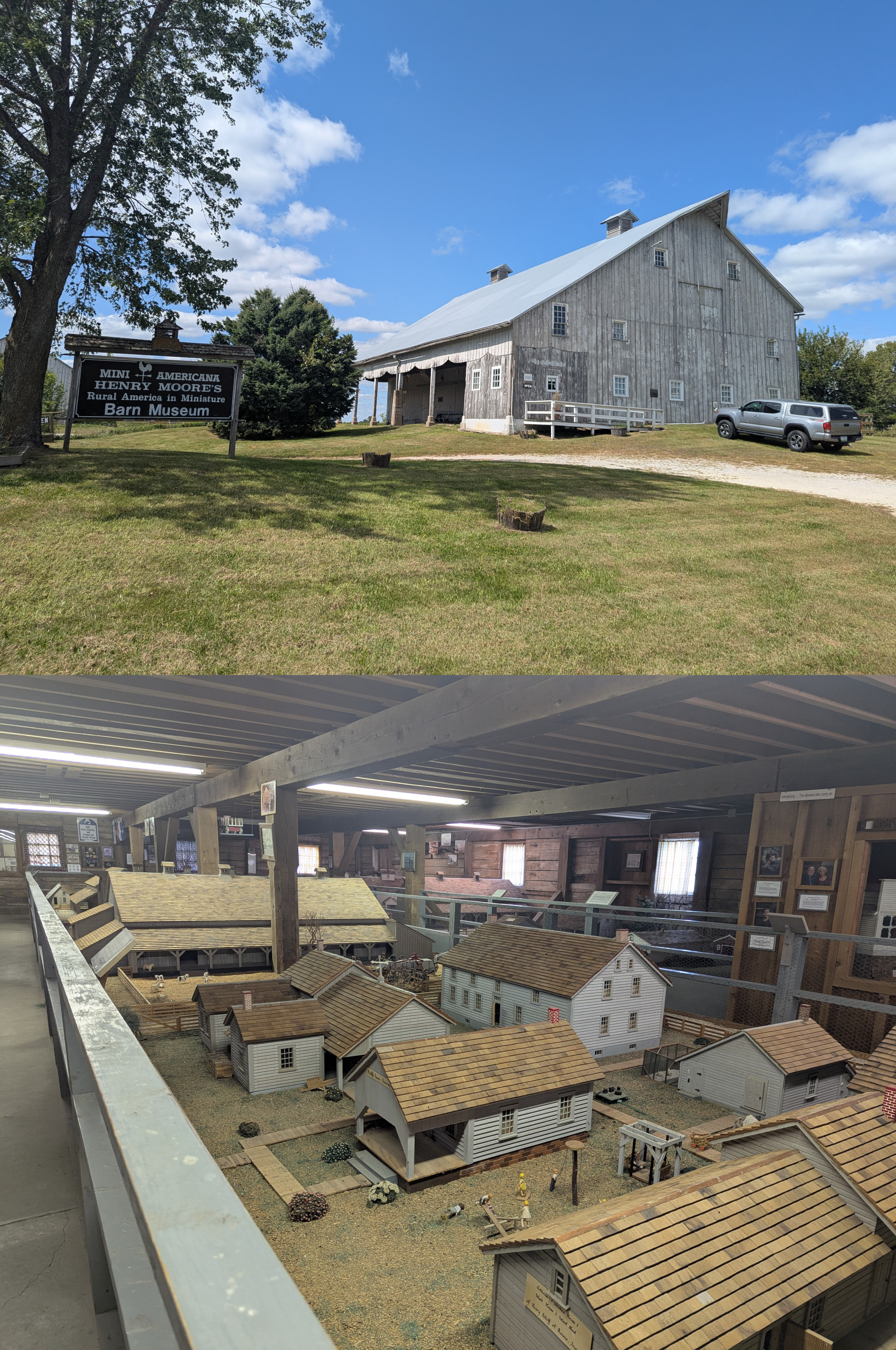
South Amana Barn Museum exterior (top) and interior (bottom)

South Amana was a shipping point on the Chicago, Rock Island and Pacific Railroad. The population was 180 in 1940.

== Demographics ==
Historical population
Census	Pop.	Note	%±
2010	159		—
2020	165		3.8%
U.S. Decennial Census

=== 2020 census ===
As of the census of 2020, there were 165 people, 68 households, and 34 families residing in the community. The population density was 119.1 inhabitants per square mile (46.0/km^{2}). There were 73 housing units at an average density of 52.7 per square mile (20.4/km^{2}). The racial makeup of the community was 92.1% White, 1.8% Black or African American, 0.0% Native American, 0.0% Asian, 0.0% Pacific Islander, 0.0% from other races and 6.1% from two or more races. Hispanic or Latino persons of any race comprised 1.8% of the population.

Of the 68 households, 19.1% of which had children under the age of 18 living with them, 39.7% were married couples living together, 7.4% were cohabitating couples, 10.3% had a female householder with no spouse or partner present and 42.6% had a male householder with no spouse or partner present. 50.0% of all households were non-families. 44.1% of all households were made up of individuals, 22.1% had someone living alone who was 65 years old or older.

The median age in the community was 46.3 years. 27.9% of the residents were under the age of 20; 4.2% were between the ages of 20 and 24; 17.0% were from 25 and 44; 32.7% were from 45 and 64; and 18.2% were 65 years of age or older. The gender makeup of the community was 53.3% male and 46.7% female.
