= Burnover =

Studio album by Greg Freeman
- Released: August 22, 2025
- Recorded: 2023–2024
- Studios: Little Jamaica (Burlington); Montrose (Los Angeles)
- Length: 45:03
- Labels: Canvasback; Transgressive
- Producer: Benny Yurco

Greg Freeman chronology
I Looked Out (2022)	Burnover (2025)	All Set the Bone (2026)

Singles from Burnover
- 1. "Point and Shoot" Released: April 23, 2025; 2. "Curtain" Released: May 30, 2025; 3. "Gallic Shrug" Released: June 25, 2025

Burnover is the second studio album by American alternative country musician Greg Freeman. It was released on August 22, 2025, via Canvasback and Transgressive in LP, CD and digital formats.

== Background ==
The album title was adapted from the burned-over district of New York. "Point and Shoot" was released as the album's first single on April 23, 2025. It was followed by the second and third singles, "Curtain" and "Gallic Shrug", on May 30 and June 25, 2025. "Curtain" was released with a music video directed by Carl Elsaesser.

== Reception ==
Professional ratings
Review scores
Source	Rating
The Line of Best Fit	8/10 stars
Paste	8.4/10

The Line of Best Fit gave the album a rating of eight out of ten, describing it as "a cauldron of ideas and attitudes, chronicling characters with hopes, fears, and traits of the American spirit."

It received a rating of 8.4 from Paste, whose reviewer Anna Pichler referred to it as "an ambitious and largely compelling (re)introduction to one of the most essential voices currently emerging from an ongoing country-rock boom."

== Track listing ==
All tracks are written by Greg Freeman.

Burnover track listing
No.	Title	Length
1.	"Point and Shoot"	3:05
2.	"Salesman"	3:42
3.	"Rome, New York"	3:17
4.	"Gallic Shrug"	4:50
5.	"Burnover"	6:04
6.	"Gulch"	2:32
7.	"Curtain"	6:39
8.	"Gone (Can Mean a Lot of Things)"	2:32
9.	"Sawmill"	3:26
10.	"Wolf Pine"	8:56
Total length:		45:03

== Personnel ==
Credits adapted from Bandcamp and Tidal.

- Greg Freeman – vocals, guitar, co-production (all tracks); violin (1, 3, 8), harmonica (1, 5); concertina, melodica (1); Mellotron (2), synthesizer (6); chimes, glockenspiel (10)
- Benny Yurco – production, engineering (all tracks); bass guitar (1, 3–8); choir vocals, Wurlitzer (3); slide guitar (5)
- Adrian Olsen – mixing, additional recording
- Josh Bonati – mastering
- Cam Gilmour – tenor saxophone (1, 2, 6, 8, 10), soprano saxophone (2, 6–8, 10), electric upright bass (10)
- Zack James – drums (1, 3–10), percussion (1), tambourine (3–9), shaker (7, 9), acoustic guitar (8)
- Sam Atallah – piano (1, 3–5, 7), organ (1, 6, 8), Wurlitzer (7), trumpet (8)
- Lily Seabird – background vocals, bass guitar (2, 10); choir vocals (3)
- Ben Rodgers – pedal steel guitar (2, 4, 6)
- Scott Maynard – drums (2)
- Francie Medosch – choir vocals (3)
- Jon Cox – choir vocals (3)
- Pat Coyle – background vocals (4)
- Seth Kauffman – strings (4)
- Merce Lemon – background vocals (6, 7)
- Patrick Sargent – saxophone (6)
- Scott Daniel – violin (9)
