= Ebenezer, New York =

Coordinates: 42°49′49″N 78°45′13″W

- Hamlet / Former village
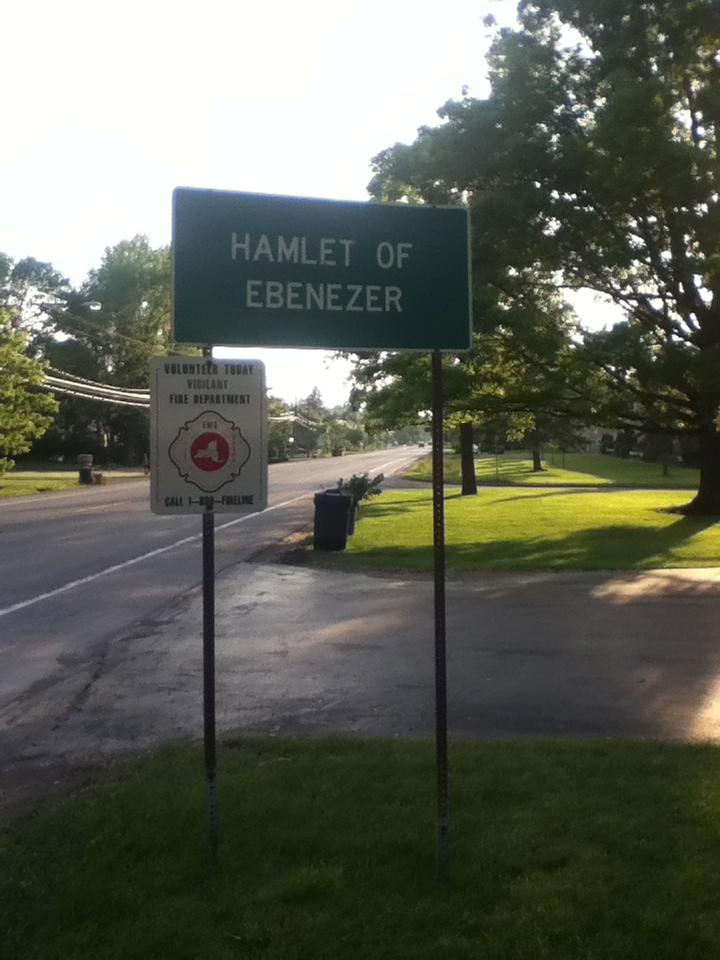
- Interactive map of Ebenezer, New York
- Country: United States
- State: New York
- County: Erie
- Town: West Seneca
- Village of Ebenezer: 1842
- Hamlet of Ebenezer: 1852

Ebenezer is a hamlet in the town of West Seneca in Erie County, New York, United States. It was established as part of the Ebenezer Colonies in 1842 by the Community of True Inspiration. After the community was annexed by the newly formed town of West Seneca in 1851, the Inspirationists moved on to the Amana Colonies in Iowa.

== See also ==
- Ebenezer Colonies
- New Ebenezer, New York
