= Amana German =

Language in Iowa based on West Central German

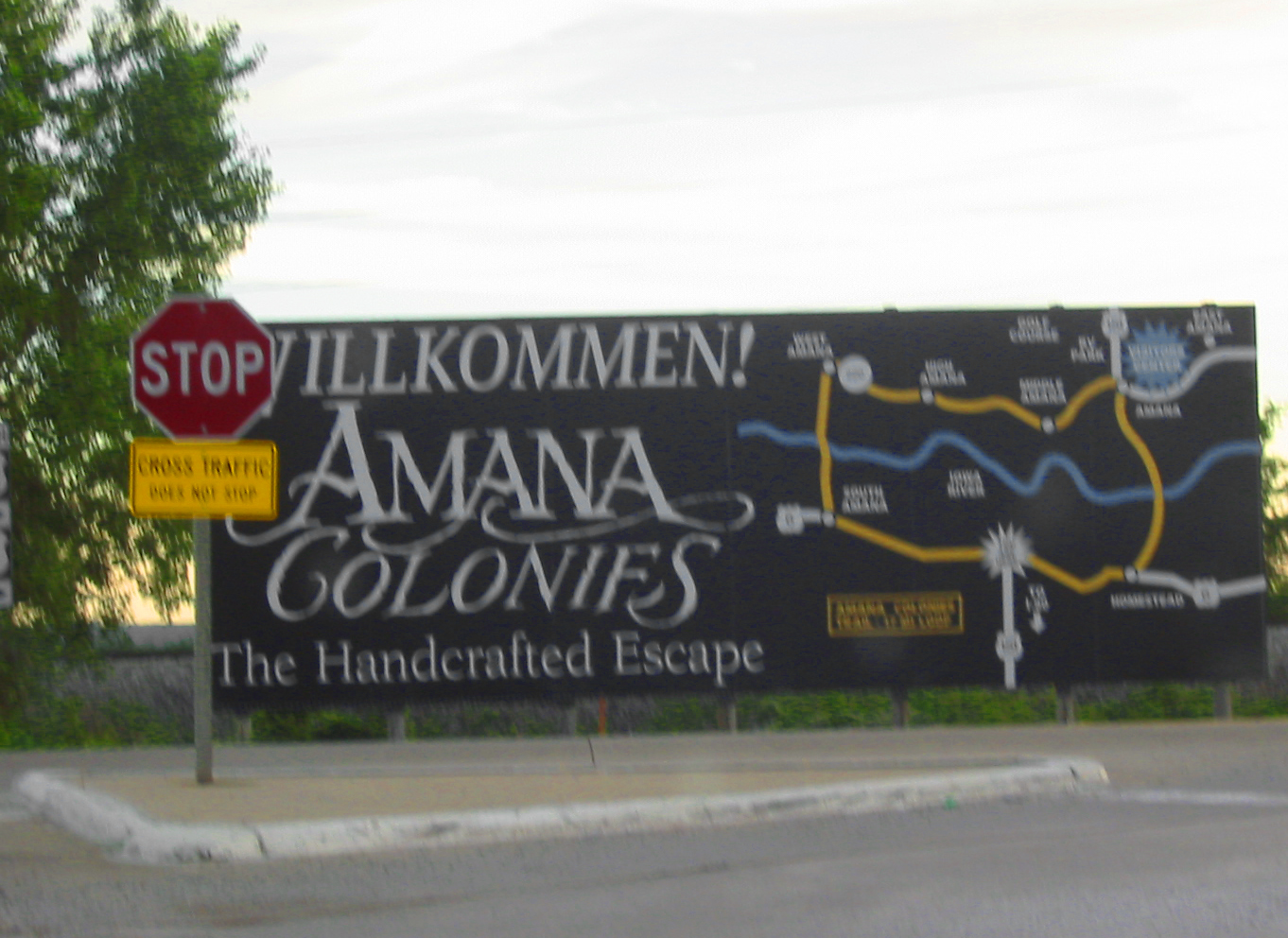
- Native to: United States
- Region: Amana Colonies in Iowa
- Language family: Indo-European: Germanic; West Germanic; Weser-Rhine Germanic; Central German; West Central German; Rhenish Franconian; Hessian; Amana German

Language codes
- ISO 639-3: –
- IETF: gmw-u-sd-usia

Amana German (German: Amana-Deutsch or Kolonie-Deutsch, lit. Colony German) is a regiolect based on West Central German that is still spoken by several hundred people in the Amana Colonies in Iowa.

The Amana Colonies were founded in 1856 by Inspirationalists of German origin who came from West Seneca near Buffalo in New York. Amana is derived from the Hessian dialect, which is a West Central German dialect. There are seven villages in Amana with slightly different dialect features.

Even though the use of the language is in decline, it is far from being moribund. There are several major studies about the language of Amana.

== Comparison to other dialects ==
J. William Frey compared in 1942 the dialect of Amana German with Pennsylvania German and noted:

- Amana German has the labial /bf/ corresponding to German /pf/, which is lacking in Pennsylvania German, being represented by /p/ or /b/.
- Pennsylvania German has the voiced velar spirant ǥ, which occurs only medially and often absent, which seems to be lacking in Amana German.
- The voiceless aspirated dental stop /t/ in Amana occurs only before vowels in initial position, the same is true in Pennsylvania German.
  - For example: Amana-PaG: Tee 'tea', Tietscher 'teacher', etc.
- In all other cases unaspirated /d/ is found initially and medially.
  - For example: Both: doot 'dead' (German tot), Deller 'plate' (German teller), drinke 'to drink' (German trinken), as well as Bruuder 'brother' (German Bruder), Mudder 'mother' (German Mutter).
- Both /t/ and /d/ occur finally in both dialects.

== Literature ==
- Philip E. Webber: Kolonie-Deutsch: Life and Language in Amana. Ames, 2006. (Originally 1993; expended ed., University of Iowa Press, Iowa City, 2009) ISBN 9781587298882
- Michael T. Putnam: Anaphors in contact: The distribution of intensifiers and reflexives in Amana German in "Studies on German-language islands". Amsterdam et al., 2011.
- Lawrence L. Rettig: Grammatical structures in Amana German. Dissertation at the University of Iowa, 1970. preview
- Joan Liffring-Zug: Life in Amana: reporters' views of the communal way, 1867 - 1935. Iowa City: Penfield Books, 1998 ISBN 9781572160507

== See also ==
- German language in the United States
  - Pennsylvania German
  - Texas German
  - Wisconsin German
- Languages of Iowa
- Amana Colonies
- Community of True Inspiration
