= Christian Metz =

Christian Metz may refer to:

- Christian Metz (theorist) (1931–1993), French film theorist, known for pioneering film semiotics
- Christian Metz (Inspirationalist) (1794–1867), German-born migrant to the U.S. who set up a religious sect
