= Burned-over district =

Historic region in Upstate New York

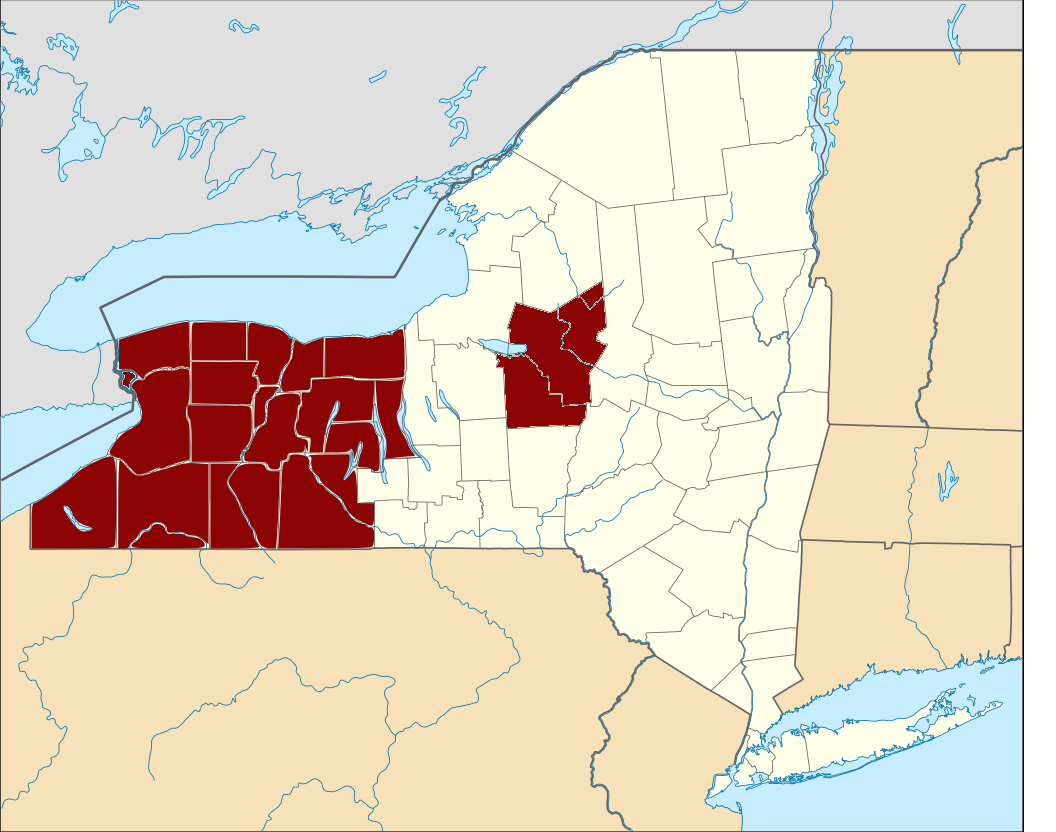
Map showing the counties of New York considered part of the "Burned-over District"

The "burned-over district" comprises Western and parts of Central New York State. In the early 19th century, religious revivals and the formation of new religious movements of the Second Great Awakening took place to such a great extent that spiritual fervor expanded like a forest fire.

Charles Grandison Finney (1792–1875) popularized the term: his posthumous 1876 book Autobiography of Charles G. Finney referred to a "burnt district" to denote an area in central and western New York State during the Second Awakening:

I found that region of country what, in the western phrase, would be called, a "burnt district." There had been, a few years previously, a wild excitement passing through that region, which they called a revival of religion, but which turned out to be spurious. ... It was reported as having been a very extravagant excitement; and resulted in a reaction so extensive and profound, as to leave the impression on many minds that religion was a mere delusion. A great many men seemed to be settled in that conviction. Taking what they had seen as a specimen of a revival of religion, they felt justified in opposing anything looking toward the promoting of a revival.

These spurious movements created feelings of apprehension towards the revivals in which Finney was influential as a preacher.

In references where the religious revival is related to reform movements of the period, such as abolition, women's rights, utopian social experiments, anti-Masonry, Mormonism, prohibition, vegetarianism, and Seventh-Day Adventism, the "burned-over" region expands to include other areas of Upstate New York that were important to these movements.

Historical study of the phenomenon began with Whitney R. Cross, in 1951. Subsequent study in the last quarter of the twentieth century re-assessed the extent to which religious fervor actually affected the region. Linda K. Pritchard uses statistical data to show that, compared to the rest of New York State, to the Ohio River Valley in the lower Midwest, and to the United States as a whole, the religiosity of the burned-over district was typical rather than exceptional. More recent works have argued that these revivals in Western New York had a unique and lasting impact upon the religious and social life of the entire nation.

== Religion ==
Western New York was still an American frontier during the early Erie Canal boom, and professional and established clergy were scarce. Many of the self-taught people were susceptible to enthusiasms of folk religion. Evangelists won many converts to Protestant sects, such as Congregationalists, Baptists, and Methodists. Converts in nonconformist sects became part of numerous new religious movements, all of which were founded by laypeople during the early 19th century, including:

- The Latter Day Saint movement (whose largest branch is the Church of Jesus Christ of Latter-day Saints), originating circa 1828. Joseph Smith, Jr., lived in the area and said he was led by the angel Moroni to his source for the Book of Mormon, the Golden Plates, near Palmyra, New York.
- The Millerites, originating circa 1834. William Miller was a farmer who lived in Low Hampton, New York. He preached that the literal Second Coming would occur on October 22, 1844. Millerism became extremely popular in western New York state. Some of its concepts are still held by church organizations affiliated with Adventism, such as Seventh-day Adventists.
- The Fox sisters of Hydesville, New York, conducted the first table-rapping séances in the area around 1848, leading to the American movement of Spiritualism – centered in the retreat at Lily Dale and in the Plymouth Spiritualist Church in Rochester, New York – which taught communion with the dead.
- The Shakers were very active in the area, establishing their communal farm in central New York in 1826, and a major revival in 1837. The first Shaker settlement in America, also a communal farm, was established in 1776 just north of Albany in an area first known as Niskayuna, then Watervliet, now the town of Colonie. Shaker leader Mother Ann Lee is buried in the Shaker cemetery located in the Watervliet Shaker Historic District.
- The Oneida Society was a large utopian group that established a successful community in central New York, founded in 1848; it disbanded in 1881. It was known for its unique interpretation of group marriage under which mates were paired by committee; the children of the community were raised in common.
- The Social Gospel, founded by Washington Gladden while he was living in nearby Owego, New York, during his childhood and teens, circa 1832 to 1858. Gladden was succeeded by Walter Rauschenbusch of Rochester, New York.
- The Ebenezer Colonies, calling themselves the True Inspiration Congregations (German: Wahre Inspirations-Gemeinden), first settled in New York near Buffalo in what is now the town of West Seneca. However, seeking more isolated surroundings, they moved to Iowa (near present-day Iowa City) in 1856, becoming the Amana Colony.

== Social and political reform ==
In addition to religious activity, the region known as the burned-over district was noted for social radicalism. The Oneida Institute (1827–1843) was a center of abolitionism and the first college in the country to admit black students on the same terms as white students. The short-lived New-York Central College was the first college to accept both black students and women from its beginning and was also the first college in the country to employ African-American professors. Alfred University is the oldest surviving college in the United States to admit women to all its programs of study, rather than having female-specific programs.

Elizabeth Cady Stanton, the early American feminist, was a resident of Seneca Falls in central New York in the mid-1800s. She and others in the community organized the Seneca Falls Convention devoted to women's suffrage and rights in 1848.

The larger region was the main source of converts to the Fourierist utopian socialist movement, starting around 1816. The Skaneateles Community in central New York, founded in 1843, was such an experiment. The Oneida Society was also considered a utopian group.

Related to radical reform, Upstate New York provided many Hunter Patriots, some of whom volunteered to invade Canada during the Patriot War from December 1837 to December 1838.

== Location ==
The District can be broadly described as the area in New York State between the Finger Lakes and Lake Erie, and contains the following counties:

- Allegany
- Cattaraugus
- Chautauqua
- Erie
- Genesee
- Livingston
- Madison
- Monroe
- Niagara
- Oneida
- Ontario
- Orleans
- Seneca
- Steuben
- Wayne
- Wyoming
- Yates

Onondaga County, New York including the city of Syracuse

== See also ==
- John Humphrey Noyes
- Seventh-day Adventists
- Ellen G. White
- Bible Belt
- Religious ecstasy
- Rust Belt
