= Community of True Inspiration Residence =

- U.S. National Register of Historic Places
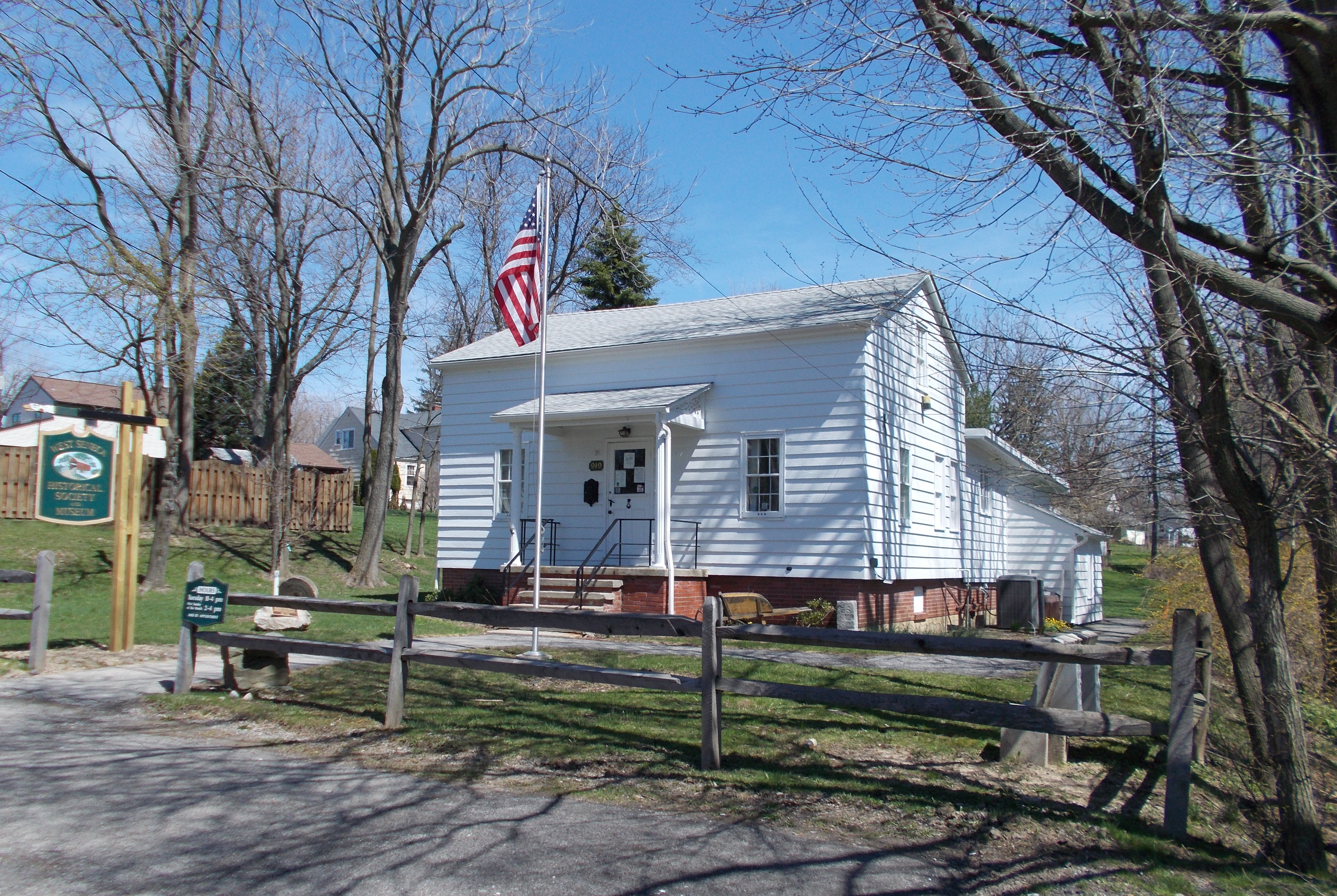
- Community of True Inspiration Residence, April 2013

- Location within New York Location within the United States
- Location: 919 Mill Rd., West Seneca, New York
- Coordinates: 42°50′00″N 78°45′01″W
- Area: Less than one acre
- Built: c. 1850
- NRHP reference No.: 13000370
- Added to NRHP: June 25, 2013

Community of True Inspiration Residence, also known as the Lower Ebenezer Society house and West Seneca Historical Society, is a historic home located at West Seneca in Erie County, New York. It was built about 1850, and is a 1 1/2-story, vernacular wood-frame building with a gable roof. A rear wing was added in the 1870s, with additions made in 1956. It was moved to its present site in 1956, when donated to the West Seneca Historical Society. It is one of the few remaining buildings in the Ebenezer section of West Seneca built by the Community of True Inspiration who settled in the area in the 1840s.

It was listed on the National Register of Historic Places in 2013.
