= Bertha Maude Horack Shambaugh =

American photographer and writer

- Born: February 12, 1871
- Died: August 30, 1953 (aged 82)
- Occupations: Photographer, writer
- Known for: Her work on the history of Amana Colonies

Bertha Maude Horack Shambaugh (February 12, 1871 – August 30, 1953) was an American photographer and writer.

== Early life ==
Shambaugh was born in Belle Plaine, Iowa on February 12, 1871, later moving in 1880 to Iowa City with her parents and two younger brothers. She became interested in art and music because of her father while she learned of classic literature from her mother. From 1890 to 1891, she took more than 100 pictures of the Amana Colonies. From 1889 to 1895, Shambaugh was taught by Thomas Macbride at the State University of Iowa. She married Benjamin Shambaugh on August 11, 1897, after first meeting him at one of his lectures about the history of Iowa City.

== Career ==
As part of the 1901 Ninth Biennial Report of the Bureau of Labor Statistics for the State of Iowa, she completed a study about the industrial phases of the Amana society. In 1896, her essay about the Amanas appeared in the Midland Monthly. She published an article about the same subject in October 1902 for World Today, featuring her photographs. In 1908, her book Amana: Community of True Inspiration was published by the State Historical Society of Iowa. Shambaugh has been named "the chief historian of Amana".
