= The Holey Bible =

Studio album by Florry
- Released: August 4, 2023
- Studio: Philadelphia, Pennsylvania, United States; Studio 4 in Conshocken, Pennsylvania, United States
- Genre: Country rock
- Length: 45:33
- Language: English
- Label: Dear Life Records
- Producer: Florry; Lucas Knapp

Florry chronology
Sweet Guitar Solos (2023)	The Holey Bible (2023)

Singles from The Holey Bible
- 1. "Drunk and High" Released: June 21, 2023; 2. "Take My Heart" Released: July 6, 2023; 3. "Cowgirl Giving" Released: July 19, 2023

The Holey Bible is a 2023 studio album by American alternative country band Florry.

== Reception ==
Ben Salmon of online retailer Bandcamp chose this release as one of the best country music albums of August 2023, comparing the music to Neil Young and stating that it is full of "ragged roots rock, charming imperfections, and positive vibes". At BrooklynVegan, Andrew Sacher included this among a list of notable releases, writing that the music is like "listening to a band play in the middle of the woods, away from civilization and electricity" and comparing it to indie music artists Big Thief and Wednesday. Pitchfork editors included this album as one of the best releases of the week, calling it an album "filled with optimism" and a review by critic Abby Jones scored it a 7.6 out of 10, writing that it is "an alternative to nihilistic indifference: What if instead of dispassionately accepting disaster as inevitable, we use the bitter end as a motivator to make the best of what time is left?". Editors at Stereogum chose this for Album of the Week, with critic Chris DeVille writing that it is "the best Florry album by a wide margin" and that the album "saunters with a chemistry and charisma previously unheard on Florry records, shifting the project's vibe from confessional to communal".

Andrew Sacher of BrooklynVegan included this among a list of 13 great country albums of 2023. Matt Mitchell of Paste included this among the 30 best country, folk, and Americana albums of 2023.

== Track listing ==
All songs written by Sheridan Frances Arthur Medosch

1. "Drunk and High" – 2:19
2. "Take My Heart" – 2:54
3. "Hot Weather" – 3:12
4. "Cowgirl Giving" – 5:05
5. "Big Fall" – 2:58
6. "Big Winter" – 6:22
7. "Ily Ily" – 3:26
8. "Say It Again" – 3:02
9. "Cowgirl in a Ditch" – 4:37
10. "Song for My Art" – 6:29
11. "From Where You Are" – 5:09

== Personnel ==
Florry

- Will Henriksen – fiddle, mandolin, vocals, production
- Sheridan Frances Arthur "Francie" Medosch – guitar, vocals, production
- John Murray – guitar, lap steel, vocals, bass guitar on "Song for My Art", production
- Jared Radichel – bass guitar, vocals, production
- Victoria Rose – 12-string guitar, vocals, production
- Sam Silbert – pedal steel, production
- Joey Sullivan – drums, percussion, production

Additional personnel

- Justin Bartlett – recording at Studio 4 in Conshocken, Pennsylvania on "Hot Weather", "Big Fall", and "From Where You Are"
- Allison Halter – painting on photo stand in
- Chloe Howard – design
- Heather Jones – mastering
- Zena Kay – pedal steel on "Hot Weather"
- Lucas Knapp – recording in Philadelphia, Pennsylvania on "Drunk and High", "Take My Heart", "Cowgirl Giving", "Big Winter", "Ily Ily", "Say It Again", "Cowgirl in a Ditch", and "Song for My Art"; mixing; production
- Joe Pietropaolo – photo stand in, front cover photography
- Justus Proffit – design

== See also ==
- List of 2023 albums
