= Joanna E. Schanz =

American basket weaver

- Born: 1942 (age 82–83); Cedar Rapids, Iowa, U.S.
- Occupation: Basket maker
- Years active: 1977–present

Joanna E. Schanz (born 1942) is an American basket weaver. She is credited with reviving the Amana arts of broom making and basket weaving. She wrote Willow Basketry of the Amana Colonies in 1986, in honor of Philip Dickel, who taught her how to make baskets. She won the Lifetime Achievement Award from the National Basketry Organization and one of her willow baskets is held at the Smithsonian American Art Museum.

== Personal life ==
Schanz was born in Cedar Rapids, Iowa, in 1942. She married her husband Norman when she was 18 years old, and in 1961 they moved to West Amana, Iowa, a village of the Amana Colonies. They later had four children. At the time, the older generation were wary of outsiders, so Schanz made an effort to involve herself in the local community, taking a job at a restaurant and participating in school activities.

== Career ==
Schanz became interested in Amana folk art after being gifted a broom that was meant to be long-lasting. The broom was made by a blind man named Phillip Graesser, who was one of the few remaining Amana broom makers. After Graesser retired, Schanz and her husband received his broom making machine and they started a shop named Broom and Basket in West Amana. They hired retired workers to create brooms using the machine, resulting in the Amana craft of broom making being revived. In the 1970s, Schanz asked the last Amana basket weaver Philip Dickel how to weave willow baskets. Dickel showed Schanz how to make baskets in 1977. Dickel later began working at Amana Woolen Mill in its carding department and at Amana Corporation as a night watchman. He died in 1981, and Schanz always mentions Dickel's help with her reviving Amana basket making. Schanz taught others how to weave baskets at her store and at national conventions. She weaves baskets with willow that she grew herself or had imported from England and Belgium. She has also woven baskets with dogwood, lilac, honeysuckle, mock orange, and mulberry. Her baskets last a long time due to the bottom rims that can be removed for replacements. Her store closed in 2020.

Schanz has taught others how to weave baskets as part of the Amana Arts Guild. She wrote Willow Basketry of the Amana Colonies in 1986, in honor of Dickel. In 2019, Schanz won the Lifetime Achievement Award from the National Basketry Organization for her basket weaving and working with the Philip Dickel Basket Museum. One of her willow baskets is held at the Smithsonian American Art Museum, but it is not on public display.
