= Barbara Heinemann Landmann =

- Born: January 11, 1795; Alsace, France
- Died: May 21, 1883 (aged 88)
- Occupation: spiritual leader
- Spouse: George Landmann (m. 1823)

Barbara Heinemann Landmann (January 11, 1795 – May 21, 1883) was a spiritual leader with the Community of True Inspiration, for which she served as Werkzeug, or Instrument, in both Europe and the United States. Her sermons and writings are still used during the Community's religious services.

== Biography ==
Landmann was born as Barbara Heinemann to a German family in the territory of Alsace, France in 1795. During her childhood she worked as a wool spinner and later in a restaurant. In 1817, at age 22, she experienced a religious vision and joined the Community of True Inspiration (Scheuner, 1873). She became a Werkzeug with the German congregation of the Community in 1818. Landmann was arrested in 1819 when the village of Bergzabern decided to persecute the Inspirationists. Later that year she was banished from the congregation due to a pregnancy out of wedlock, though she was able to retain many of her own followers.

She married George Landmann in 1823, but the husband and wife were again banished from their congregation. They emigrated to the United States with several followers. After settling in the present-day West Seneca, New York, Landmann again became a Werkzeug with the Ebenezer Colonies in the area. Between ages 28 and 54 she retired from the role due to a loss of faith, but she returned to the role in 1849 after experiencing another religious vision. In that year she moved with some followers to Homestead, Iowa and started another congregation of Inspirationists known as the Amana Colonies. She served as Werkzeug for this congregation until her death at age 88 in 1883.

Landmann's work with the Amana Colonies in Iowa was noted by author Charles Nordhoff in the book The Communistic Societies of the United States (1875). After her death, Landmann was buried in a modest grave at the Amana Colonies (Shambaugh, 1908).
