= Ebenezer Colonies =

Settlement founded by the Community of True Inspiration

The Ebenezer Colonies was a settlement founded by the Community of True Inspiration in what is now the town of West Seneca, New York. A congregation of Inspirationists emigrated to the site from Germany in 1843. The congregation began to relocate to Iowa in 1855 and the settlement's land was eventually abandoned and sold.

== History ==
The Community of True Inspiration congregation in Alsace, France was led by Michael Krausert, Barbara Heinemann Landmann, and Christian Metz in the early 1800s. Due to internecine disputes, prosecution by local authorities, and agricultural difficulties, the congregation decided to emigrate to the United States. Metz and a committee of elders traveled to New York State and selected a site near the present West Seneca that had formerly been occupied by Seneca. The tract was purchased from a local company in what may have been a fraudulent transaction.

Metz named the tract Ebenezer after a passage in the Books of Samuel. The congregation started building a self-sufficient community with schools and milling facilities in 1843. About 800 Inspirationists migrated from Alsace to inhabit the settlement and communications with members still in Europe degraded. After conflicts with some Seneca still living in the area, the congregation paid the tribe an annual fee. The American government ordered the Seneca to vacate the land but the tribe claimed in court that they were still the owners. The dispute ended in favor of the Inspirationists and the Seneca moved to the Cattaraugus Reservation to the south.

By 1854, the Ebenezer Colonies were unable to grow any further due to expansion of the nearby city of Buffalo, while some of their practices were curtailed upon being incorporated into the new town of West Seneca. Metz testified that he had experienced a religious vision in which the Inspirationists would move to the American Midwest. A committee traveled to Iowa and selected a new site at Homestead for the congregation. The Inspirationists sold the land in West Seneca and migrated to the Iowa site. That settlement became known as the Amana Colonies and the move was completed by 1865.

== Legacy ==
The Ebenezer Colonies' cemeteries were incorporated into facilities that are still maintained by West Seneca today. An Inspirationist meeting house was moved and currently serves as the West Seneca Historical Society and Museum. The West Seneca town seal includes images of Metz's house and an Ebenezer Colonies boundary marker.

== Sources ==
- Manley, J. E. (n. d.). Lot 94/95 History of Burchfield Property. Retrieved June 6, 2010, from https://web.archive.org/web/20101013221403/http://www.westseneca.net/history.html
- Perkins, W. R. and Wick, B.L. (1891). History of the Amana Society or Community of True Inspiration. Iowa City: State University of Iowa. ISBN 978-1-151-85448-3
- Shambaugh, B. M. H. (1908). Amana: the Community of True Inspiration. 1988 facsimile, Museum of Amana History and the State Historical Society of Iowa. Iowa: Penfield Press. ISBN 0-941016-47-1
