= New Ebenezer, New York =

Hamlet in New York, United States

Coordinates: 42°51′24″N 78°44′29″W

New Ebenezer is a hamlet in the town of West Seneca in Erie County, New York, United States.

== See also ==
- Ebenezer, New York
