= Lily Seabird =

American indie rock musician

Lily Seabird is an American indie rock musician based in Burlington, Vermont. Seabird is currently signed to Lame-O Records.

== Biography ==
Seabird grew up in Bucks County, Pennsylvania. After two years at the New School, she transferred to the University of Vermont and graduated in 2019 with degrees in political science and English. While working as a Climate and Energy Fellow at the Vermont Public Interest Research Group, she released her first EP in 2021 titled Beside Myself. Seabird the 2022 BirdSong festival on a bill with artists like her collaborator Greg Freeman, Tiberius, and Trophy Wife. In 2024, Seabird released her debut album titled Alas. In 2025, Seabird released her second full-length album titled Trash Mountain. The title of the album comes from an area of Burlington, Vermont Seabird lives in with a group of other musicians. In June 2026, Seabird released "Election Day" as the lead single to her album Lightspheres On Their Way. The album is scheduled to release on September 4, 2026.

== Discography ==
Studio albums

- Alas (2024)
- Trash Mountain (2025, Lame-O Records)
- Lightspheres on the Way (2026)

EPs

- Beside Myself (2021)
