= Greg Freeman (musician) =

American country musician

- Genre: Alternative country
- Label: Canvasback Music
- Website: greg-freeman.net

Greg Freeman is an American alternative country musician based in Burlington, Vermont. Freeman was raised in Bethesda, Maryland. Freeman released his debut studio album in 2022 titled I Looked Out, through the record label Bud Tapes. After the album slowly gained attention, it was reissued in 2024 through Transgressive Records imprint Canvasback Music. Freeman announced his second full-length album in April 2025 titled Burnover. The album was released on August 22, 2025. Freeman's third full length album, All Set The Bone, was released on October 2, 2026

== Discography ==
Studio albums

- I Looked Out (2022)
- Burnover (2025)
- All Set the Bone (2026)
