= Christian Metz (Inspirationalist) =

Christian Metz (1794–1867) was born in Germany and immigrated to the United States on October 26, 1842. Once in the U.S., he helped to create a colony for the Community of True Inspiration, a pietist sect. The first was named Ebenezer near what is now Buffalo, New York. In 1855, he relocated to Iowa along with the 1,200-strong congregation and assisted in the founding of the Amana Colonies.

== See also ==
- Amana Colonies
- Inspirationalists
