= Florry =

American alternative country band led by Francie Medosch

- Origin: Philadelphia, Pennsylvania
- Genre: Alternative country
- Years active: 2018-present
- Label: Dear Life Records
- Members: Francie Medosch; Jon Cox; Collin Dennen; Will Henriksen; Katya Malison; John Murray; Joey Sullivan

Florry is an American alternative country band from Philadelphia, Pennsylvania.

== History ==
The group began when lead singer Francie Medosch was a teenager. The band name comes from the name of a character in Betty Smith's novel A Tree Grows in Brooklyn. The group released their first album, Brown Bunny, in 2018. The album title is a reference to Chloë Sevigny’s titular character of the movie The Brown Bunny. The group released an EP in 2021 titled Big Fall. In 2023, the group released their second full-length album titled The Holey Bible. The album received positive reviews, including "Album of the Week" at Stereogum. In 2025, the group released their latest full-length album titled Sounds Like..., to positive reviews.

== Band members ==
- Francie Medosch – lead vocals, guitars, percussion
- Jon Cox – pedal steel, banjo
- Collin Dennen – bass guitar
- Will Henriksen – fiddle, mandolin, piano, keyboards, backing vocals
- Katya Malison – backing vocals
- John Murray – guitars, vocals
- Joey Sullivan – drums, percussion

== Discography ==
Studio albums

- Brown Bunny (2018)
- The Holey Bible (2023, Dear Life Records)
- Sounds Like... (2025, Dear Life Records)
