= Wisconsin German =

German spoken in Wisconsin, USA

- The flag of Wisconsin.
- Native speakers: 36,443 (2013)
- Language family: Indo-European: Germanic; West Germanic; Elbe Germanic; German; American German; Wisconsin German

Language codes
- ISO 639-3: –
- IETF: de-u-sd-uswi

Wisconsin German
Languages
- English, Wisconsin High German, Low German, Kölsch, Swiss German, Luxembourgish/Yiddish

The term Wisconsin German refers to both Wisconsin High German and to heritage dialects of German spoken in Wisconsin. By 1853, a third of Wisconsin's population was coming from German-speaking lands; by the end of the 19th century, Wisconsin's largest minority of non-English speakers were German speakers. Unlike other heritage languages, which tend to become moribund by the third generation, Wisconsin German speakers have maintained their heritage language(s) alongside English for multiple generations, from the 1840s to well until the mid-20th century. This is due in part to their immigration patterns: the German immigrants tended to settle within ethnically homogeneous (or similar) communities, with similar linguistic, cultural, and geographic backgrounds. Additionally, the maintenance of the language was supported by German being taught and used in many local churches, schools, and the press. While Wisconsin German retains many standard and/or dialectal features of German, it has not only incorporated some linguistic elements of English, but also developed unique and innovative (morphosyntactic, syntactic, lexical) characteristics of its own. By the early mid-20th century, social, political and economic factors such as urbanization and severe persecution during World War I, contributed to a general shift from German to English.

== History ==
By the mid-19th century, many German immigrants had settled in Wisconsin; by the latter half of the 1800s, Germans had chosen Wisconsin over other American states as their destination. This was partly because of the state's resources, available land, and the entrepreneurship of land agents, but also because these immigrants were seeking new economic opportunities, and religious or political freedom.

Freistadt, for example, was founded in 1839 by German Lutherans from Pomerania who were escaping Prussian religious reform and persecution. The settlement formed part of the Old Lutheran emigration led by Pastor J. A. A. Grabau, who recruited approximately 600 Pomeranians; the emigrants divided at Buffalo, New York, and the Wisconsin-bound party founded Freistadt, or "free city," most likely to commemorate their newfound religious freedom in the Americas. Levi gives the Freistadt founders as 300 Lutherans; the Trinity Freistadt Historical Society describes them as about forty families. Both their faith and maintenance of their East Pomeranian dialect were important to the Freistadters: although the settlement was founded in 1839, there were still East Pomeranian speakers in Freistadt well into the end of the 20th century.

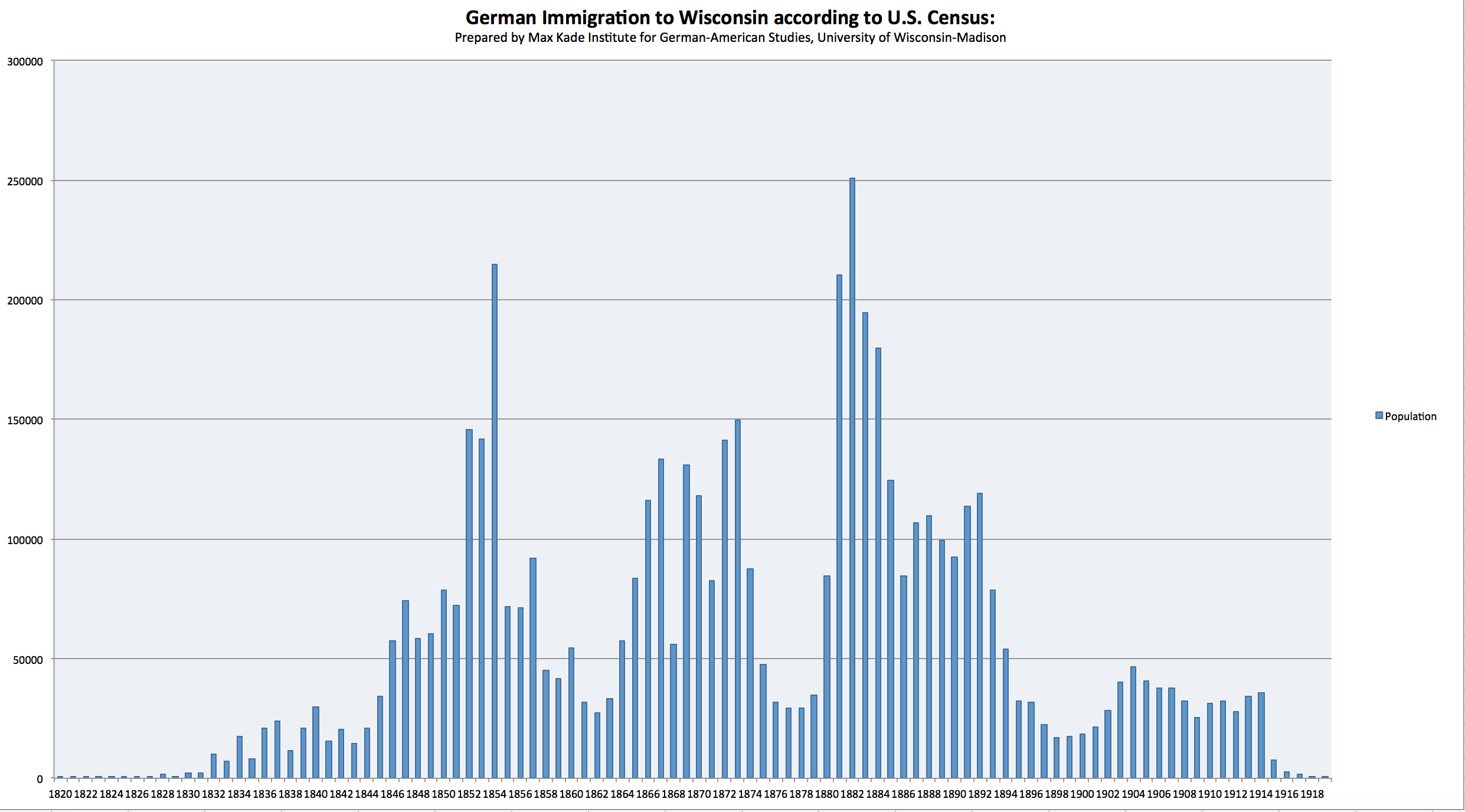
Graph charting the Immigration of Germans to the U.S. 1820-1918. Image Courtesy of Max Kade Institute for German-American Studies, University of Wisconsin-Madison

== Wisconsin High German and dialects ==
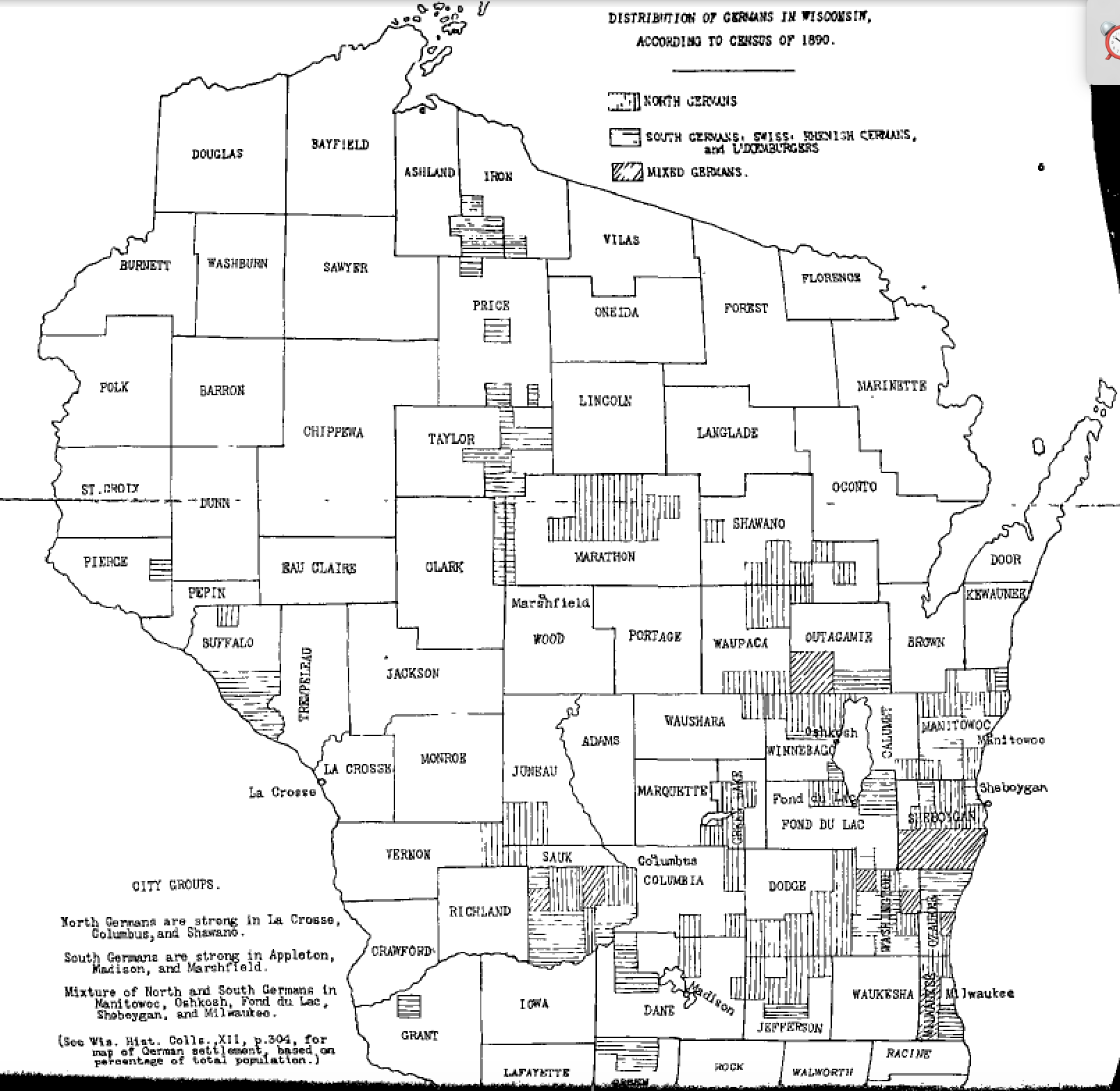
Distribution of Germans in Wisconsin according to US Census 1890.

These German speakers were from many different regions and states, such as Mecklenburg-Schwerin, Pomerania, Posen, Rhineland, Westphalia, Switzerland, Bavaria, Luxembourg, Baden, Saxony, Hesse, Württemberg, and Austria. Each group brought its own dialect, which it continued to use in the home, community and even in local Wisconsin businesses.

In addition, a form of Wisconsin High German, a koiné of Standard German with dialectal features, was used parallel to the community's dialect, such as in churches, and elementary and secondary schools; this meant that many Wisconsinites were trilingual, speaking their heritage dialect, Wisconsin High German and English. The extended multilingual contact over multiple generations of Wisconsin German heritage speakers, has resulted in the development of a language that not only contains features of their ancestral dialect, standard German and English, but also developed new linguistic features of its own.

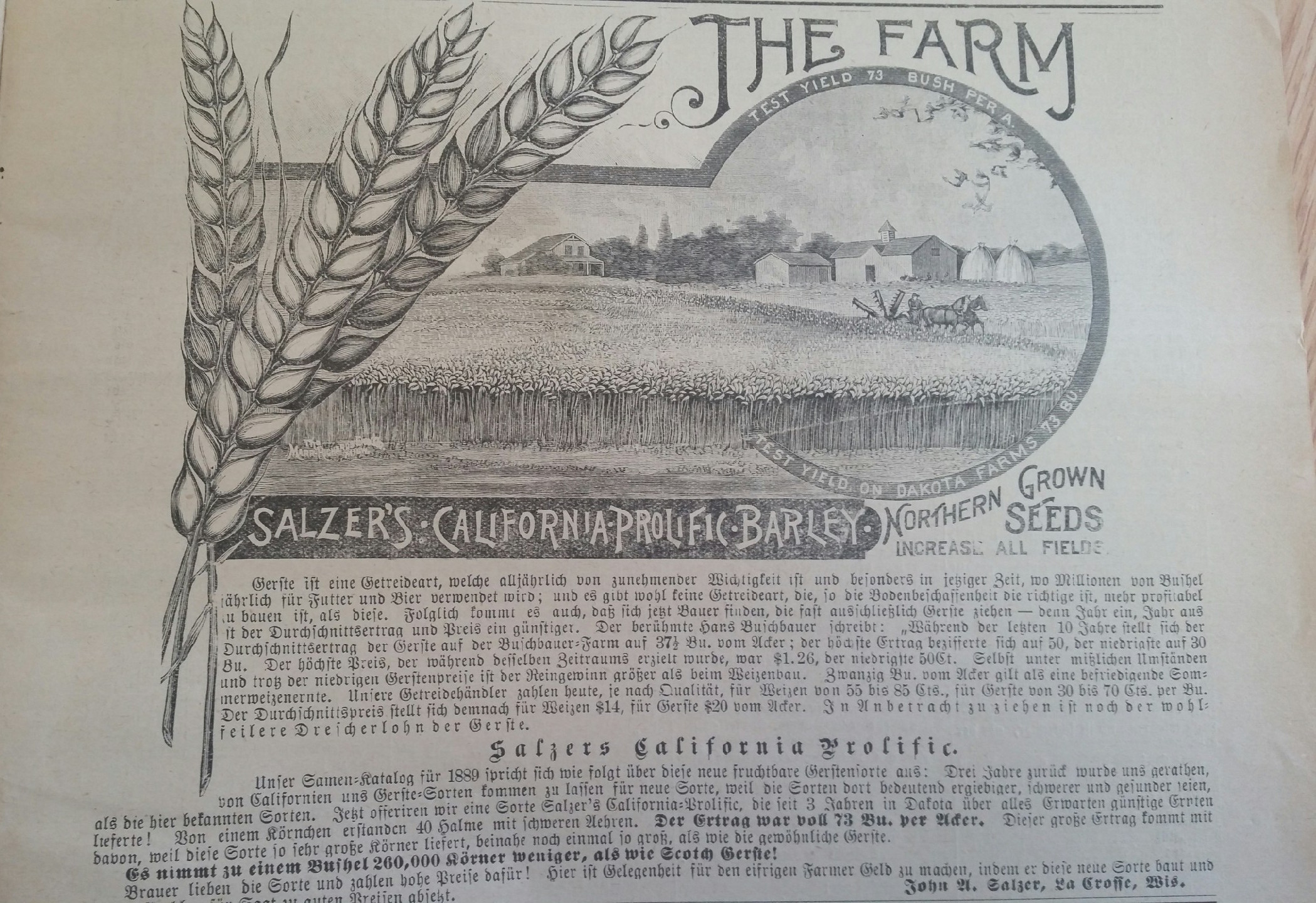
The Acker- and Gartenbau Zeitung was a Milwaukee-based magazine for German speaking farmers in the US. The articles, as seen above, sometimes had their headings in English and content in German.

== Language maintenance ==
=== Schools ===
For the early German settlers, German, not English, was the predominant language used in schools in rural Wisconsin. Teachers were hired from Germany, German textbooks were at first imported, then later printed in the US. By 1854, the Wisconsin State Law declared that all major subjects were to be taught in English; however the state had little authority over local schools, which were locally governed and financed. Schools fully switched to English by the early 20th century, which partially contributed to the gradual decline of German heritage speakers.

== Grammar ==
Previously, researchers have looked at heritage languages to study incomplete acquisition or L1 attrition (Polinsky, 1995; Sorace 2004; Montreal 2008), yet speakers of Wisconsin German do not fit into either of those categories. Modern Wisconsin Heritage German speakers have grown up speaking German in the home, and often only learned English upon entering school, around the age of 6. This means that their German, including grammatical features such as dative, would have already been acquired, if it existed in the speakers' heritage language.

=== Morphosyntax ===
One difference between Wisconsin Heritage German and Standard German and its ancestral dialects are changes in its case marking system, such as the loss of the dative case. In Germany, there exists variation among its different dialects: for instance, in the Rhenish Hesse region, one can still find a three-case marking system (nominative, accusative, dative); in the Eifel, a two-case system; and in the Low German dialectal regions, a single case system. However, in Wisconsin German, while heritage speakers appear to no longer show use of the dative case, they have developed new morphosyntactic features. Across different dialects, heritage speakers have begun marking case in same or similar ways: in some cases, their Differential Object Marking (DOM) would align with Standard German morphology; in other cases, speakers appear to have restructured and reanalysed the DOM to create a new semantic-morphosyntactic system. For example, Yager et al. (2015) cite the following examples to illustrate this phenomenon:

	Wisconsin Heritage German (WHG)			Standard German (SG)		
Example 1: Standard-like dative	im	Boom		im	Baum	
	in the-Dative	tree		in the-Dative	tree	
Example 2: Accusative for SG dative	von ein	Dorf		von einem	Dorf	
	from a-Nominative/Acc	village		from a-Dative	village	
Example 3: Innovative marking	es war	in den	Haus	es war	im	Haus
	It was	in the-Accusative	house	It was	in the-Dative	house

Example 1 shows that Wisconsin German still contains some instances of dative.

In Example 2 a neuter indefinite article has been selected; however it is unclear if it is in the nominative or accusative case. This is a departure from Standard German, where a dative neuter article ("einem") would be used. This is an example of a restructuring of the DOM in Wisconsin German.

Example 3 illustrates innovative case marking: instead of a dative neuter definite article ("dem"), a distinctly masculine accusative definite article has been selected. Heritage speakers could have selected a nominative ("das"), accusative ("das") or dative article ("dem"), but instead not only select an accusative marking but also a masculine article.

This pattern has appeared not only with a single group of heritage speakers, but rather can be found in speakers of different German dialects (such as the Rhenish Hesse, Eifel, and Low German dialects).

== Documentation ==
One of the first recordings of Wisconsin German dialects was made in the 1940s by Lester "Smoky" Seifert (1915–1996), a professor of German at the University of Wisconsin–Madison. Seifert, an East Low German speaker, recorded over 100 written interviews with Wisconsin German speakers, in which he included both linguistic and cultural questions.

== Bibliography ==
- Bungert, Heike, Cora Lee Kluge, and Robert C. Ostergren (eds.). Wisconsin German Land and Life. Madison: Max Kade Institute for German-American Studies, 2006.
- Eichoff, Jurgen (1971). The German Language in America: A Symposium. Austin: University of Texas Press. pp. 43–57.
- Everest Levi, Kate (1898). "Geographical Origin of German Immigration to Wisconsin". In Thwaites, Reuben Gold. Collections of the State Historical Society of Wisconsin XIV. Madison, WI: Democrat Printing Company. pp. 341–393
- Lucht, Felecia (2013). "Older Immigrant Languages". In Purnell, Thomas; Raimy, Eric; Salmons, Joseph. Wisconsin Talk: Linguistic Diversity in the Badger State. Madison, Wisconsin: The University of Wisconsin Press. pp. 26–36. ISBN 978-0-299-29334-5.
- "Wisconsin High German". American Languages: Our Nations Many Voices Online.
