= Community of True Inspiration =

Religious movement

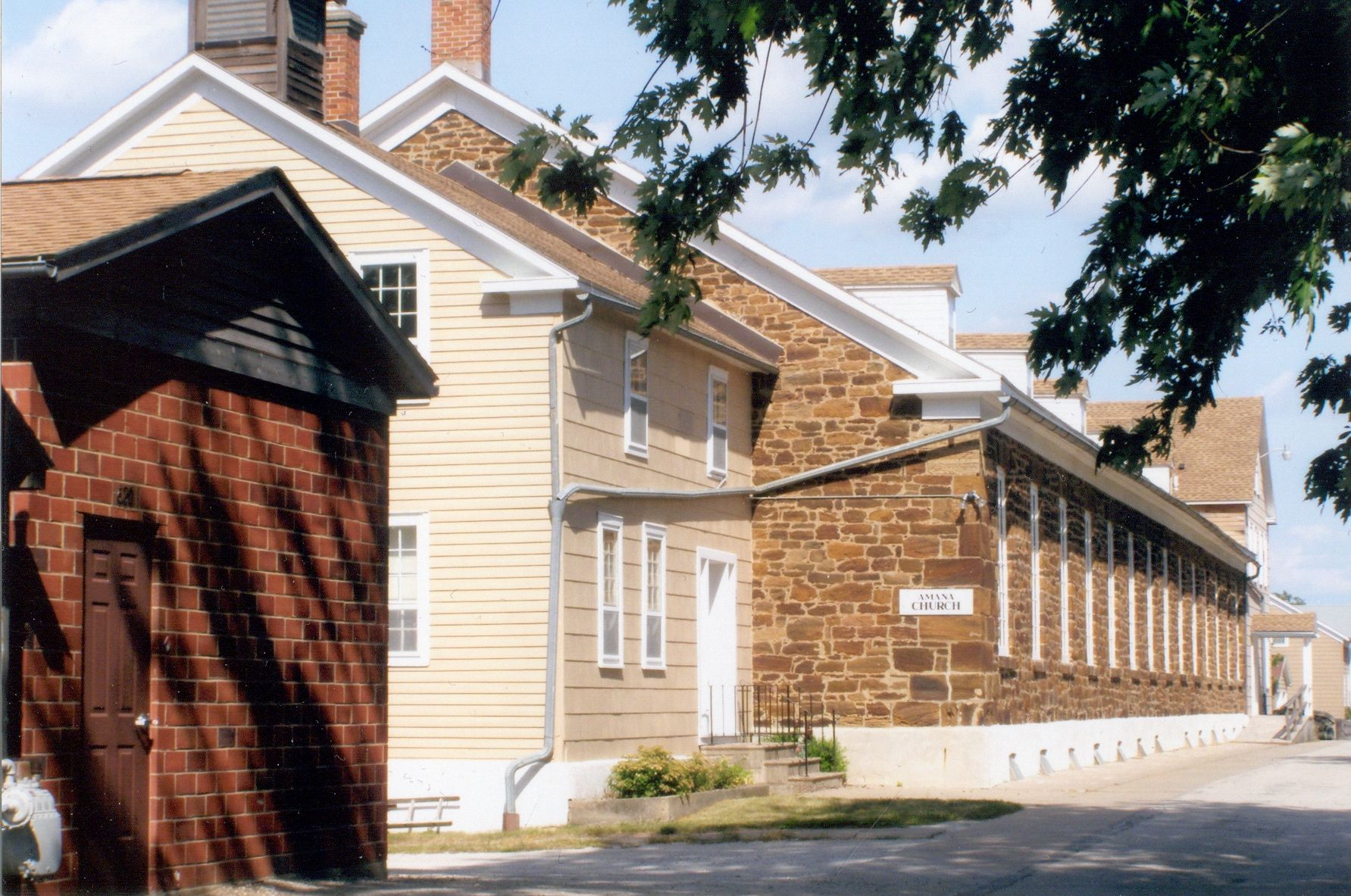
A meetinghouse of the Community of True Inspiration in the Amana Colonies

The Community of True Inspiration, also known as the True Inspiration Congregations, Inspirationalists, and the Amana Church Society) is a Radical Pietist group of Christians descending from settlers of German, Swiss, and Austrian descent who settled in West Seneca, New York, after purchasing land from the Seneca peoples' Buffalo Creek Reservation. They were from a number of backgrounds and socioeconomic areas and later moved to Amana, Iowa (where they are currently based) when they became dissatisfied with the congestion of Erie County and the growth of Buffalo, New York. Christian worship in the Community of True Inspiration continues, largely unchanged from its inception.

== History ==
=== Inspirés ===
From the time of the Edict of Nantes in 1598 until 1685, France had permitted Calvinist Protestants, known as Huguenots, to practice their religion and exercise the full rights of citizens while still maintaining Roman Catholicism as the state religion. However, in 1685, King Louis XIV of France issued the Edict of Fontainebleau which ordered that Huguenot church buildings and schools be closed, and sought to suppress the religion. The Inspirés ('Inspired') were Huguenots in Southern France who radicalized following their suppression and begun an itinerant ministry preaching the end time was at hand with claims of prophetic inspiration. They spent the remainder of the 17th century traveling throughout the Netherlands and England as refugees, before many of them settled in the Pietist center of Halle.

=== Pott brothers ===
The Inspirés influenced three brothers surnamed Pott who lived in Halle until they were exiled and went to Hanau and Wetteravia east of Frankfurt in 1714. The Pott brothers were several of many Pietists who had come to the area to take advantage of the religious tolerance of the counts of Isenburg-Eisenberg. There, they gave what many understood as divinely-inspired ecstatic speeches in a trance-like state. They sometimes experienced uncontrollable jolting motions of their entire bodies while they were preaching, which was understood as verification that they were seized by a divine spirit. Their message was a call to repentance and awakening.

=== Early Inspirationalist movement ===
Many were drawn to the Potts, and the group that gathered around them emerged as a distinct group in the late autumn of 1714. This group is known as the Inspirationalists. Soon, others began preaching in a similar style and experienced similar convulsions. Among these other early leaders were Eberhard Ludwig Gruber, Johann Friedrich Rock, and Ursula Meyer of Thun.

Everywhere the Inspirés and Inspirationalists went, communities gathered around them. However, political freedom was very limited in this era, and the Inspirationalists were routinely banished and were unable to find a place in Europe they could permanently settle. Their religious practices, including avoidance of military service and refusal to take an oath, kept them in conflict with German authorities. Many of these communities were short-lived, and all the leaders continued to travel and were frequently banished by political rulers. Major centers of the Inspirationalists were successively at Himbach near Hanau until 1740, the castle of Gelnhausen until 1753, Lieblos, and then Herrnhaag until the 1820s. The second generation of leaders in the 18th century were Wilhelm Ludwig Kampf and Paul Giesebert Nagel.

Gruber stayed for a time with the community of Brethren in Schwarzenau. However, the Inspirationalists found Brethren to be legalistic, sectarian, and sterile in contrast to their own charismatic and prophetic missionary zeal. Ursula Meyer twice prophesied that Brethren leader Alexander Mack was to meet an early death so that he would not continue to burden his co-religionists. She similarly disapproved of Anabaptist Andreas Boni. The groups ended up competing, and poor relations likely spurred the Brethren to leave Schwarzenau for the Netherlands in 1720.

=== Decline and renewal ===
Their religion continued to grow until Gruber and Rock's deaths, but subsequently declined until a reawakening sparked by Michael Krausert, who preached for a revival and had much support.

=== Migration to North America ===
In the 1840s, renewed religious restrictions and requirements from political rulers prompted the Inspirationalists to migrate as a group to North America. Their first settlements were near Buffalo on both sides of the Niagara River. Sites included West Seneca and the Town of Elma. They immediately began practicing community of goods, working in textiles and agriculture. This settlement became known as the Ebenezer Colonies. They were soon dismayed to find the area crowded, with the urban presence of growing Buffalo too close and conflicts with the Seneca Indians arising. In 1854, many of the Inspirationists moved to the Iowa River Valley to found the Amana Colonies.

Official membership was 1,534 in 1925, and was more than a thousand as late as the 1980s.

== Worship ==
Worship in the Community of True Inspiration is characterized as follows:

Services still follow a basic order of worship beginning with a silent period of worship, followed by a hymn, the recitation of the Apostles Creed by a member of the congregation, a prayer by the presiding elder, the recitation of the Lord's Prayer by the entire congregation followed by a reading from the Bible selected by the presiding elder. Following the presiding elder's commentary, the congregation reads a Psalm, and the service concludes with a second hymn.

In addition to regular services on the Lord's Day, the Community of True Inspiration has several holy days and seasons:

- The season of Advent is marked, as with the celebration of Christmas.
- The Amana Churches have a New Year's Day service to "ask for God's blessing in the coming New Year."
- At the start of Lent, there is a Repentance Service (Buss Versammlung).
- During Holy Week, there are daily church services. Good Friday worship is held to remember the sacrifice of Jesus. Easter celebrates his resurrection.
- Special services are held to mark Ascension Day and Pentecost Day.
- The Faith Review Service (Glaubenslehre) is "dedicated to self-examination and review of the status and strength of one's individual faith in preparation for the Communion Service which is held the following Sunday." The Communion Service is held annually, in the Fall.
- On Thanksgiving Day, a Covenant Service (Bundversammlung) is observed "in which all members publicly signify and renew their personal covenant with God."

== Legacy ==
The Community of True Inspiration Residence was listed on the National Register of Historic Places in 2013.

== Notable members ==
- Conrad Beissel, who joined in 1715 in the German Palatinate, and later founded the Ephrata Cloister
- Barbara Heinemann Landmann
- Christian Metz

== See also ==
- Dunkard Brethren Church
- Unity of the Brethren (Texas)

== Sources ==
- Bowman, C.F. (1995). Brethren Society: The Cultural Transformation of a "Peculiar People". Center Books in Anabaptist Studies. Johns Hopkins University Press. ISBN 978-0-8018-4905-3.
- Durnbaugh, D.F. (1966). Brethren Beginnings: the Origins of the Church of the Brethren in Early Eighteenth-century Europe (Thesis). University Microfilms.
- Lehmann, H.; Van Horn Melton, J.; Strom, J. (2016). Pietism in Germany and North America 1680–1820. Taylor & Francis. ISBN 978-1-351-91120-7.
- Nordhoff, Charles (1875). "The Amana community". The Communistic Societies of the United States. New York City: Harper. ISBN 978-1-4065-5041-2.
- Statistical Profile of Amana at ARDA
