= Amana Colonies =

Seven villages in Iowa, US

- U.S. National Register of Historic Places
- U.S. National Historic Landmark District
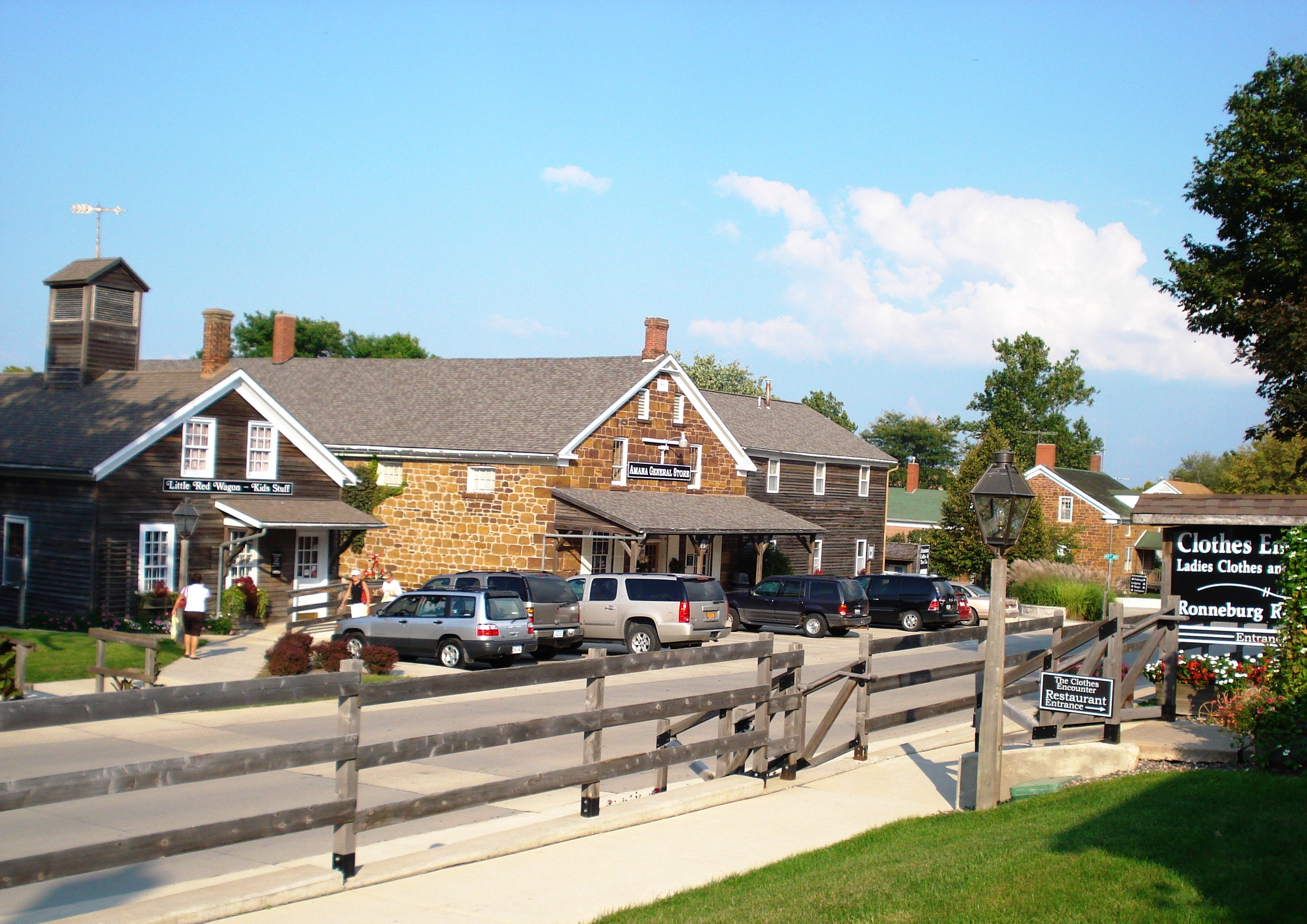
- Nearest city: Middle Amana, Iowa
- Built: 1855
- NRHP reference No.: 66000336

Significant dates
- Added to NRHP: October 15, 1966
- Designated NHLD: June 23, 1965

The Amana Colonies are seven villages on 26,000 acres (110 km^{2}) located in Iowa County in east-central Iowa, United States: Amana (or Main Amana, German: Haupt-Amana), East Amana, High Amana, Middle Amana, South Amana, West Amana, and Homestead. The villages were built and settled by German Radical Pietists, who were persecuted in their homeland by the German state government and the Lutheran Church. Calling themselves the True Inspiration Congregations (German: Wahre Inspirations-Gemeinden), they first settled in New York near Buffalo in what is now the town of West Seneca. However, seeking more isolated surroundings, they moved to Iowa (near present-day Iowa City) in 1856. They lived a communal life until 1932.

For eighty years, the Amana Colony maintained an almost completely self-sufficient local economy, importing very little from the outside industrial economy. The Amanians achieved this independence and lifestyle by adhering to the specialized crafting and farming occupations that they had brought with them from Europe. Craftsmen passed their skills and techniques down from one generation to the next. They used hand, horse, wind, and water power, and made their own furniture, clothes, and other goods. The community voted to form a for-profit organization during the Great Depression, the Amana Society (Amana-Gesellschaft), which included the Amana Corporation.

Today, the Seven Villages of Amana are a tourist attraction known for their restaurants and craft shops. The colony was listed as a National Historic Landmark in 1965.

As of the 2010 Census, the population of the seven villages in order of population was as follows:

- Middle Amana (581)
- Amana (Main Amana) (442)
- South Amana (159)
- Homestead (148)
- West Amana (135)
- High Amana (115)
- East Amana (56)

The Community of True Inspiration (Amana Church) continues to worship in the Middle Amana meeting house, though "Special services, Sunday school, and fellowship activities are held in the larger Main Amana meeting house."

== Early history ==
=== Origins in Europe ===
The Amana Colony stems from a religious movement started in 1714 in Germany by Eberhard L. Gruber and Johann F. Rock. They had both grown displeased with the dogmatism of the Lutheran Church and began to study the Pietist teachings of Philipp Spener. Gruber and Rock fervently spread their beliefs and gained a following originally known as the New Spiritual Economy. They believed that God communicated through individuals with the "gift of inspiration", just as he did in the days of the prophets. This individual was called an instrument (German: Werkzeug) because he was thought to be used as a tool of God's will to speak directly to his people.

To spread their beliefs, the group led by Rock and Gruber traveled through Germany, Switzerland, and the Dutch Republic. The group became known as the Community of True Inspiration, and followers were called Inspirationalists. The Inspirationalists faced the opposition of the governments of the German states because they refused to serve as soldiers and would not send their children to Lutheran public schools. Adherents to the faith were imprisoned, flogged, and stripped of their possessions. To escape persecution, many Inspirationalists moved to Hesse, the most liberal German state at the time. Here, the group attracted more adherents.

Gruber died in 1728 and Rock followed in 1749. Left without an instrument, the Inspirationalists' numbers declined during the subsequent decades. Within a span of a few months starting in 1817, Michael Krausert, Barbara Heinemann, and Christian Metz were all named instruments. Although Krausert soon left the church, Metz and Heinemann were able to revive interest in the Community.

Heinemann retreated from the Community's affairs in 1823, making Metz the sole leader of the church. The Community continued to face persecution from German states for their refusal to serve as soldiers or utilize public schools. In the 1830s, Metz conceived of the notion of leasing a large area of land as a refuge for the Community. They first leased land from a cloister near Ronneburg, then from the Arnsburg Abbey. They expanded to Engelthal Abbey in 1834, and managed all of their land holdings in common. It was at these estates that the philosophy of communal life began to grow within the Community. By the late 1830s, the Community was prospering.

=== Move to America ===
The Hesse government levied harsher fines and rents against the Community in the wake of economic turmoil in the late 1830s. Metz and other leaders realized that they had to find a new home for the Community. On August 27, 1842, leaders of the Community gathered at Armenburg, Germany, to discuss a move to the United States. And the Community arrived in New York on October 26. For the next three months, church leaders examined tracts of land as a site for a new commune. They purchased the 5,000-acre (20 km^{2}) Seneca Indian Reservation near Buffalo, which had recently become open to European settlement following the Second Treaty of Buffalo Creek. The first settlement was called Ebenezer after the Eben-Ezer in the Books of Samuel.

More than 800 members of the Community immigrated to Ebenezer from Germany. The Community founded a "provisional constitution" in 1843 that defined the intentions of the community, which they called the Ebenezer Society. All lands and buildings were to be held in common, and prosperous settlers were expected to pay community expenses. The initial plan was that, after some time, the land would be divided among the people according to their contribution of money and labor. However, leaders saw that the disparity in wealth, skills and age would make it difficult for all to purchase a portion of land—the community would fall apart as a result. Therefore, the constitution was amended on October 23, 1850, to make the Community exclusively communal.

The 5,000-acre (20 km^{2}) purchase was adequate for the first 800 emigrants. However, the success of the community brought new settlers, and by 1854, it was apparent that a larger tract of land was needed. Furthermore, the growth of the nearby city of Buffalo concerned church elders, who thought that it might be a bad influence. Buffalo's growth also increased nearby real estate prices, making an extension to Ebenezer financially unfeasible. Metz met with Community leaders on August 31, 1854, to discuss the situation, and the group sent four men (including Metz) to search for a new home out west. The new Kansas Territory seemed like an ideal location, so the group of four traveled across the new lands. However, they did not agree on an appropriate location.

Two elders were then sent to the state of Iowa to examine the large government land grants. Finding appropriate lands near the Iowa River, they returned to Ebenezer to encourage purchase. The Inspirationalists sent four men to purchase the land and all holdings in the vicinity. The first village in what would become the Amana Colonies was laid out in 1855 (41.8002°N 91.8723°W).

=== Founding ===
The new colony was originally to be named Bleibetreu, German for "remain faithful". However, residents had difficulty pronouncing the word in English. Instead, the Inspirationalists settled on Amana, a Biblical name with similar meaning. Under Iowa law, the Community had to incorporate as a business, so the Amana Society was founded as the governing body in 1859. Shortly thereafter, the Community agreed to adopt a new constitution. The resulting twelve-article document was very similar to the amended Ebenezer Constitution.

One early problem was the lack of rail access; the nearest station was in Iowa City 20 miles (32 km) away. However, in 1861 the Mississippi and Missouri Railroad built a railroad station in nearby Homestead. Recognizing the need for a rail connection, the Community purchased the entire village of Homestead (Heimstätte) (41.7600°N 91.8706°W). This brought their land holdings to 26,000 acres (110 km^{2}): 10,000 acres (40 km^{2}) in timberland, 7,000 acres (28 km^{2}) in cultivated fields, 4,000 acres (16 km^{2}) in grazing land, 500 acres (2.0 km^{2}) in settlements, and 100 acres (40 ha) in vegetable gardens. Most of the land is in Iowa County, with approximately 1,700 acres (690 ha) in Johnson County.

By 1862, five more villages were laid, bringing the total number to seven:

- Amana vor der Höhe (High Amana) (41.8036°N 91.9407°W)
- Süd-Amana (South Amana) (41.7752°N 91.9680°W)
- West-Amana (West Amana) (41.8074°N 91.9654°W)
- Ost-Amana (East Amana) (41.8090°N 91.8493°W)
- Mittel-Amana (Middle Amana) (41.7953°N 91.8982°W)

Each village had a church, school, bakery, dairy, wine-cellar, post office, sawmill, general store, and between forty and one hundred houses. Every able-bodied man was expected to serve in the fire department, and each village had its own fire department. Most houses were two stories and built with local sandstone of an unusual hue. They are mostly square with gable roofs.

The last of the 1,200 Inspirationalist settlers from New York arrived in 1864. By 1908, the Community had grown to 1,800 and owned over $1.8 million in assets.

== Life until 1932 ==
=== Government ===
The Great Council of the Brethren, also known as the Board of Trustees, oversaw the affairs and conduct of the Amana Society. Trustees were expected to tend to the internal affairs of the Society as well as its external business interests. Trustees were elected annually by popular vote from the elders of the Community. The trustees elected out of their own a president, vice president, and secretary; incumbents running for re-election were usually re-elected. The group met alternately in different villages on the first Tuesday of each month. Each June, the trustees were expected to keep the Society informed of the general condition of its affairs. The Great Council also served as the high court of the Community.

Each village was governed by a group of seven to nineteen elders. Decisions were made for each village by the group of elders, led by one of the trustees. This governing board was known as the Bruderrath. Elders were selected based on their piety and spirituality. Werkzeug had the authority to appoint elders, but at times when there were no such individuals, they were selected by the Great Council. The Bruderrath had the authority to appoint foremen for each industry. Individuals could petition the Bruderrath if they sought more money, a larger house, or a lighter workload. The Head Elder had the highest level of authority in each village, even over the Bruderrath trustee.

Each community member was provided with an annual sum, with men receiving $40 to $100 a year depending on their career, women receiving $25 to $30 a year, and parents of children receiving an additional $5 to $10 per child. This money was expected to be spent at village stores. Members who failed to budget adequately would be admonished by the Community. If the member did not mend his ways, they could be expelled by the community. Members who were expelled or voluntarily left the Community would receive all of the money they had invested into the common fund plus interest.

=== Marriage and children ===
Originally, marriage was permitted only "with the consent of God" through the Werkzeug. Marriage was considered a spiritual weakness. Ceremonies were not joyous affairs, but were instead designed to impress the importance of the task upon the couple. Childbearing was similarly discouraged. Views on marriage gradually liberalized, and the Great Council was later given the authority to approve marriage. Men were not allowed to marry until they were 24 years old. If the Great Council found no fault with the union, then the couple could be wed after a year's wait. An elder would bless the marriage and the community would provide a wedding feast. The community did not recognize divorce, and second marriages (even in the case of a widow) were considered particularly reprehensible. A citizen would be expelled from the community for one year for marrying an individual outside of the colonies, even if the partner wished to join the society.

=== Dining ===
There was no cooking in the homes of Amana citizens; instead, citizens originally ate together in groups of thirty to forty-five. Communal kitchens, each with its own garden, hosted meals. Men sat at one table while women and small children sat at another. Prayers were said in German before and after meals. Meals were not considered social affairs so conversation was discouraged.

The community had fifty-five communal kitchens: sixteen in Amana, ten in Middle Amana, nine in Homestead, six in South and West Amana, and four in East and High Amana. The kitchen boss (Küchebaas) was tasked with kitchen operations: cooking, serving, preserving, and chicken husbandry. Kitchen personnel were appointed by the Bruderrat. Communal kitchens were usually large, two-story structures with an attached residence for the Küchebaas. Kitchens typically had a large brick hearth stove, a wood- or coal-burning oven, and a 6-foot-long (1.8 m) sink. Though kitchens originally had to bring water from the nearest well, they were the first buildings to be connected to the colony waterworks. Kitchens were named after the Küchebaas. The communal kitchen concept eroded some time around 1900, as married residents began to eat in their own homes. Food was still cooked in the communal kitchens, but housewives would take the food home. Kitchen staff and single residents still ate in the communal kitchens.

Each kitchen operated individually and had different practices. However, menus were largely standardized across the colonies to prevent any residents from receiving more than their fair share. On Saturday nights, pork sausages or pork rinds, boiled potatoes, cottage cheese with chives, bread with cream cheese, and streusel were served. The noon meal on Sunday was rice soup, fried potatoes, creamed spinach, boiled beef, streusel, and tea or coffee. Menus changed with the seasons; for example, more beef and pork was served in the autumn and winter because it was easier to keep fresh meat.

=== Work ===
Common positions held by women were in the kitchens, communal gardens, and laundry, among eight occupations. Men on the other hand had 39 different jobs to choose from, including barber, butcher, tailor, machine shop worker, and doctor. Children also participated in jobs, such as harvesting and agricultural duties for boys and kitchen work for the girls. Children stayed with their mothers until they were two years old. Then, the child would have to attend Kinderschule until the age of seven. At that point, the child would attend school six days a week, all year round until the age of fourteen or fifteen. At school, they shelled, cleaned and graded seed corn, picked fruit, and studied reading, writing and arithmetic.

Amana was known for its hospitality towards outsiders. Members would never turn a person in need away. They fed and sheltered the homeless who passed through on the train. Some were hired as laborers. They received good wages, a permit home for the length of their stay and three meals a day in the communal kitchen. The homeless were not the only outside help. Amana hired many outside laborers to do industrial and agricultural jobs. They worked in the woolen shop, the calico-printing shop or the many other workplaces.

=== Worship ===
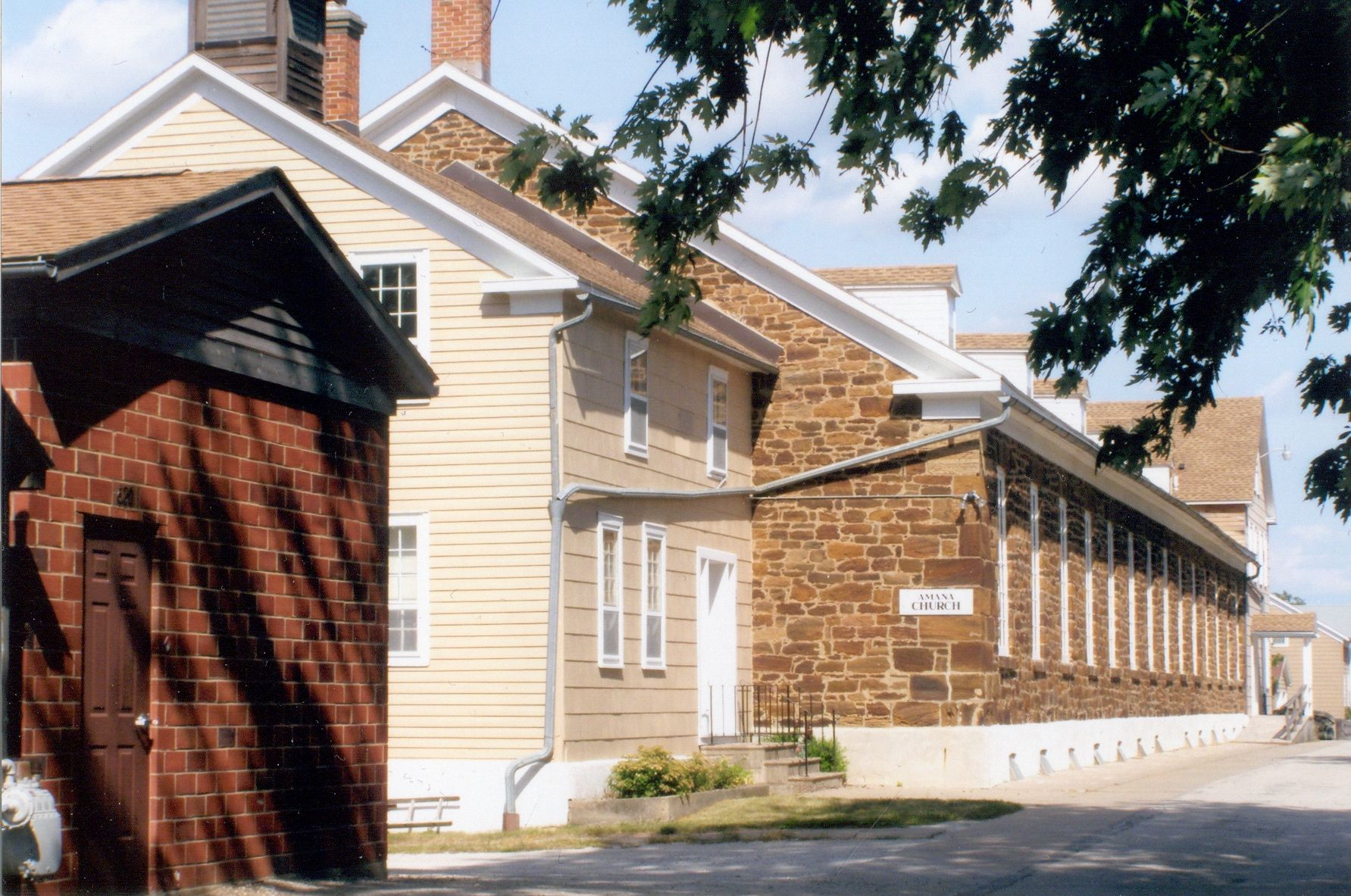
Amana Church

Another important governing aspect of the society was the church, which was run by the board of trustees. Children and their parents worshiped together. Mothers with young children sat in the back of the church. Other children sat in the first few rows. Men and women were separated during worship: men on one side and women on the other side of the church (this practice continues to this day). Older people and the "in-betweens" who were people in their thirties and forties had to attend a separate service. The service that members attended and where the members sat was a statement of their status in society. Services were held eleven times a week and did not include musical instruments and hymn singing.

=== Amana and the outside world ===
Amana interacted with the outside world in two ways, buying and selling. Each village had a center of exchange where all goods were purchased. By the 1890s, these stores were buying a great amount of goods and raw materials from the outside world. Just Middle Amana alone had more than 732 invoices from outside companies. Amana purchased things deemed necessary to run the society efficiently, such as raw wool, oil, grease, starch, pipes and fittings. Most of the grain for the flour-mill was purchased from the outside, and the printing establishment used cotton goods from the southern states. Amana may have been an economically isolated society only in a small sense.

=== Great Change ===
In March 1931, after the onset of the Great Depression, the Great Council disclosed to the Amana Society that the villages were in dire financial condition. The Colony felt the Depression particularly harshly because a fire had badly damaged the woolen mill and destroyed the flour mill less than ten years earlier. At the same time, Society members were seeking more personal freedom. The Society agreed to split into two organizations: The non-profit Amana Church Society oversaw the spiritual needs of the community, while the for-profit Amana Society was incorporated as a joint-stock company. The transition was completed in 1932 and came to be known in the community as the Great Change.

== Since the Great Change ==
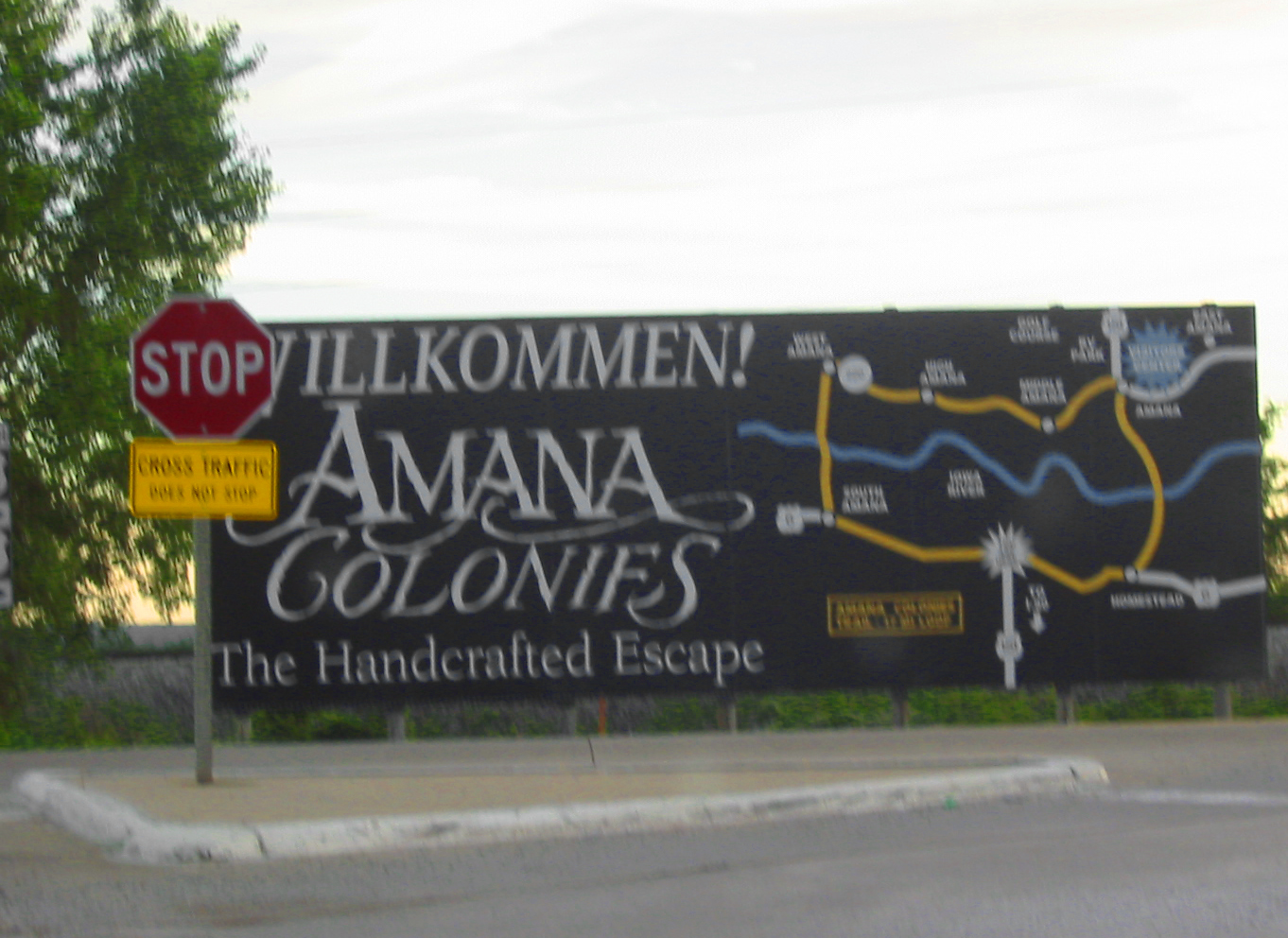
Wilkommen to Amana Colonies, roadside sign

Most residents of the Amana Colony are considered tri-lingual. They speak American English, High German (Hochdeutsch), and a dialect known as Amana German (Kolonie-Deutsch). The language is High German in origin, but has strong influences of American English. For example, the word for rhubarb is Piestengel, combining the English word "pie" with the German word for stalk or stem.

The Amana Society, Inc., corporate heir to the land and economic assets of communal Amana, owns and manages some 26,000 acres (110 km^{2}) of farm, pasture and forest land. Agriculture is an important economic base today just as it was in communal times. Because the land was not divided up with the end of communalism, the landscape of Amana still reflects its communal heritage. In addition, more than 450 communal-era buildings stand in the seven villages as vivid reminders of the past. On June 23, 1965, the National Park Service deemed the Amana Colonies worthy of distinction as a National Historic Landmark. When the National Register of Historic Places was founded a year later, the Colonies were automatically listed.

Amana Farms is home to Iowa's largest privately held forest. Amana Farms has built a 1,600,000 US gal (6,100 m^{3}) anaerobic digester with funding from the Iowa Office of Energy Independence, which produces fertilizer, heat for buildings, and methane for generating electricity. The digester processes organic waste streams from industrial partners such as Genencor International, Cargill and the International Paper Cedar River Mill, as well as manure, thereby reducing local methane emissions.

=== Amana Refrigeration ===
The most widely known business enterprise that emerged from the Amana Society is Amana Refrigeration, Inc. George C. Foerstner worked in the woolen mill and became a traveling salesman for the mill after the Great Change. With the repeal of Prohibition in 1933, Foerstner recognized the need for beverage coolers. He started the Electric Equipment Company in 1934 using $3,500 of his own savings. The company was sold to the Amana Society in 1936 and renamed the Electrical Department of the Amana Society, though Foerstner remained as manager. The company was twice awarded the Army-Navy "E" Award during World War II for filling military contracts. Goods were produced in the Middle Amana woolen mill.

In 1947, the company produced the first commercial upright freezer. Two years later, the Amana Society sold off the Electrical Department to an investment group organized by Foerstner. Renamed Amana Refrigeration, Inc., the company grew to manufacture refrigerators and air conditioners. The Raytheon Corporation purchased Amana Refrigeration on January 1, 1965, although the Amana division was mostly autonomous. Amana produced the first practical commercial microwave oven in 1967. The division was sold to Goodman Global in 1997 and then sold to Maytag in 2001. It became part of the Whirlpool Corporation when it purchased Maytag in 2006. Whirlpool sold the Amana, Iowa refrigerator plant property to Wramia001, a Chicago-based limited liability company, in October, 2020 for $92.6 million. Amana will continue to manufacture Amana, JennAir, KitchenAid, Maytag and Whirlpool refrigerators at the plant, built in 1940, under a long-term lease agreement.

=== Tourism ===
Today, heritage tourism has become important to the economy of the Amana area. Hotels and bed and breakfasts support the tourist industry, as does many independent shops, local artists and craftspeople, and restaurants that serve family-style meals. Historic preservation efforts by several local non-profit organizations, as well as the Amana Society, Inc., in conjunction with governmental, land-use and historic preservation ordinances, attempt to preserve the natural and built environment of Amana.

=== Education ===
Clear Creek–Amana Community School District operates public schools serving the community. Amana Elementary School is in Middle Amana, and Clear Creek–Amana Middle School and Clear Creek–Amana High School are in Tiffin.

Amana High School in Middle Amana was established after a 1935 bond election. The school closed in 1991. Clear Creek–Amana Middle School was previously in Middle Amana.

== Notable people ==
- Barbara Heinemann Landmann – spiritual leader
- Christian Metz – spiritual leader
- William Henry Prestele – lithographer
- Joanna E. Schanz – basket maker
- Bill Zuber – professional baseball player

== See also ==
- List of National Historic Landmarks in Iowa
- National Register of Historic Places listings in Iowa County, Iowa

== Footnotes ==
=== Sources ===
- Hillquit, Morris (1903). History of socialism in the United States. New York, NY: Funk & Wagnalls company.
- Hoppe, Emilie (1998). Seasons of Plenty: Amana Communal Cooking. Iowa City, IA: University of Iowa Press. ISBN 978-1587295645.
- Horton, Loren O. (2005). Uniquely Iowa. State Studies: Uniquely. Heinemann-Raintree. ISBN 978-1403446473.
- Hudson, David; Bergman, Marvin; Horton, Loren, eds. (2009). The Biographical Dictionary of Iowa. Iowa City, IA: University Of Iowa Press. ISBN 978-1587296857.
- Shambaugh, Bertha Maude Horack (1908). Amana: The Community of True Inspiration. Iowa City, IA: The State Historical Society of Iowa.
- Webber, Philip E. (2009). Kolonie-Deutsch: Life and Language in Amana. Iowa City, IA: University Of Iowa Press. ISBN 978-1587298301.
