= Oxford, Iowa =

- City
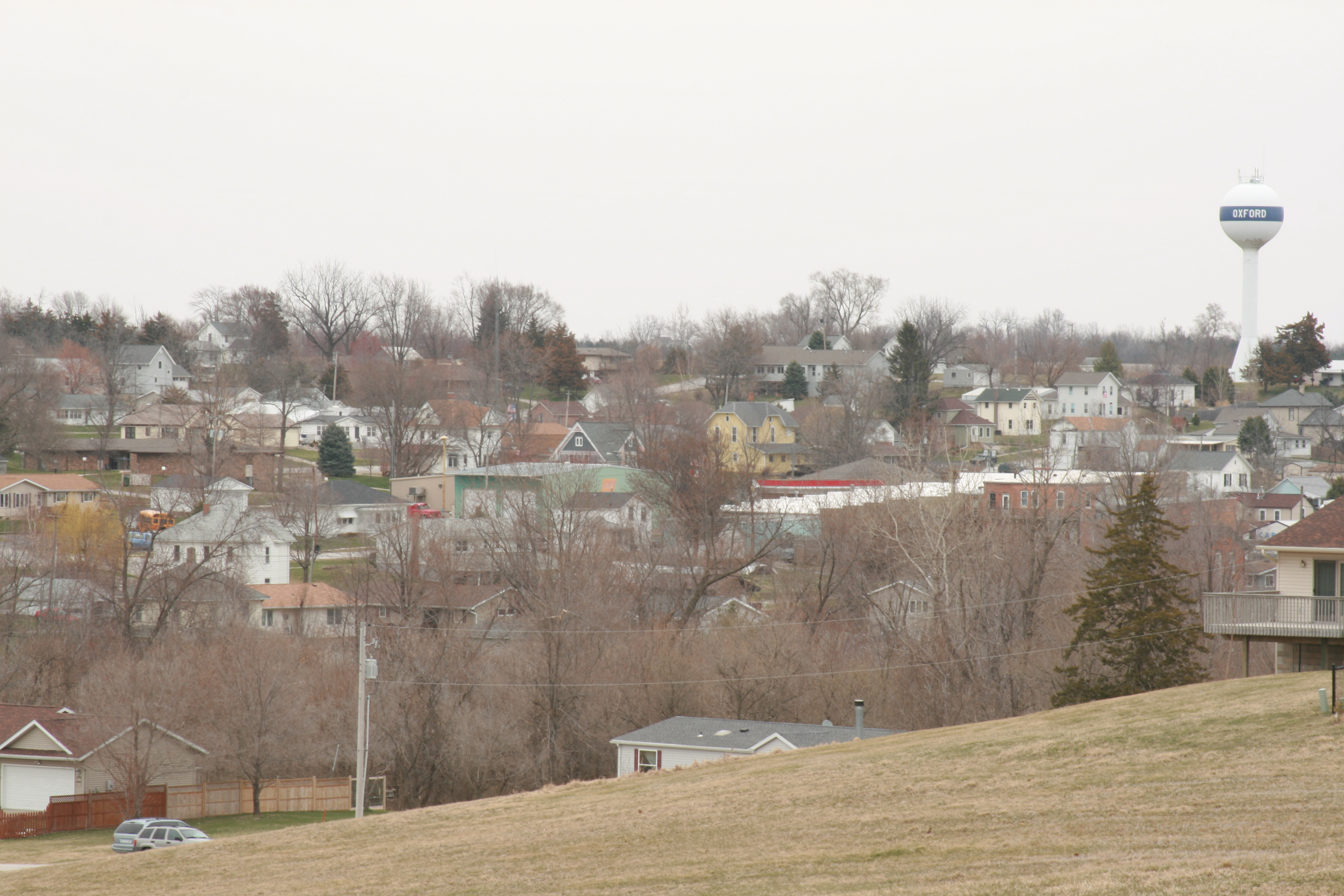
- View of Oxford from 295th Street in 2006

- Location of Oxford, Iowa
- Coordinates: 41°43′22″N 91°47′28″W
- Country: United States
- State: Iowa
- County: Johnson
- Incorporated: April 8, 1881

Area
  - Total: 0.92 sq mi (2.39 km^{2})
  - Land: 0.92 sq mi (2.39 km^{2})
  - Water: 0 sq mi (0.00 km^{2})
- Elevation: 738 ft (225 m)

Population (2020)
  - Total: 722
  - Density: 780.9/sq mi (301.52/km^{2})
- Time zone: UTC-6 (Central (CST))
  - Summer (DST): UTC-5 (CDT)
- ZIP code: 52322
- Area code: 319
- FIPS code: 19-60645
- GNIS feature ID: 2396117
- Website: www.oxfordiowa.com

Oxford is a city in Johnson County, Iowa, United States. It is part of the Iowa City, Iowa Metropolitan Statistical Area. The population was 722 at the time of the 2020 census.

== History ==
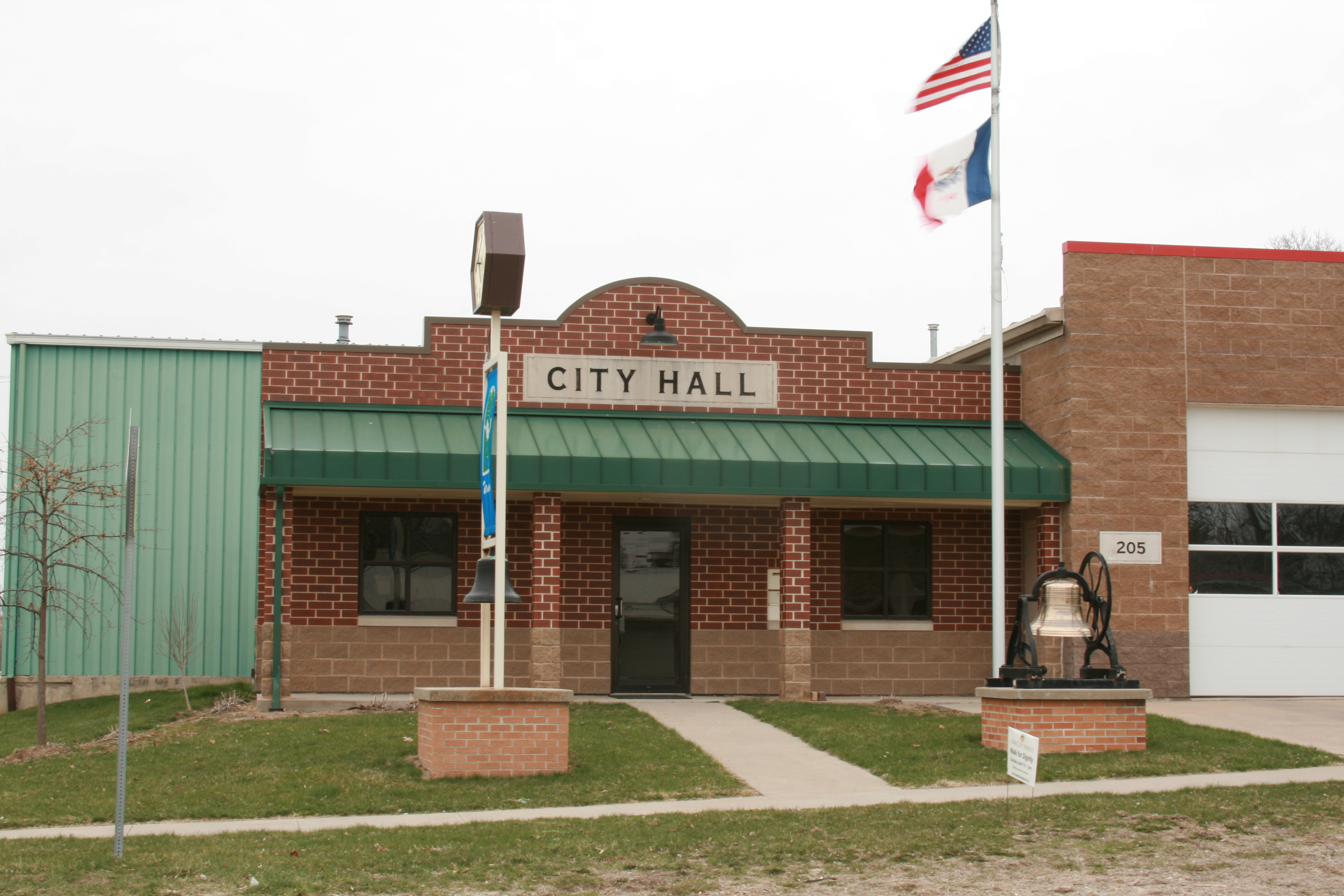
Oxford's City Hall and Fire Department

Oxford was platted in 1868. It is named from Oxford Township, which takes its name from Oxford, New York.

== Geography ==
According to the United States Census Bureau, the city has a total area of 0.91 square miles (2.36 km^{2}), all land.

== Demographics ==
Historical populations
Year	Pop.	±%
1880	560	—
1890	515	−8.0%
1900	664	+28.9%
1910	614	−7.5%
1920	580	−5.5%
1930	521	−10.2%
1940	542	+4.0%
1950	543	+0.2%
1960	633	+16.6%
1970	666	+5.2%
1980	676	+1.5%
1990	663	−1.9%
2000	705	+6.3%
2010	807	+14.5%
2020	722	−10.5%
Source:"U.S. Census website". United States Census Bureau. and Iowa Data Center; Source: U.S. Decennial Census

=== 2020 census ===
As of the census of 2020, there were 722 people, 318 households, and 200 families residing in the city. The population density was 780.9 inhabitants per square mile (301.5/km^{2}). There were 337 housing units at an average density of 364.5 per square mile (140.7/km^{2}). The racial makeup of the city was 92.4% White, 0.3% Black or African American, 0.4% Native American, 0.3% Asian, 0.0% Pacific Islander, 0.8% from other races and 5.8% from two or more races. Hispanic or Latino persons of any race comprised 3.5% of the population.

Of the 318 households, 28.6% of which had children under the age of 18 living with them, 46.9% were married couples living together, 10.4% were cohabitating couples, 27.7% had a female householder with no spouse or partner present and 15.1% had a male householder with no spouse or partner present. 37.1% of all households were non-families. 30.2% of all households were made up of individuals, 11.6% had someone living alone who was 65 years old or older.

The median age in the city was 40.5 years. 25.3% of the residents were under the age of 20; 3.3% were between the ages of 20 and 24; 27.8% were from 25 and 44; 26.0% were from 45 and 64; and 17.5% were 65 years of age or older. The gender makeup of the city was 46.5% male and 53.5% female.

=== 2010 census ===
As of the census of 2010, there were 807 people, 336 households, and 216 families living in the city. The population density was 886.8 inhabitants per square mile (342.4/km^{2}). There were 350 housing units at an average density of 384.6 per square mile (148.5/km^{2}). The racial makeup of the city was 92.9% White, 3.3% African American, 1.5% Asian, 0.1% from other races, and 2.1% from two or more races. Hispanic or Latino of any race were 2.4% of the population.

There were 336 households, of which 34.5% had children under the age of 18 living with them, 45.5% were married couples living together, 14.6% had a female householder with no husband present, 4.2% had a male householder with no wife present, and 35.7% were non-families. 30.1% of all households were made up of individuals, and 11.6% had someone living alone who was 65 years of age or older. The average household size was 2.40 and the average family size was 2.99.

The median age in the city was 35.5 years. 28.4% of residents were under the age of 18; 6.4% were between the ages of 18 and 24; 27.2% were from 25 to 44; 26.4% were from 45 to 64; and 11.5% were 65 years of age or older. The gender makeup of the city was 48.2% male and 51.8% female.

=== 2000 census ===
As of the census of 2000, there were 705 people, 279 households, and 189 families living in the city. The population density was 1,346.3 inhabitants per square mile (519.8/km^{2}). There were 286 housing units at an average density of 546.2 per square mile (210.9/km^{2}). The racial makeup of the city was 98.44% White, 0.14% Native American, 0.71% Asian, and 0.71% from two or more races. Hispanic or Latino of any race were 0.14% of the population.

There were 279 households, out of which 34.1% had children under the age of 18 living with them, 54.8% were married couples living together, 8.6% had a female householder with no husband present, and 31.9% were non-families. 28.0% of all households were made up of individuals, and 10.0% had someone living alone who was 65 years of age or older. The average household size was 2.53 and the average family size was 3.09.

In the city, the population was spread out, with 27.8% under the age of 18, 7.5% from 18 to 24, 30.9% from 25 to 44, 22.1% from 45 to 64, and 11.6% who were 65 years of age or older. The median age was 36 years. For every 100 females, there were 98.0 males. For every 100 females age 18 and over, there were 93.5 males.

The median income for a household in the city was $37,292, and the median income for a family was $48,750. Males had a median income of $31,029 versus $27,500 for females. The per capita income for the city was $18,335. About 3.2% of families and 3.6% of the population were below the poverty line, including none of those under age 18 and 5.3% of those age 65 or over.

== Education ==
Clear Creek–Amana Community School District operates public schools serving the community. Clear Creek Elementary School is in Oxford, and Clear Creek–Amana Middle School and Clear Creek–Amana High School are in Tiffin.

== The Oxford Project ==
The Oxford Project is a book capturing the stories of 100 Oxford residents, along with photographs of them taken 20 years apart. Photographer Peter Feldstein (himself an Oxford resident) took photographs of all but three of his neighbors during 1984. In 2005 and 2006, he returned with writer Stephen G. Bloom to take updated photos and interview as many of those original residents as possible.
