= WaMaC Conference =

Iowa High School athletic conference

- Conference: IHSAA / IGHSAU
- Founded: 1941
- Sports fielded: 21; men's: 11; women's: 10
- No. of teams: 12
- Region: Eastern Iowa
- Website: www.wamacconference.org

The WaMaC conference is a high school athletic conference in Eastern Iowa made up of mid-sized schools. The conference is named for the three rivers that drain in the area (Wa for Wapsipinicon, Ma for Maquoketa, and C for Cedar). WaMaC also participates in concert choir and concert band performances, calling them WaMaC Honor Choirs and WaMaC Honor Bands, where instead of competing, the schools perform together. There is also a WaMaC art show.

== Members ==
There are 12 full members of the WaMaC Conference. The majority of these schools are in Class 3A, Iowa's second largest enrollment class.

Institution	Location	Mascot	Colors	Affiliation	2026-2027 BEDS
Benton Community	Van Horne	Bobcats		Public	366
Center Point–Urbana	Center Point	Stormin' Pointers		Public	302
Clear Creek–Amana	Tiffin	Clippers		Public	626
Grinnell	Grinnell	Tigers		Public	370
Independence	Independence	Mustangs		Public	376
Marion	Marion	Wolves		Public	531
Mount Vernon	Mount Vernon	Mustangs		Public	333
Solon	Solon	Spartans		Public	348
South Tama County	Tama	Trojans		Public	322
Vinton-Shellsburg	Vinton	Vikings		Public	310
West Delaware	Manchester	Hawks		Public	318
Williamsburg	Williamsburg	Raiders		Public	294

== History ==
The conference traces its history to 1931. This is the year the Tri Valley Conference was formed. Membership in the conference included Independence, Marion, Manchester, and Vinton. Cedar Falls and Cedar Rapids Wilson joined later.

In 1940, a new league, the Mid-Six, was formed. This new conference consisted of Anamosa, Maquoketa, Manchester, Marion, Monticello, and Tipton. Independence and Vinton rejoined the league in 1942 and the conference was renamed the Tri-Rivers Conference. After a year of competing under that moniker, the league was renamed the WaMaC Conference to honor the three rivers that run through the region, the Wapsipinicon, the Maquoketa, and the Cedar.

=== Membership changes ===
In the 1988–89 season, Anamosa, Monticello, and Maquoketa left the conference to join a redesigned Big Bend Conference. They were replaced in the league by Benton Community and LaSalle Catholic of the recently disbanded Eastern Iowa Conference, and by LaSalle's crosstown rival, Regis. Tipton also left at this time to join the Eastern Iowa Hawkeye Conference. South Tama County would be added soon after. After Regis left to join the larger Mississippi Valley Conference in 1992, Columbus Catholic in Waterloo replaced them. Don Bosco joined the conference in 1998, as Regis closed its doors in order for Cedar Rapids to open a new, larger Catholic High School made up of the former populations of LaSalle and Regis.

The real expansion for the WaMaC began in 2003. Western Dubuque, Central DeWitt, Maquoketa, and Beckman were added to the league this year. After originally being denied membership in the league, this expansion only occurred because the four schools petitioned to the state for inclusion in the WaMaC following the collapse of their former conference, the Big Bend. Three other teams that made up the Big Bend had agreed to leave the conference for the Tri-Rivers Conference, while Camanche (the other remaining team) applied to the Big East Conference. The WaMaC opposed the addition of the teams because there was little tradition with the other league schools and the increased travel distance appeared to threaten South Tama's membership in the league, while the addition of more big schools like Central DeWitt and Western Dubuque threatened the membership of Don Bosco, which was by far the league's smallest school. It turned out that both fears proved valid. Don Bosco left the league for the Iowa Star Conference in 2005 and South Tama joined the Little Hawkeye Conference for 2006. In 2013, Waterloo Columbus left the WaMaC for the NICL Conference with South Tama joining back in the WaMaC at the start of the 2014 season.

In 2007, the league added two Tri-River Conference members, Anamosa (who had been a member of the conference in its early days and had recently been in the Big Bend conference with the other 4 schools that had joined the conference in 2003), and Center Point–Urbana. In 2008, the league expanded to add four of the larger schools in the Eastern Iowa Hawkeye Conference, all of which were also rapidly growing schools. These four were Clear Creek–Amana, Mount Vernon, Solon, and Williamsburg.

=== Successes ===
The new 16 team league has gained much credibility at the end of the decade, due to the success of its schools.

In the 2009–10 academic year, the WaMaC fielded many state championship teams in boys' sports: Solon won the 2009 Class 2A State Football Championship; Columbus Catholic, Waterloo, claimed the Class 1A State Tennis Championship in June 2010; and Solon claimed the Class 2A State Championship in Track & Field; Solon also won the Class 2A State Baseball tournament.

In the 2009–10 academic year in girls' sports, Mount Vernon claimed the Class 2A State Volleyball Championship. Mount Vernon also won the Class 2A State Basketball Championship. Solon won the Class 2A State Track & Field Championship.

In the 2010–11 school year, the conference has enjoyed much of the same success. Solon claimed the Class 3A Football State Championship after moving up a class from the previous year. Solon also won the Class 3A State Baseball tournament, defeating Marion in the semifinals.

In girls' sports, Mount Vernon defeated West Delaware to capture the Class 3A State Championship in Volleyball, and capped a perfect season. Columbus Catholic, Waterloo, claimed the Class 1A State Girls Tennis Championship. Clear Creek–Amana won the 2011 Class 3A Softball tournament.

=== Late 2010s/early 2020s league departures ===
In January 2017, two schools opted to leave the conference. Western Dubuque voted to join the Mississippi Valley Conference, while Anamosa is joining the River Valley Conference. Both moves became effective in 2018–19, leaving the WaMaC at 14 schools.

In the spring of 2019, Central DeWitt was admitted to the Mississippi Athletic Conference, with the move effective in the fall of 2020, reducing the WaMaC to 13 teams.

In the summer of 2021, Maquoketa and Dyersville Beckman Catholic announced they planned to leave the WaMaC for the River Valley Conference. When the move takes place for the 2022-2023 school year, the WaMaC will be reduced to 11 teams.

In the fall of 2022 Grinnell-Newberg High School voted to join the WaMaC Conference after leaving the Little Hawkeye Conference. This brings the WaMaC to 12 teams.

After a special Conference Realignment Committee was formed and met, the committee voted 8-5 for Decorah Community School District and 13-0 for Waverly-Shell Rock Community School District to be admitted into the WaMaC. The rest of the conference have 60 days to vote to accept the schools.

== WaMaC Honor Band and Honor Choir ==
The WaMaC Conference also holds events for students involved in band and choir. These events are the WaMaC Honor Band and WaMaC Honor Choir. These events have been held at various venues throughout eastern Iowa and take place in November with Honor Choir taking place on the first or second Tuesday and Honor Band takes place a week later. The students involved in these events will arrive at the certain venue usually in the early afternoon. Then, the students rehearse together with the songs they'll either play or sing together. This rehearsal usually lasts about two-and-a-half to three hours with a break and dinner in-between. Finally, a concert is held that night.

Honor Band and Honor Choir have taken place at various venues throughout the years. In the past, the Honor Choir has been held at Hawkeye Community College (2009), Maquoketa High School (2010), and Independence High School (2011). In the past, the Honor Band has been held at Center Point–Urbana High School (2009), Benton Community High School (2010), and Clear Creek–Amana High School (2011).
