= Curt Ritchie =

American football coach

Current position
- Title: Head coach
- Team: Cornell (IA)
- Conference: MWC
- Record: 4–6

Biographical details
- Education: University of Iowa (1991); Drake University (2008)

Coaching career (HC unless noted)
- 1993–2000: English Valleys HS (IA)
- 2001–2024: Williamsburg HS (IA)
- 2025–present: Cornell (IA)

Head coaching record
- Overall: 4–6 (college); 229–97 (high school) (Note: English Valleys ended the 1996 season 6–3 but had to forfeit three wins due to an ineligible player.)

Curt Ritchie is an American college football coach. He is the head football coach for Cornell College, a position he has held since 2025. He was the head football coach for English Valleys High School from 1993 to 2000 and Williamsburg High School from 2001 to 2024.

== Head coaching record ==
=== College ===
Year	Team	Overall	Conference	Standing	Bowl/playoffs
Cornell Rams (Midwest Conference) (2025–present)
2025	Cornell	4–6	4–5	6th	
2026	Cornell	0–0	0–0		
Cornell:		4–6	4–5		
Total:		4–6			

=== High school ===
Year	Team	Overall	Conference	Standing	Bowl/playoffs
English Valleys Bears () (1993–2000)
1993	English Valleys	1–8			
1994	English Valleys	6–3			
1995	English Valleys	4–5			
1996	English Valleys	3–6	3–3		
1997	English Valleys	3–6			
1998	English Valleys	7–2	5–2		
1999	English Valleys	6–3			
2000	English Valleys	8–3			
English Valleys:		38–36			
Williamsburg Raiders () (2001–2024)
2001	Williamsburg	9–1			
2002	Williamsburg	12–1			
2003	Williamsburg	7–3			
2004	Williamsburg	4–5	3–4	6th	
2005	Williamsburg	8–4	6–1	2nd	
2006	Williamsburg	9–1	7–0	1st	
2007	Williamsburg	5–4	3–4	5th	
2008	Williamsburg	8–2	5–1	2nd	
2009	Williamsburg	7–2	6–0	1st	
2010	Williamsburg	10–2	6–1	2nd	
2011	Williamsburg	5–4	3–3	5th	
2012	Williamsburg	10–2	4–0	1st	
2013	Williamsburg	6–3	3–1	2nd	
2014	Williamsburg	11–1	6–0	1st	
2015	Williamsburg	7–4	5–1	2nd	
2016	Williamsburg	7–2	5–1	2nd	
2017	Williamsburg	8–3	4–2	2nd	
2018	Williamsburg	7–4	5–0	1st	
2019	Williamsburg	8–4	5–0	1st	
2020	Williamsburg	8–1	5–0	1st	
2021	Williamsburg	8–4	5–0	1st	
2022	Williamsburg	12–1	5–0	1st	
2023	Williamsburg	11–1	3–1	2nd	
2024	Williamsburg	7–3	4–1	2nd	
Williamsburg:		204–62			
Total:		229–97			
National championship Conference title Conference division title or championship game berth
