= Jack Cochrane =

American football player (born 1999)

No. 43 – Kansas City Chiefs
- Position: Linebacker
- Roster status: Active

Personal information
- Born: February 9, 1999 (age 27); Mount Vernon, Iowa, U.S.
- Listed height: 6 ft 3 in (1.91 m)
- Listed weight: 236 lb (107 kg)

Career information
- High school: Mount Vernon (IA)
- College: South Dakota (2017–2021)
- NFL draft: 2022: undrafted

Career history
- Kansas City Chiefs (2022–present)

Awards and highlights
- 2× Super Bowl champion (LVII, LVIII); First-team All-MVFC (2021); Second-team All-MVFC (2019)

Career NFL statistics as of Week 6, 2026
- Total tackles: 79
- Fumble recoveries: 2
- Pass deflections: 3
- Interceptions: 2
- Stats at Pro Football Reference

Jack Cochrane (born February 9, 1999) is an American professional football linebacker for the Kansas City Chiefs of the National Football League (NFL). He played college football for the South Dakota Coyotes.

== College career ==
Cochrane was a member of the South Dakota Coyotes for five seasons. Cochrane used the extra year of eligibility granted to college athletes in 2020 due to the COVID-19 pandemic and returned to South Dakota for a fifth season. He finished the season with 103 tackles.

== Professional career ==
Pre-draft measurables
Height	Weight	Arm length	Hand span	Wingspan	40-yard dash	10-yard split	20-yard split	20-yard shuttle	Three-cone drill	Vertical jump	Broad jump	Bench press
6 ft 3 in (1.91 m)	236 lb (107 kg)	31 1/8 in (0.79 m)	9 1/2 in (0.24 m)	6 ft 4 in (1.93 m)	4.65 s	1.60 s	2.71 s	4.10 s	7.27 s	41.0 in (1.04 m)	10 ft 4 in (3.15 m)	19 reps
All values from Pro Day

Cochrane signed with the Kansas City Chiefs as an undrafted free agent on May 1, 2022. He was waived on August 30, and was re-signed to the practice squad the following day. Cochrane was signed to the Chiefs' active roster on September 13. Cochrane won Super Bowl LVII when the Chiefs defeated the Philadelphia Eagles 38–35 with Cochrane recording one tackle in the game. Cochrane won his second straight Super Bowl when the Chiefs defeated the San Francisco 49ers 25–22 in Super Bowl LVIII.

Cochrane re-signed with the Chiefs on March 11, 2024. On December 23, 2024, the Chiefs placed Cochrane on injured reserve.

On April 11, 2025, Cochrane re-signed with the Chiefs on a one-year, $2.1 million contract.

On March 20, 2026, Cochrane re-signed with the Chiefs on a one-year, $1.415 million contract.

== NFL career statistics ==
Legend
	Won the Super Bowl
**Bold**	Career high

=== Regular season ===
Year	Team	Games		Tackles					Interceptions						Fumbles				
Year	Team	GP	GS	Cmb	Solo	Ast	Sck	TFL	Int	Yds	Avg	Lng	TD	PD	FF	Fmb	FR	Yds	TD
2022	KC	15	0	9	5	4	0.0	0	0	0	0.0	0	0	0	0	0	0	0	0
2023	KC	17	1	**28**	**21**	7	0.0	**2**	0	0	0.0	0	0	**1**	0	0	0	0	0
2024	KC	15	0	5	3	2	0.0	0	0	0	0.0	0	0	0	0	0	0	0	0
2025	KC	17	1	20	7	**13**	0.0	0	**1**	0	0.0	0	0	**1**	0	0	**1**	0	0
Career		64	2	62	36	26	0.0	2	1	0	0.0	0	0	2	0	0	1	0	0

=== Postseason ===
Year	Team	Games		Tackles					Interceptions						Fumbles				
Year	Team	GP	GS	Cmb	Solo	Ast	Sck	TFL	Int	Yds	Avg	Lng	TD	PD	FF	Fmb	FR	Yds	TD
2022	KC	3	0	**1**	0	**1**	0.0	0	0	0	0.0	0	0	0	0	0	0	0	0
2023	KC	4	0	0	0	0	0.0	0	0	0	0.0	0	0	0	0	0	0	0	0
Career		7	0	1	0	1	0.0	0	0	0	0.0	0	0	0	0	0	0	0	0

== Personal life ==
Cochrane was teammates at Mount Vernon High School with current Tampa Bay Buccaneers tackle Tristan Wirfs.
