= T. J. Bollers =

American football player (born 2002)

No. 96 – Jacksonville Jaguars
- Position: Defensive tackle
- Roster status: Practice squad

Personal information
- Born: November 19, 2002 (age 23); Tiffin, Iowa, U.S.
- Listed height: 6 ft 2 in (1.88 m)
- Listed weight: 305 lb (138 kg)

Career information
- High school: Clear Creek Amana (Tiffin, Iowa)
- College: Wisconsin (2021–2023); California (2024–2025)
- NFL draft: 2026: undrafted

Career history
- Jacksonville Jaguars (2026–present)*
- * Offseason or practice squad member only
- Stats at Pro Football Reference

T. J. Bollers (born November 19, 2002) is an American football defensive tackle for the Jacksonville Jaguars of the National Football League (NFL). He played college football for the California Golden Bears and Wisconsin Badgers.

== Early life ==
Bollers attended Clear Creek Amana High School in Tiffin, Iowa. He was a highly-touted recruit, receiving offers from schools such as Alabama, California, Iowa, Iowa State, Nebraska, Penn State, and Wisconsin. Bollers committed to play college football for the Wisconsin Badgers.

== College career ==
=== Wisconsin ===
In three seasons at Wisconsin from 2021 to 2023, Bollers played in 17 total games, notching two tackles. After the 2023 season, he entered the NCAA transfer portal.

=== California ===
Bollers transferred to play for the California Golden Bears. In 2024, he notched 22 tackles. In 2025, Bollers recorded 41 tackles with half a tackle being for a loss, and half a sack in 12 games played.

== Professional career ==
Pre-draft measurables
Height	Weight	Arm length	Hand span	Wingspan	40-yard dash	10-yard split	20-yard split	20-yard shuttle	Three-cone drill	Vertical jump	Broad jump	Bench press
6 ft 2 5/8 in (1.90 m)	294 lb (133 kg)	32 5/8 in (0.83 m)	9 1/2 in (0.24 m)	6 ft 7 7/8 in (2.03 m)	5.11 s	1.73 s	2.95 s	4.70 s	7.76 s	31.5 in (0.80 m)	9 ft 4 in (2.84 m)	18 reps
All values from Pro Day

After not being selected in the 2026 NFL draft, Bollers signed with the Jacksonville Jaguars as an undrafted free agent. On August 30, 2026, Bollers was waived by Jacksonville as a part of final roster cuts; he was re-signed to the team's practice squad the next day.

== Personal life ==
Bollers is the son of former Iowa Hawkeyes football and NFL running back Trevor Bollers, who signed with the Jacksonville Jaguars as an undrafted free agent and later played for the Jacksonville Tomcats of AF2.
