= Marion Independent School District (Iowa) =

School district in Iowa

Coordinates: 42.022988°N 91.592629°W

Location
- Marion, Iowa Linn County United States
- Coordinates: 42.022988, -91.592629

District information
- Type: Local school district
- Motto: Own Your Future
- Grades: K-12
- Superintendent: Janelle Brouwer
- Schools: 6
- Budget: $41,033,000 (2020-21)
- NCES District ID: 1918690

Students and staff
- Students: 2,229 (2022-23)
- Teachers: 174.38 FTE
- Staff: 171.09 FTE
- Student–teacher ratio: 12.78
- Athletic conference: WaMaC Conference
- District mascot: Wolves
- Colors: Red and Gold

Other information
- Website: www.marion-isd.org

Marion Independent School District is a public school district in Marion, Iowa. It consists of a high school, a middle school, an intermediate school and two elementary schools, along with the transportation building.

In addition to Marion, it serves a small portion of Cedar Rapids.

Janelle Brouwer was promoted to superintendent in 2019, after serving in the district since 2016.

== Schools ==
- Marion High School
- Vernon Middle School
- Francis Marion Intermediate School
- Longfellow Elementary School
- Parkview Elementary School
- Starry Elementary School (former)

=== Support facilities ===
- Administration Building
- Transportation Building

It also has the Marion Home School Assistance Program (MHSAP).

== Marion High School ==
In 1991 there was a proposal to move other grades to Marion High so it would have more than grades 9-12. Larry Twachtmann, the principal, supported adding 8th graders, numbering 95 that year so they could access more high level classes, but believed adding those in grade 7, having the same enrollment number, would cause the school to have too many students.

=== Athletics ===
The Wolves compete in the WaMaC Conference in the following sports:

- Baseball
  - Class 3A State Champions (2021)
- Basketball (boys and girls)
- Bowling
- Cross Country (boys and girls)
  - Boys' - 10-time State Champions (1945, 1946, 1948, 1949, 1950, 1951, 1952, 1953, 1954, 1958)
  - Girls' Class 3A State Champions - 2004
- Football
  - Class 3A State Champions - 1980
- Golf (boys and girls)
  - Boys' Class 3A State Champions - 1991
- Soccer (boys and girls)
- Softball
- Swimming (boys and girls)
- Tennis (boys and girls)
- Track and Field (boys and girls)
  - Boys’ Class 3A State Champions (2017,2018)
- Volleyball
  - Class 3A State Champions - 2008
- Wrestling

=== Mascot Change ===
On February 22, 2021, the school board serving the Marion School District voted to remove the past mascot of an "Indian" and begin transitioning to a new one. Before the vote was taken the School District reached out to Native American tribes within the state to garner opinions on whether or not to keep the current mascot of an "Indian." After much discussion, it was made obvious that the mascot wasn't acceptable and the school couldn't move forward into the future without a rebrand. The school than turned towards the student body to make a decision on what the new mascot should be. After nearly 3,000 votes were cast, the new mascot the "Mavericks" was chosen by nearly half of the participants. Other potential mascot names of "Red Storm" and "Red Wolves" were options as well within the survey.

== Notable alumni ==
- Cael Hodges, Baseball outfielder for Iowa Central Community College
