= Robert Bauer (artist) =

American painter (born 1942)

Robert Bauer (born 1942) is an American painter who creates pictures of people, landscapes, backyards, and gardens. Bauer's paintings of backyards and gardens gained him much recognition and his art has been shown in multiple exhibitions.

== Personal life ==
Bauer was born in Iowa in 1942 and spent his childhood on a farm near Williamsburg, Iowa, United States. Despite enjoying drawing as a child and attending art classes in high school, Bauer was not aware until years later that he could make a living from painting. He became a Marine after graduating from high school and drew pictures when he was not on duty. Bauer visited art museums and read about the history of art in his spare time. In 1965, Bauer enrolled at the Pennsylvania Academy of Fine Arts to work on art that involved casts and live studio models. Bauer and his wife Barbara have two children.

== Career ==
Shortly after Bauer finished his art training in 1967, Kenmore Galleries in Philadelphia placed his art in a show titled Four Young Realists. He moved to Iowa in the same year to paint, with most of his art throughout the late 1960s and the early 1970s being paintings of figures that were a mixture of twentieth-century avant-garde funk and seventeenth-century Dutch realism. In 1972, Bauer completed four paintings with three of them being sold to the Davenport Municipal Art Gallery, a bank, and a Maryland museum. He completed 35 to 40 paintings in 1973. Bauer went to schools to show his painting process and answer questions in the 1970s. After that period, Bauer's paintings depicted people as models in natural settings and landscapes. He began to paint backyards and gardens in 1980 and those paintings have given Bauer much of his recognition. He works with acrylic paint and watercolor painting.

=== Exhibitions ===
In 1974, his painting "Iowa County" won a show prize at the Davenport Municipal Art Gallery in Davenport, Iowa. His work has been shown in more than 50 exhibits including Allan Stone Gallery in New York City, the Thomas Segal Gallery in Boston, the Olson-Larsen Galleries in Des Moines, Iowa, the Cedar Rapids Museum of Art in Cedar Rapids, Iowa, the San Francisco Museum of Modern Art, Forum Gallery in New York City, among others. Bauer received two grants from the Massachusetts Cultural Council and two grants from the Pollock-Krasner Foundation. He was a Smithsonian National Portrait Gallery’s Outwin Boochever Portrait Competition finalist in 2006.
