= Holden Foundation Seeds =

Holden Foundation Seeds is an American company that specializes in the research, development, and production of patented foundation seed corn for agriculture. Foundation corn is the parent seed from which hybrids are made.

Established in 1937, in Williamsburg, Iowa by Roland Holden, Holden was the largest independent producer of foundation seed in America before being acquired by Monsanto Company in 1997. Monsanto was subsequently acquired by Bayer in 2018, and Holden is now part of Bayer Crop Science. Today Holden's activities include the research and development of proprietary inbred lines, management of an extensive testing network, collaborations with technology developers.

Holden's parent lines are used to produce hybrid seed that is planted on an estimated 35-40% of corn acres in the United States. The company's breeding program continues to develop proprietary parent lines that are licensed for use by a majority of seed corn companies in the United States and by many around the world.
