= Amana High School =

School in Iowa, United States

Coordinates: 41.79791°N 91.89711°W

Amana High School was a senior high school in Middle Amana, in the Amana Colonies area of Iowa, United States.

It was created in 1935, when residents voted in favor for a bond to establish a high school in two adjacent structures: a brick school building and an adjacent residential building. A 400-seat auditorium was built in the summer of 1935; this fused the two buildings together. A second floor was also added. The bond had a cost of $16,500 ($378418.69 adjusted for inflation). Its first graduating class finished its education in 1936. The school closed in 1991. Students today are served by Clear Creek–Amana High School.

Baseball was the only competitive athletic program available at Amana High.
