= Mount Vernon Community School District =

School district in Iowa, United States

Coordinates: 41.920257°N 91.427763°W

Location
- Mount Vernon, Iowa Linn, Jones, and Johnson counties United States
- Coordinates: 41.920257, -91.427763

District information
- Type: Local school district
- Grades: K-12
- Superintendent: Mr. Leeman
- Schools: 3
- Budget: $20,196,000 (2020-21)
- NCES District ID: 1920040

Students and staff
- Students: 1402 (2022-23)
- Teachers: 95.24 FTE
- Staff: 93.67 FTE
- Student–teacher ratio: 14.72
- Athletic conference: WaMaC Conference
- District mascot: Mustangs
- Colors: Maroon and White

Other information
- Website: mvcsd.org

Mount Vernon Community School District is a public school district headquartered in Mount Vernon, Iowa. The district is mostly in Linn County, with a small areas in Jones and Johnson counties. The district serves the city of Mount Vernon and surrounding areas to the west, plus an additional rural area northeast of Mount Vernon.

Greg Batenhorst was hired as superintendent in 2017.

== Schools ==
The district operate three schools, all in Mount Vernon:

- Washington Elementary School
- Mount Vernon Middle School
- Mount Vernon High School

== Mount Vernon High School ==
The current high school building was built in 2006 with the addition of a Performing Arts Center in 2020 and Activities Complex in 2023.

=== Athletics ===
The Mustangs compete in the WaMaC Conference in the following sports:

- Baseball
  - Class 2A State Champions - 1997
- Softball
  - Class 3A State Champions 2022
- Basketball (boys and girls)
  - Boys' 2-time State Champions - 1973, 2012
  - Girls' Class 2A State Champions - 2010
- Cross Country (boys and girls)
  - Boys' Class 3A State Champions (as Mt. Vernon-Lisbon) - 2005
  - Girls' Class 3A State Champions (as Mt. Vernon-Lisbon) - 2008
- Football
  - 3-time Class 2A State Champions - 1974, 1993, 1994
- Golf (boys and girls)
- Soccer (boys and girls)
- Swimming (boys and girls) (Through contract with Washington High School (Cedar Rapids, Iowa))
- Tennis (girls)
- Track and Field (boys and girls)
  - Boys' Class 2A State Champions - 2004
  - Girls' 3-time State Champions - 1985, 2009, 2010
- Volleyball
  - 5-time State Champions - 1984, 2009, 2010, 2019, 2024
- Wrestling (boys and girls)

== Notable alumni ==
- Matt Kroul, National Football League player
- Tristan Wirfs, National Football League player
- Jack Cochrane (American football), National Football League player
- Jefferson White, Actor
- Dan Bern, Musician

== See also ==
- List of school districts in Iowa
- List of high schools in Iowa
