= Kinze Manufacturing, Inc. =

American manufacturer of agricultural equipment

Kinze Manufacturing
- Logo used since 2020
- Company type: Private
- Industry: Agriculture
- Founded: 1965; 61 years ago Ladora, Iowa, U.S.
- Headquarters: Williamsburg, Iowa
- Area served: United States; Central Europe; Eastern Europe
- Key people: Jon Kinzenbaw (Founder, CEO, Chairman); Susanne Kinzenbaw Veatch (President)
- Products: Row crop planter; Grain carts; Tillage equipment
- Website: www.kinze.com

Kinze Manufacturing, Inc. is an American company that produces agricultural equipment.

Kinze Welding first opened in 1965 by Jon Kinzenbaw as a small welding and repair shop in Ladora, Iowa. Initially starting by doing repairs for local farmers, it grew quickly by taking on custom fabrication projects such as wagons, end loaders, and fertilizer spreaders. In 1968, Jon seized an opportunity to re-power John Deere 5020s with 300+ horsepower Detroit Diesel engines, which provided recognition for his company.

In 1976, Kinze Manufacturing, Inc. moved to Williamsburg, Iowa where its factory facilities grew to keep pace with the production of agricultural equipment. Today, Kinze is a leading manufacturer of row crop planters, grain carts, and high-speed disks.

Kinze opened a production facility in Vilnius, Lithuania in 2013 to meet the growing demand for their products in Central and Eastern Europe. This enabled Kinze to provide better and faster service to European customers and freed up production space at the Williamsburg, Iowa plant for North American production.

== Operations in Europe ==
On June 12, 2013, Kinze opened a production plant in Lithuania. It is the company's first manufacturing plant outside of the United States. The factory should help Kinze Manufacturing meet the growing demand for its production in Central and Eastern Europe.

== Company Timeline ==
1965: Jon Kinzenbaw, company founder, opens a small welding and repair shop, Kinze Welding, in Ladora, Iowa.

1967: Four-wheel auger unloading wagons are built that enable large loads of grain to be moved in difficult field conditions.

1968: Jon re-powers John Deere 5020s and builds custom 3-wheel flotation fertilizer applicators.

1969: First mass-produced product is the anhydrous ammonia applicator – one of the first to use rolling coulters.

1971: Builds the first two-wheeled, 400-bushel grain cart equipped with large-diameter augers for fast unloading, and high-flotation tires for mobility in soft conditions. Invents and patents the adjustable-width plow; licensed it to DMI of Goodfield, Illinois to build and market.

1974: Builds a 600+ horsepower tractor, Big Blue, a 12-bottom adjustable-width plow, and reveals at the 1974 farm progress show.

1975: Develops and introduces a 24-row rear-folding planter that enabled easy field-to-field transport of large-width planters.

1976: Kinze Manufacturing, Inc. moves to Williamsburg, Iowa, building a new manufacturing facility along Interstate 80.

1978: Introduces planters with split rows to enable planting narrow rows.

1980: Kinze-built row units unveiled at National Farm Machinery Show.

1981: Introduction of smaller double-framed planters that enabled easier spacing of row units.

1983: Push row units were introduced that allowed split row units to be staggered for improved trash flow.

1985: Developed and introduced raise and pivot fold planters for narrow and fast transport.

1988: Grain carts are equipped with SOF-TRAKS for improved flotation in soft conditions. Kinze Power Products, Inc. was formed to repower John Deere FWD tractors.

1990: Invents and patents the brush meter for precise singulation and planting of soybeans. 40-Series grain carts introduced.

1991: Grain carts equipped with conveyor unloading belts are launched for handling seed crops.

1992: Kinze expands its product offering with the introduction of conservation cultivators.

1994: Front fold 2700 planter debuts. Allowed easy spacing of row units along the length of the bar.

1995: Kinze introduces 12- and 16-row stack folding mounted planters that keep row units upright.

1999: The 3000-series planter models and Evolution Series row units are launched.

2000: To ensure quality is maintained, Kinze begins manufacturing its own hydraulic cylinders.

2001: First planter bulk fill system debuts. 1050 Harvest Commander Grain Cart is introduced.

2003: The iconic rotating planter yard art display is unveiled on Kinze's front yard.

2004: The introduction of the giant 36-row, 30" row spaced planter enabled farmers to plant up to 1000 acres a day.

2005: Kinze enters the vacuum meter market with the debut of the EdgeVac vacuum meter.

2007: Kinze collaborates with Ag Leader and introduces the Kinze Vision Planter Control System.

2008: New air-seed delivery bulk fill system is launched, equipped with a hydraulic weight transfer system to transfer weight from the center to the outside of the planter.

2011: Stylized corner dual-auger grain carts are introduced as models 900, 1100, 1300, and 1500.

2011: Developed and patented successfully operating autonomous planter and grain cart concepts.

2013: The world's first electric drive planter, the front fold model 4900, is introduced by Kinze. Also released are the 4000-Series row unit and True Rate meter.

2014: Kinze pioneers multi-hybrid planting with the debut of the 4900 Multi-Hybrid planter.

2015: The 851 and 1051 single auger grain carts join Kinze's family of corner dual auger grain carts.

2018: Kinze begins manufacturing and marketing Mach Till high-speed disks – ranging in size from 20 to 41 feet.

2019: The Blue Vantage planter display and Blue Drive electric is introduced.

2021: Kinze introduced the True Speed high speed meter that enables farmers to plant at speeds from 3 to 12 mph.

== Kinze's Product Line ==
=== Row Planters ===
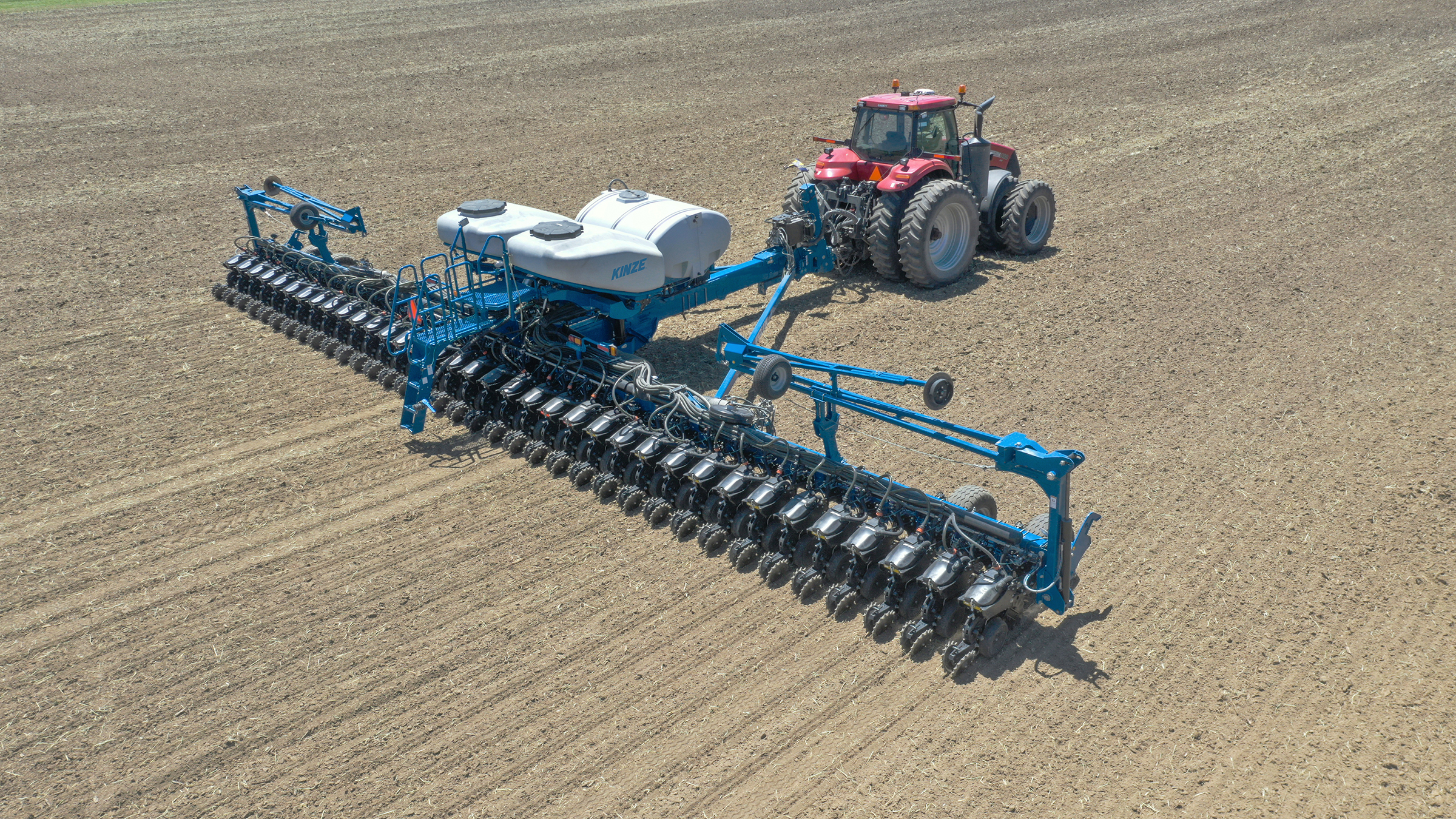
Row crop planters from 4 to 36 rows in size

=== Grain Carts ===
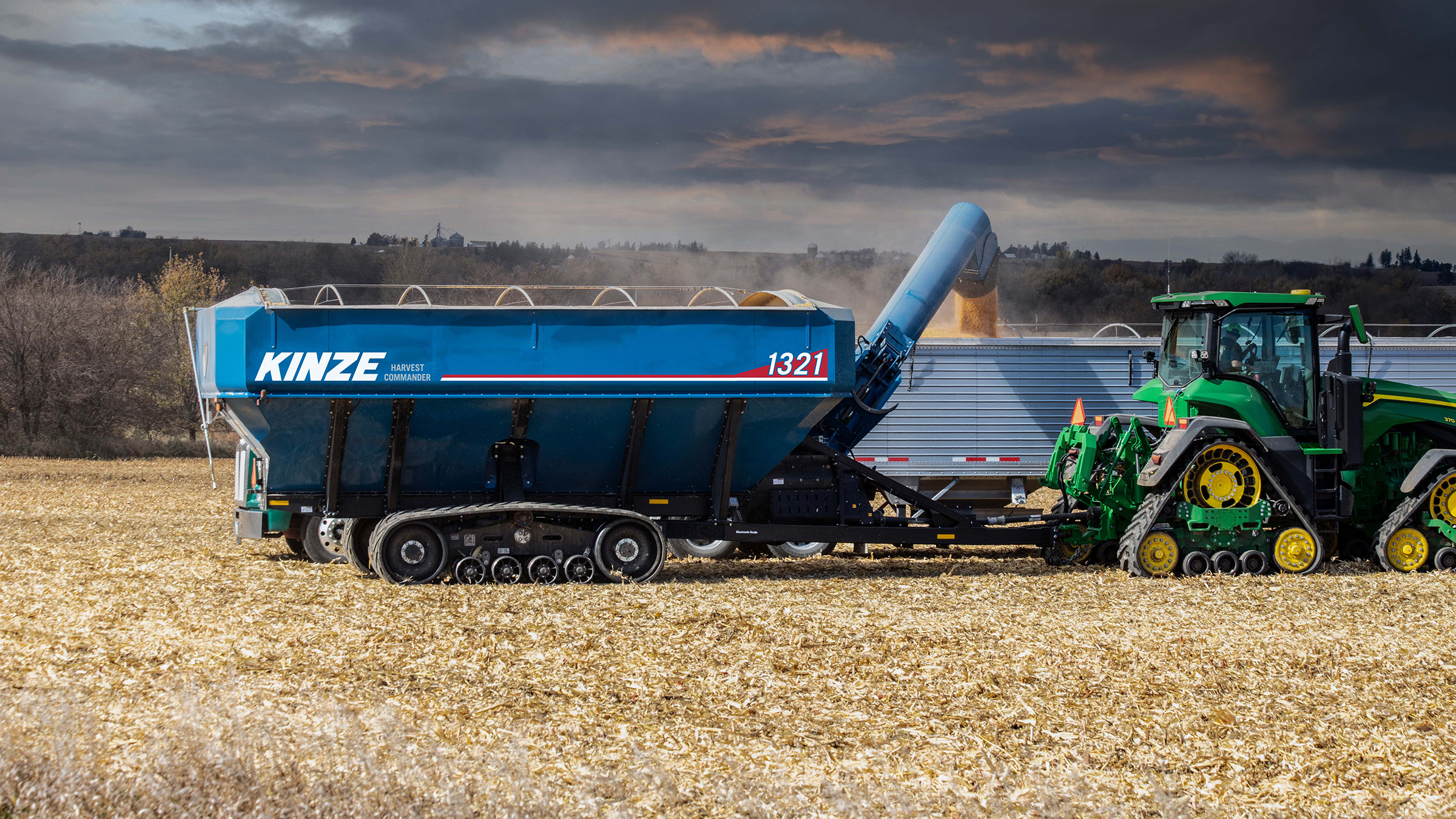
Grain carts from 1,050- to 1,700-bushel capacities

=== Tillage ===
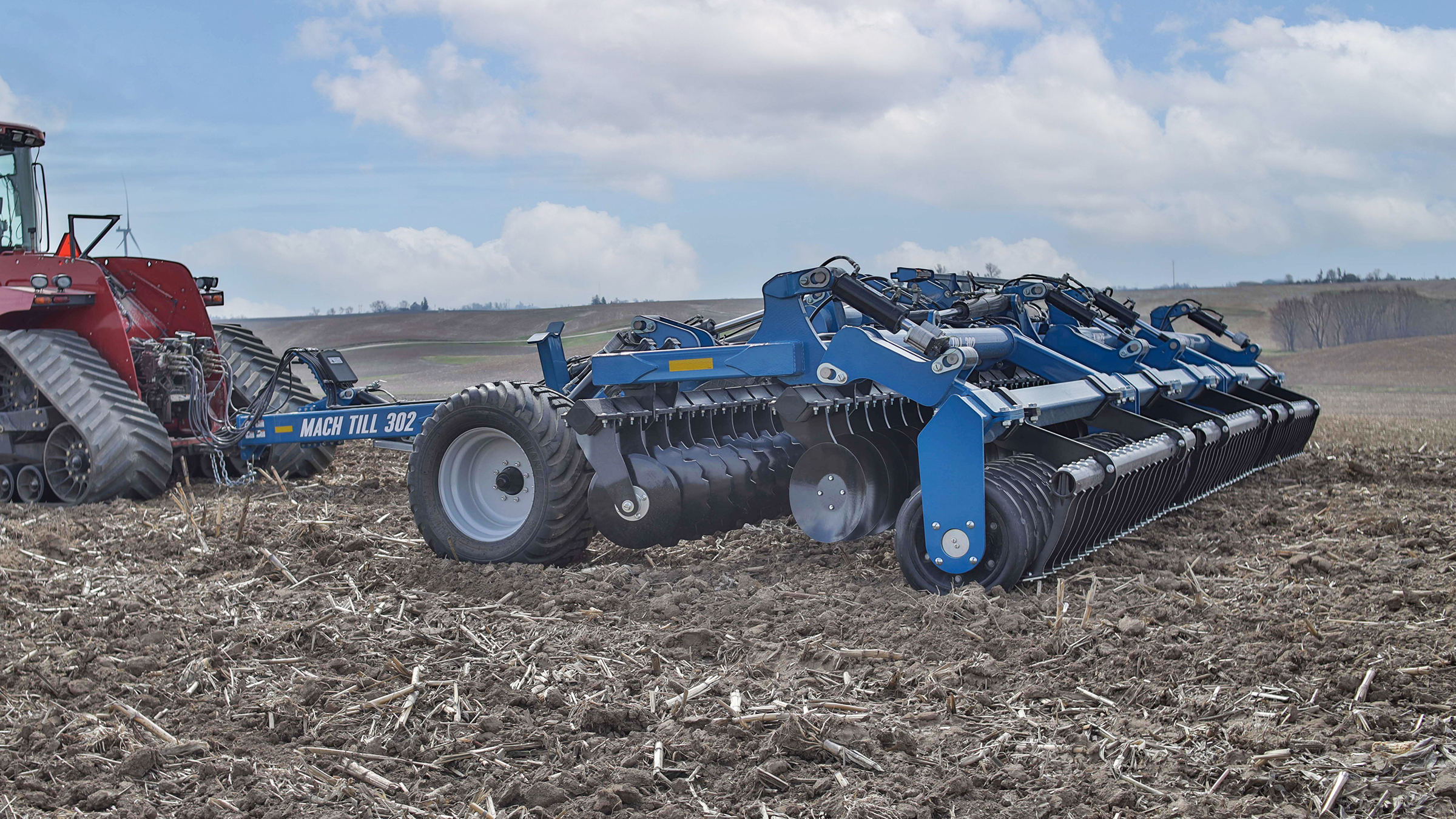
High-speed disks from 20 to 41 feet in width
