= Clear Creek Amana Community School District =

Public school district in Tiffin, Iowa, United States

Coordinates: 41.720317°N 91.790911°W

Location
- Oxford, Iowa Johnson and Iowa counties United States
- Coordinates: 41.720317, -91.790911

District information
- Grades: PK–12
- Established: 1995
- Superintendent: Aaron Davidson
- Schools: 8
- Budget: $47,247,000 (2020-21)
- NCES District ID: 1907590

Students and staff
- Students: 3,061 (2022-23)
- Teachers: 214.49 FTE
- Staff: 254.49 FTE
- Student–teacher ratio: 14.27
- Athletic conference: WaMaC
- District mascot: Clippers
- Colors: Royal blue and White

Other information
- Website: www.ccaschools.org

The Clear Creek Amana Community School District, sometimes abbreviated CCA, is a rural public school district spanning Johnson and Iowa counties in Iowa. With its administrative offices in Oxford, the district spans areas of eastern Iowa and western Johnson counties, encompassing the communities of Oxford, Amana, North Liberty and Tiffin.

The district has six main school facilities, located in various towns in the district. The district is governed by a seven-member board of directors, which meets monthly. The school district is accredited by the North Central Association of Colleges and Schools and the Iowa Department of Education.

== History ==
The Clear Creek Amana School District formed on July 1, 1995, the result of the merger of the Amana and Clear Creek school districts. The former Clear Creek School District formed in 1964, the result of the merger of several school districts in western Johnson County, serving the towns of Oxford, Tiffin and the surrounding rural areas. Amana had been its own school district starting in 1935, three years after The Great Change. Each district had its own high school, until the two districts entered into a whole-grade sharing agreement in 1990, with high school students from Amana attending Clear Creek and middle school students from Clear Creek attending Amana. The whole grade sharing agreement remained until the districts merged.

== Facilities ==
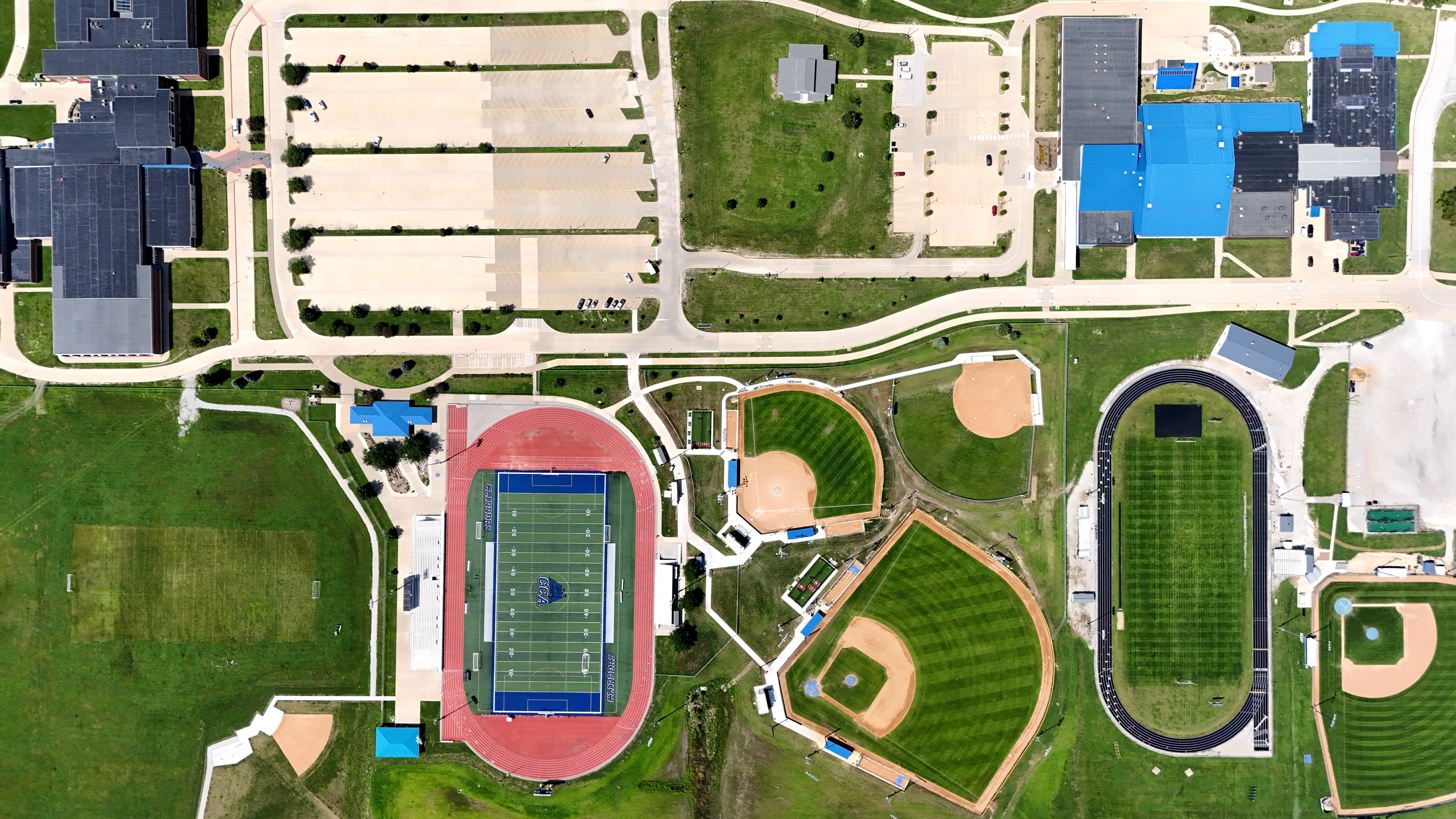
Tiffin school campus with the high school (upper left), middle school (upper right) and athletic facilities.

The current high school opened in 2009, with the former high school building converted into a middle school housing sixth- through eighth-grade students; both facilities are located in Tiffin. The former high school, which was built and opened in the late 1960s, had served as Clear Creek High School prior to 1990, and was a junior-senior high school facility.

The original Clear Creek High School was located in Oxford from 1964—the year the district was formed—through 1968; it later became the elementary school and today retains the name Clear Creek Elementary.

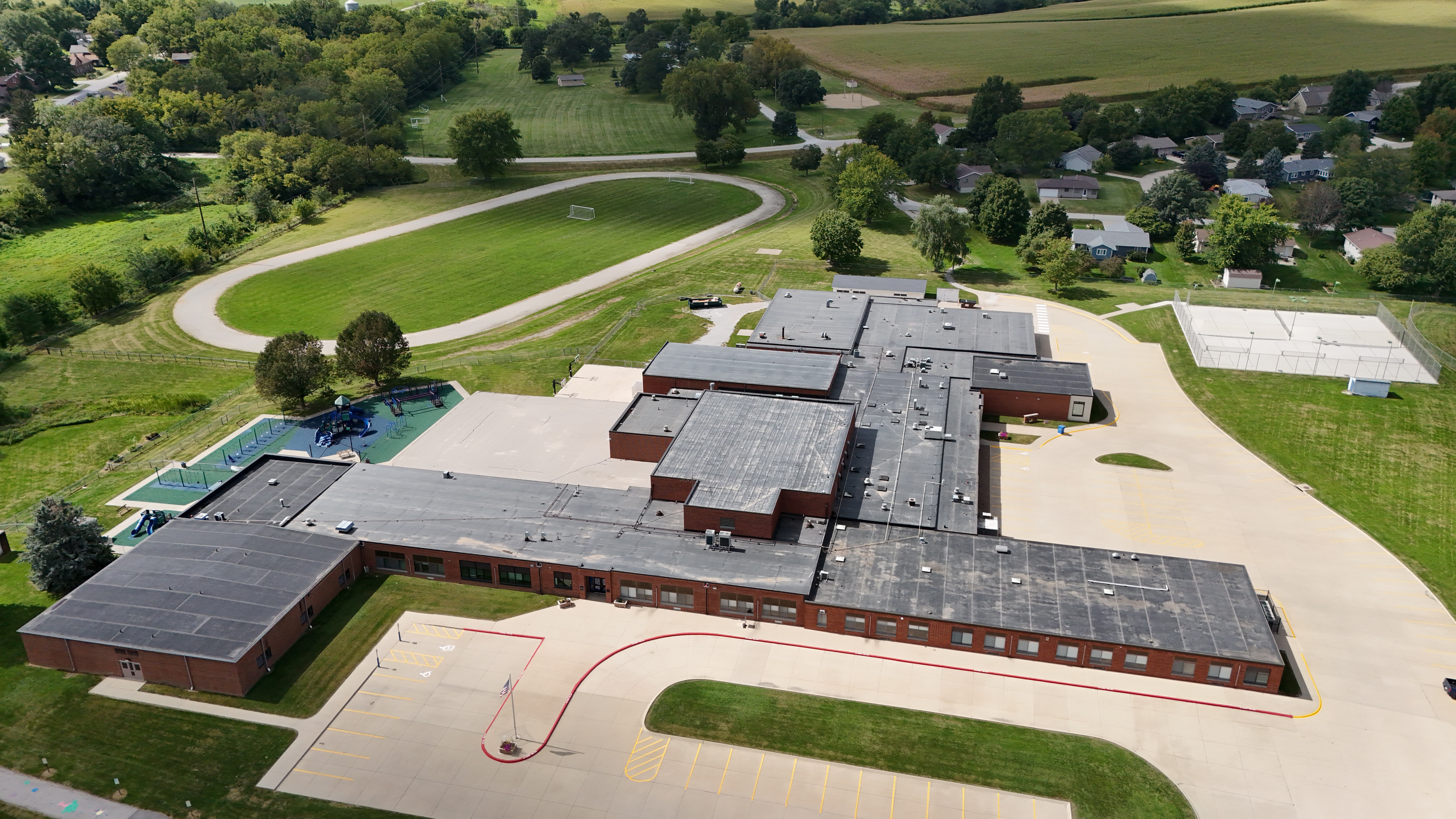
Amana Elementary School in Middle Amana

Amana Elementary was opened in 1969, and at one time was a K–12 facility (when Amana had its own junior-senior high school); specifically, the facility is located in Middle Amana. Prior to 1969, the school operated in an old brick building in Amana.

North Bend Elementary, located in North Liberty and serving northeast areas of the district, opened its doors in 2008, with an addition completed in 2013. With further growth expected in the school district, voters in February 2014 passed a $48 million bond referendum to fund construction of a new elementary school in Tiffin, additions to the middle and high school buildings and improvements to Amana and Clear Creek elementaries. The new elementary school, to be called Tiffin Elementary, was scheduled to be completed in time for the 2015–16 school year.

Both the new high school and North Bend Elementary were the result of population growth, primarily in the eastern and northeastern portions of the school district.

=== List of schools ===
Secondary

- Clear Creek Amana High School, Tiffin.
- Clear Creek Amana Middle School, Tiffin.
  - Clear Creek Amana Middle School was previously in Middle Amana.

Elementary

- Oak Hill Elementary, Tiffin (grades 4–5) - Opened to take excess students from North Bend and Tiffin schools.
- Amana Elementary, Middle Amana census-designated place.
- Clear Creek Elementary, Oxford.
- East Ridge Elementary, Coralville.
- North Bend Elementary, North Liberty.
- Tiffin Elementary, Tiffin.
  - It opened in fall 2015. The firm RSP and Associates projected that the student population of Tiffin Elementary would increase by 190 students from 2016 to 2020–2021, making it over capacity by 2019.
- 2022 Bond Project, Coralville
  - In March 2022, voters in the Clear Creek Amana Community School District (CCA) passed a $65million bond referendum of which included build, furnish, and equip a new elementary school, including related site improvements; to build, furnish, and equip new playground spaces and to remodel, repair, and improve existing playground spaces at the District’s elementary facilities; to build, furnish, and equip additions (improvements) to the District’s middle and high school facilities, including fine arts space at the Middle School and the High School; career and technical vocational space at the high school; replace and improve the middle school roof; and related site improvements at the middle school and the high school? The groundbreaking for the new elementary building will be June 7th at 4:00 PM. The new elementary will be the largest elementary in the CCA School District with a student capacity of 600. The building will be located on the very west side of Coralville (East side of the CCA School District) in a new development area South of Oakdale Blvd near Jones Blvd.

== Enrollment ==
Enrollment has increased significantly since 2000, particularly since 2011.

View source data.

== Notable alumni ==
- Ashton Kutcher, class of 1996, actor and producer.

== See also ==
- List of school districts in Iowa
