= Austin Blythe =

American football player (born 1992)

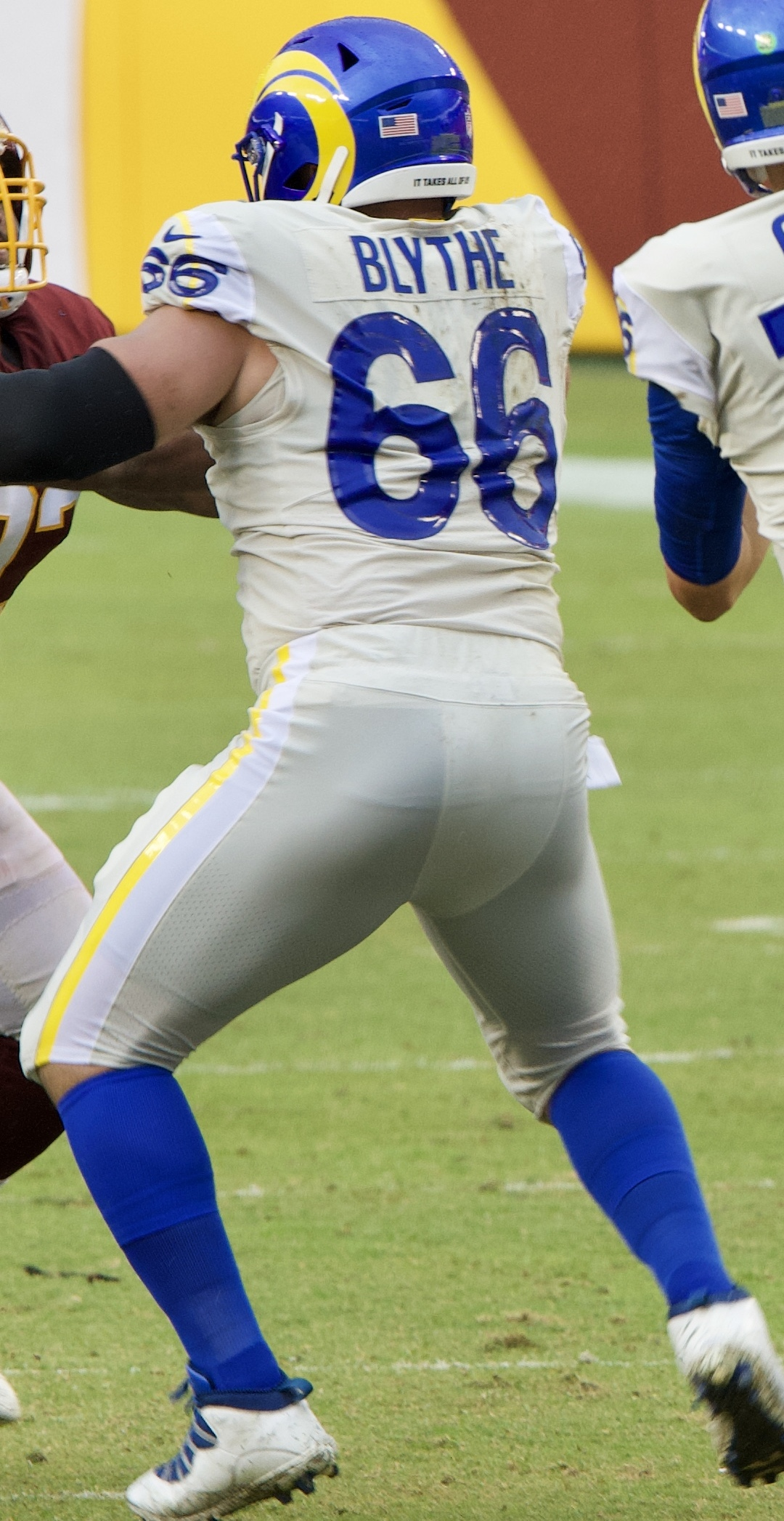
- Blythe with the Los Angeles Rams in 2020

No. 66, 63
- Position: Center

Personal information
- Born: June 16, 1992 (age 34); Kansas City, Missouri, U.S.
- Listed height: 6 ft 2 in (1.88 m)
- Listed weight: 298 lb (135 kg)

Career information
- High school: Williamsburg (Williamsburg, Iowa)
- College: Iowa
- NFL draft: 2016: 7th round, 248th overall pick

Career history
- Indianapolis Colts (2016); Los Angeles Rams (2017–2020); Kansas City Chiefs (2021); Seattle Seahawks (2022)

Awards and highlights
- Built Ford Tough Offensive Line of the Year (2018); Second-team All-Big Ten (2015)

Career NFL statistics
- Games played: 75
- Games started: 49
- Stats at Pro Football Reference

Austin Blythe (born June 16, 1992) is an American former professional football player who was a center for seven seasons in the National Football League (NFL). He played college football for the Iowa Hawkeyes, and was selected by the Indianapolis Colts in the seventh round of the 2016 NFL draft. He also played for the Los Angeles Rams, Kansas City Chiefs, and Seattle Seahawks.

== College career ==
Blythe was a four-year starter at the University of Iowa, appearing in 52 games. As a senior, he aided the Hawkeyes to a 12–0 start, earning a spot in the Big Ten Championship and the 2016 Rose Bowl. He was a finalist for the Rimington Award, which is given annually to the nation's top center, in his senior season.

== Professional career ==
Pre-draft measurables
Height	Weight	Arm length	Hand span	40-yard dash	10-yard split	20-yard split	20-yard shuttle	Three-cone drill	Vertical jump	Broad jump	Bench press
6 ft 2 1/8 in (1.88 m)	291 lb (132 kg)	30 1/4 in (0.77 m)	9 3/8 in (0.24 m)	5.36 s	1.80 s	3.04 s	**4.53** s	7.52 s	27.5 in (0.70 m)	8 ft 3 in (2.51 m)	29 reps
**Bold** denotes combine top performer All values from NFL Combine

=== Indianapolis Colts ===
Blythe was drafted in the seventh round (248th overall) of the 2016 NFL draft by the Indianapolis Colts. He signed his rookie contract with the Colts on May 5, 2016. As a rookie in 2016, he served as a backup center behind fellow rookie Ryan Kelly. In the 2016 season, Blythe played in eight games with one start.

On May 15, 2017, Blythe was waived by the Colts.

=== Los Angeles Rams ===
On May 16, 2017, Blythe was claimed off waivers by the Los Angeles Rams. He played in all 16 games in 2017 and earned his first start of the season in Week 17 at left guard.

Blythe entered the 2018 season as the starting right guard after incumbent starter Jamon Brown was suspended the first two games of the year. Upon Brown's return, Blythe maintained his starting role.

On March 26, 2020, Blythe re-signed with the Rams.

=== Kansas City Chiefs ===
Blythe signed with the Kansas City Chiefs on April 5, 2021.

=== Seattle Seahawks ===
Blythe signed with the Seattle Seahawks on March 21, 2022.

Blythe played and started 17 games in his one season with the Seahawks. He also started in the wild card round for the Seahawks.

On February 28, 2023, Blythe announced his retirement from the NFL after seven seasons.

== Personal life ==
Blythe is a graduate of Williamsburg (Iowa) High School, where he was a two-time all-state football player at center and a three-time state champion in wrestling. He married Kiley Ritchie, daughter of his high school football coach, in 2015. The two had known each other since elementary school, but did not begin dating until college. In June 2016, he and his wife had a son. In January 2020, he and his wife had their second child, a daughter. In October 2022, the couple welcomed their third child, a daughter, into the world.
