= Clear Creek Amana High School =

Public school in Tiffin, Iowa, United States

Location
- 551 W. Marengo Rd. Tiffin, Iowa 52340; United States; 41.7065°N 91.6745°W

Information
- School type: Public high school
- Founded: 1967
- School district: Clear Creek–Amana Community School District (1995–); Clear Creek Community School District (1990–1995)
- Superintendent: Aaron Davidson
- Principal: Tom Daniel
- Teaching staff: 54.60 (FTE)
- Grades: 9-12
- Enrollment: 800 (2023–2024)
- Student to teacher ratio: 13.81
- Language: English
- Colors: Royal blue and white
- Mascot: Clippers
- Feeder schools: Clear Creek Amana Middle School
- Athletic Conference: WaMaC Conference
- Website: ccahs.ccaschools.org

Clear Creek Amana High School, or CCA High School, is a public senior high school in Tiffin, Iowa, and a part of the Clear Creek–Amana Community School District. It serves the entire district.

Clippers is the school mascot.

The school will receive an addition as part of a bond program.

== History ==
The school was formed after the Clear Creek Community School District and the Amana Community School District entered into a whole grade sharing arrangement, consolidating Clear Creek High School and Amana High School. Its initial enrollment was 210, with 60 being in the 9th grade. 10 total students originated from outside the Clear Creek and Amana districts (from the previous year) and 50 total previously attended Amana High School.

Tom McAreavy served as principal of this school and the predecessor school Clear Creek High from circa 1980 until 1995. Tom McDonald took over the position.

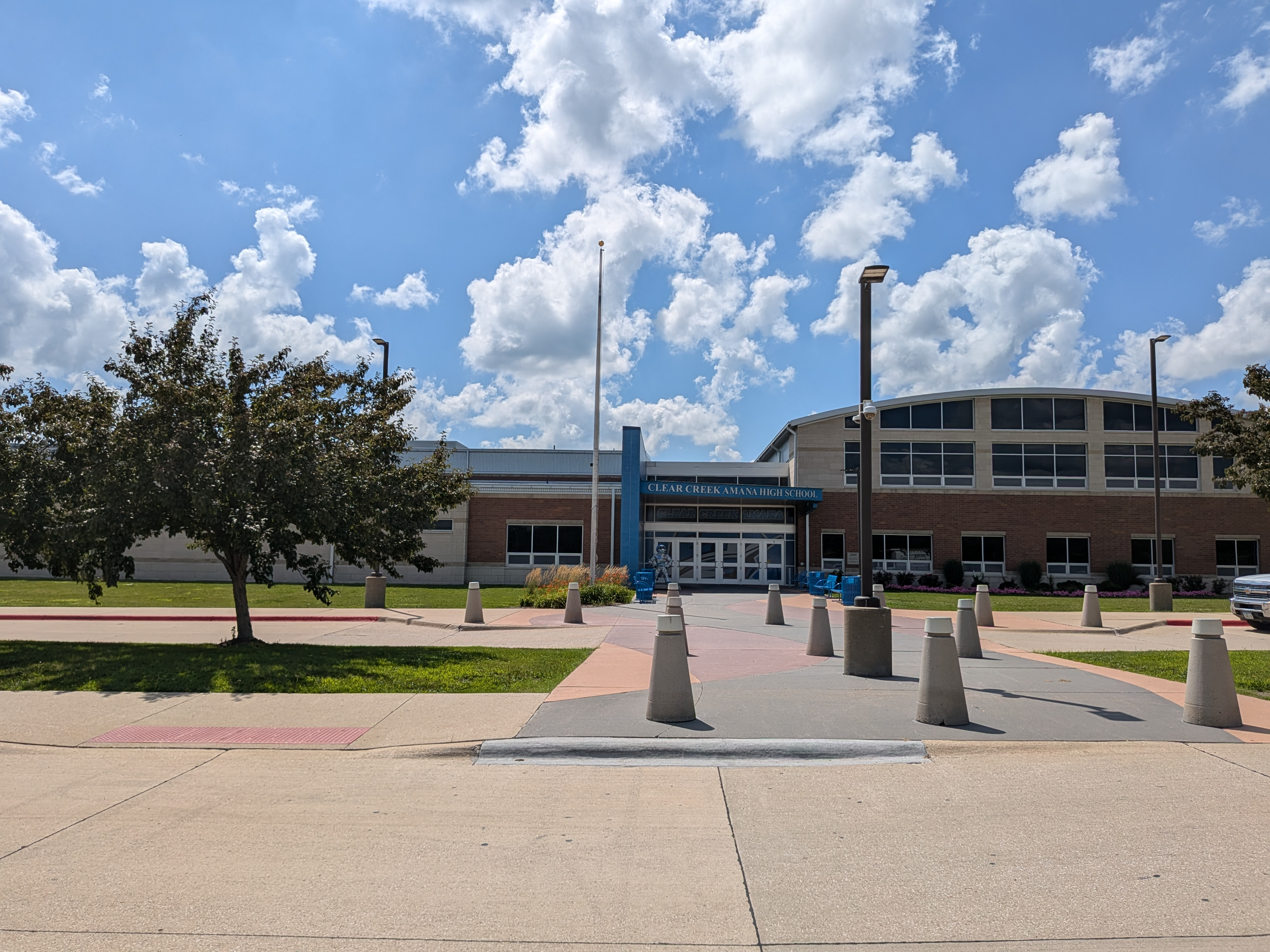
Clear Creek Amana High School in Tiffin

Shive-Hattery, Inc. designed a new facility for 600 students. The current high school building opened in 2009, with the former high school building converted into a middle school housing sixth- through eighth-grade students; both facilities are located in Tiffin. There were 500 students at that time. The former high school, which was built and opened in the late 1960s, had served as Clear Creek High School prior to 1990, and was a junior-senior high school facility. In 2016 the district planned to add an addition to the west wing, with Portzen Construction of Dubuque, Iowa being given a $7.8 million contract.

In 2019 the district leadership decided that the old campus was too small and it needed a new campus by 2027, with the current campus becoming a middle school.

== Operations ==
In 1990 the school had eight periods per day, while the previous Clear Creek High had seven periods. As of 2025, Clear Creek Amana runs on a block schedule, with 4 blocks per day. The school also operates on an ‘A’ day ‘B’ day schedule, meaning the students actually have eight classes that rotate based on the day.

The high school has an advisory period at the end of each day except for Wednesdays.

The school day begins at 8:25 and ends at 3:25.

== Curriculum ==
In 1990 the school had German and Spanish as foreign languages classes available, which were not available at Clear Creek High. These classes are still available as of 2025.

Clear Creek Amana currently offers four AP classes: AP English Language and Composition, AP English Literature and Composition, AP Calculus (AB), and AP US History. As of 2024, CCA pays for every student enrolled in an AP course to take the AP exams. The school also offers to pay for the AP Calculus (BC) exam even though it does not actually offer the class.

Clear Creek Amana also offers many fine arts classes: Concert Band/Marching Band, Lyrica, Cantores, Voce, Musical Theatre, Music Theory I and II, Digital Photography, Glassworks I and II, Drawing I and II, Painting I and II, Ceramics I and II, Graphic Design, Advanced Art, and Printmaking.

Clear Creek Amana currently offers dual enrollment courses with nearby Kirkwood Community College through their regional center in Coralville. This program is only available to juniors and seniors.

== Athletics ==
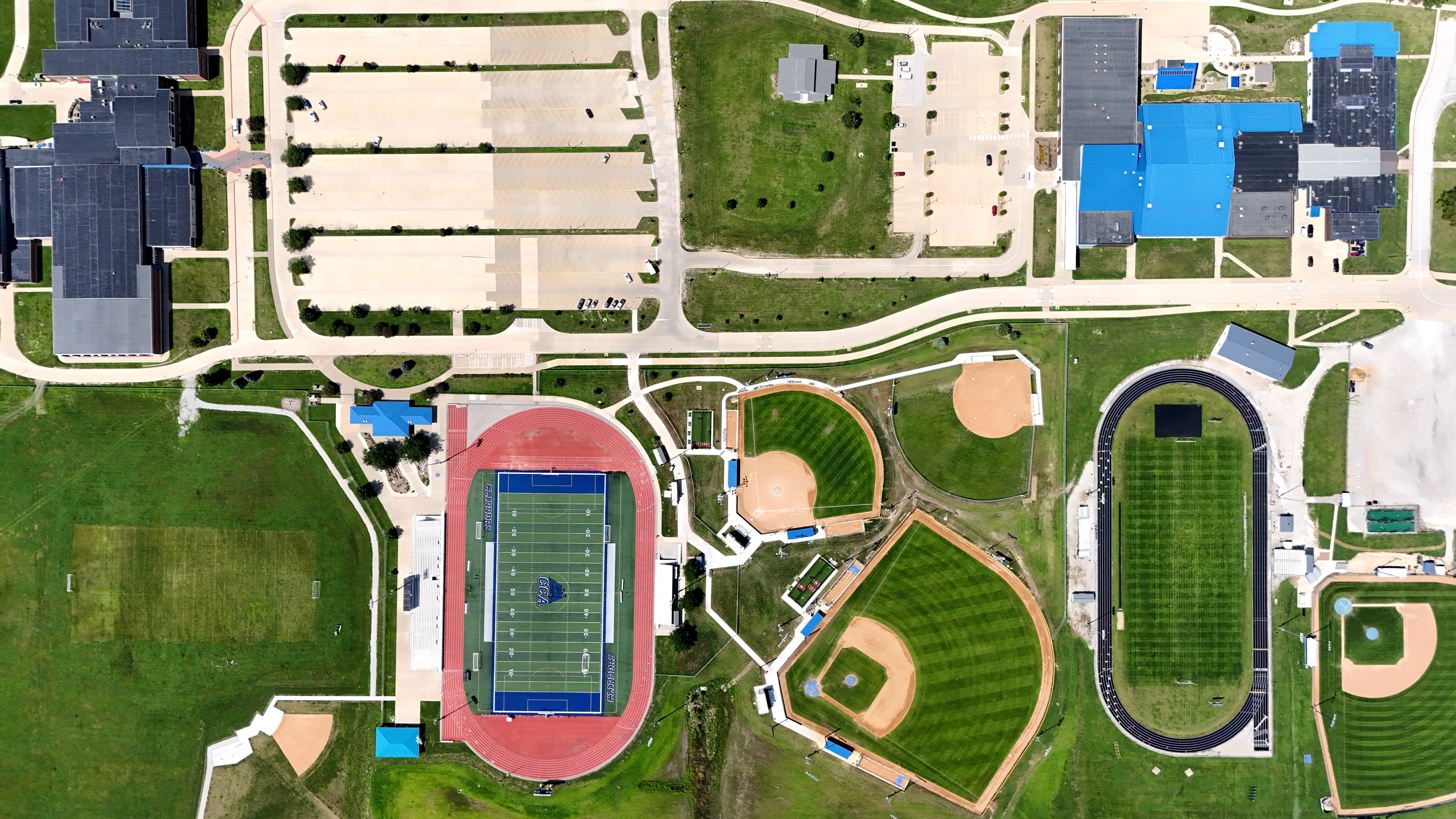
Tiffin school campus with the high school (upper left), middle school (upper right) and athletic facilities.

Athletic teams are known as the Clippers, and a sailor mascot known as Blue is present at football games. No mascot is present at other sporting events. At the Amana Elementary, inside the gym, there is an old indication that the school's mascot was the Rockets. The school song is "Anchors Aweigh" and is played at pep rallies and athletic events, as well as school events. CCA participates in 15 sports in the WaMaC Conference. The school is well known for its softball program, making it to the state softball tournament 34 times, more than any other high school in Iowa, and winning 9 state titles (as of the finish of the 2018 season).

=== State championships ===
- Softball
  - Summer (1973, 1975, 1997, 2002, 2004, 2006, 2009, 2011)
  - Fall (1972, 1973)
- Girls Basketball
  - 2024

== Notable alumni ==
- T.J. Bollers (class of 2021), NFL defensive tackle for the Jacksonville Jaguars
- Ashton Kutcher (class of 1996), actor and producer

== See also ==
- List of high schools in Iowa
