= Williamsburg Community School District (Iowa) =

Public school district in Williamsburg, Iowa, United States

Coordinates: 41.662855°N 92.018800°W

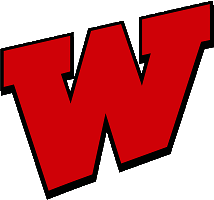

Location
- Williamsburg, Iowa Iowa County United States
- Coordinates: 41.662855, -92.018800

District information
- Type: Local school district
- Grades: K-12
- Established: 1886
- Superintendent: Dr. Chad Garber
- Schools: 2
- Budget: $18,494,000 (2020-21)
- NCES District ID: 1931680

Students and staff
- Students: 1269 (2022-23)
- Teachers: 90.92 FTE
- Staff: 83.54 FTE
- Student–teacher ratio: 13.96
- Athletic conference: WaMaC Conference
- District mascot: Raiders
- Colors: Red and White

Other information
- Website: www.williamsburg.k12.ia.us/home

The Williamsburg Community School District is a rural public school district headquartered in Williamsburg, Iowa.

The district spans areas of central Iowa County, and serves areas surrounding the towns of Williamsburg, Parnell, and Conroy.

The school facilities are in Williamsburg. The sports teams are known as the Raiders, and compete in the WaMaC Conference.

The school district is accredited by the North Central Association of Colleges and Schools and the Iowa Department of Education. The Williamsburg School District was formed in 1886.

== History ==
The Independent School District of Williamsburg was formed by a vote on March 13, 1886. This allowed the district to set its own policies independent of the existing township school district, and a new four-room, two-story schoolhouse was built in 1888 for the district. In April, 1893, the board appointed Professor A.T. Hukill as the first Superintendent of Schools.

Due to growth in the district, a new three-story brick building was constructed in 1908–09. In 1936, a new grade school was constructed, replacing the 1888 building. The building included a gymnasium. The district received a grant through the Works Progress Administration to fund 40% of the cost of the school.

Mr. H.C. Messer was appointed Superintendent in 1943, replacing Mr. McGrew. In 1946, Williamsburg was admitted to the Ka-Wash Athletic Conference, which included North English, Kalona, Wellman, West Chester, Keota, Richland and Brighton.

In 1956, the district merged with York School Township; Troy School Township; Half of Iowa Township; Lincoln District in Hilton Township; Maple Grove, North Pilot, Colton, Pilot Grove, Center, Sugar Hill, all in Pilot Township; and Cherry District in English Township to form the Williamsburg Community School District (first re-organization). A single story addition was added to the grade school in 1956, and new high school (the oldest portion of the present building) was constructed in 1957. In 1957, a second re-organization added Omaha and South Pilot Districts of Pilot Township and a part of Sumner Township voted to become part of the district. In 1959, Williamsburg became part of the South Iowa Cedar League. In 1960, the Hilton School District merged with Williamsburg and the Parnell District closed its high school, but remained independent and sent its high school students to Williamsburg. In 1962, Parnell became part of the district, forming the current boundaries.

In 1963, the old high school was demolished. In 1968, after several previous failed bonds to add to the high school, a $525,000 bond passed to add a swimming pool, enlarged media center, and additional classrooms to the high school.

In 1997, a bond passed to construct a new elementary school — the Mary Welsh Elementary School. When the school opened, the school building in Parnell was closed.

== List of schools ==
- Mary Welsh Elementary School (PK-6)
- Williamsburg Junior-Senior High School (7-12)

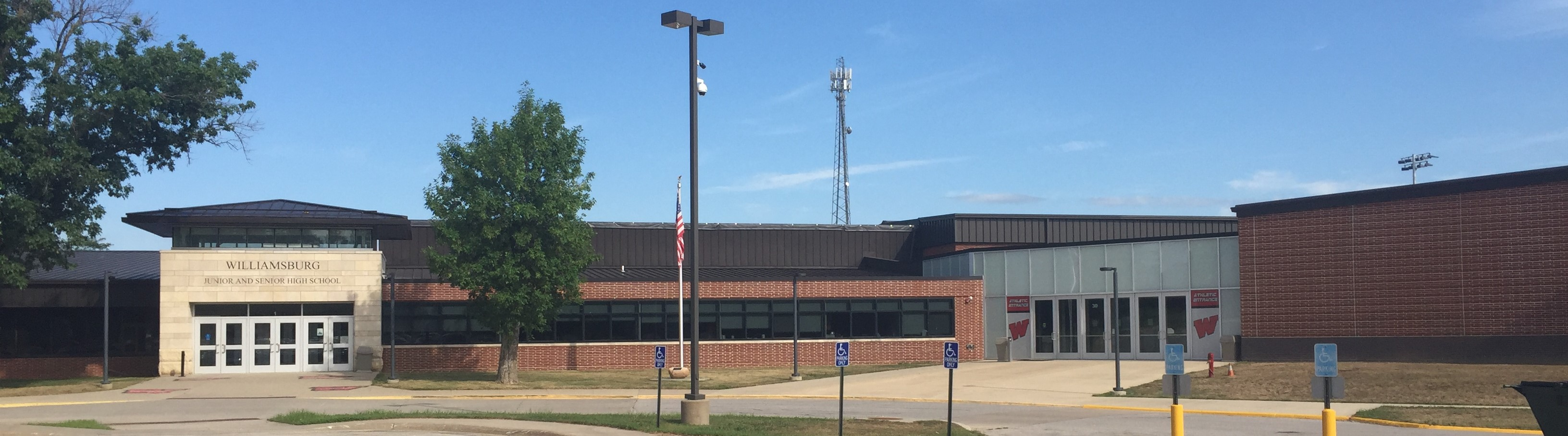
Williamsburg Jr-Sr High School

== Williamsburg High School ==
=== Athletics ===
The Raiders compete in the WaMaC Conference in the following sports:

- Baseball
- Basketball
- Cross Country
  - Boys' - 2-time State Champions (1939, 1991)
- Football
  - 2023 Class 3A Champions
- Golf
  - 1994 Girls' Class 1A State Champions
- Soccer
- Softball
  - 2023, 2024, 2025 Class 3A State Champions
- Swimming
- Tennis
- Track and Field
  - Boys' 2002 & 2023 Class 2A State Champions
- Volleyball
- Wrestling

== Notable alumni ==
- Austin Blythe, offensive lineman for the Iowa Hawkeyes and Kansas City Chiefs
- William Shannahan, third president of St. Ambrose University
- Quentin Stanerson, member of the Iowa House of Representatives
- Kaden Wetjen, wide receiver and return specialist for the Iowa Hawkeyes and Pittsburgh Steelers

== See also ==
- List of school districts in Iowa
- List of high schools in Iowa
