= Tristan Wirfs =

American football player (born 1999)

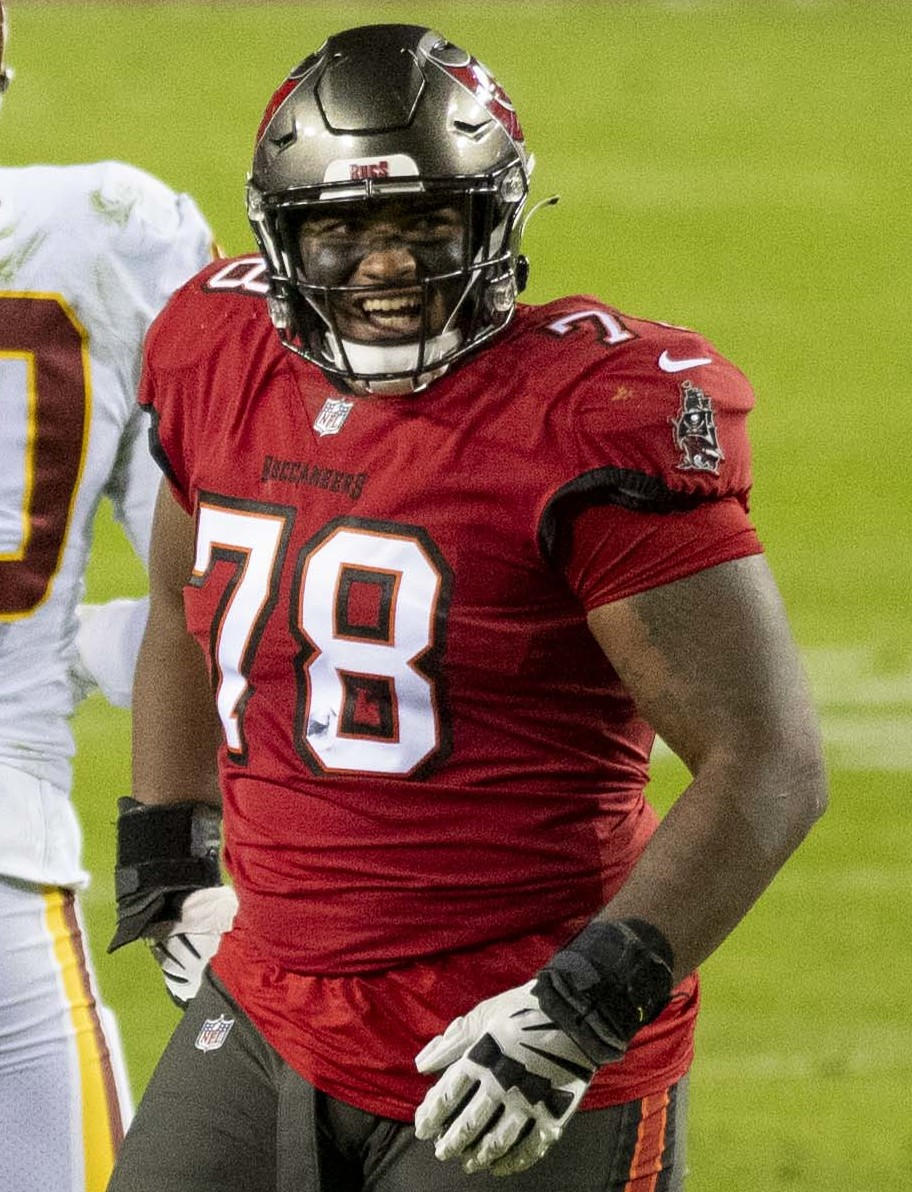
- Wirfs with the Tampa Bay Buccaneers in 2021

No. 78 – Tampa Bay Buccaneers
- Position: Offensive tackle
- Roster status: Active

Personal information
- Born: January 24, 1999 (age 27); Mount Vernon, Iowa, U.S.
- Listed height: 6 ft 5 in (1.96 m)
- Listed weight: 320 lb (145 kg)

Career information
- High school: Mount Vernon
- College: Iowa (2017–2019)
- NFL draft: 2020: 1st round, 13th overall pick

Career history
- Tampa Bay Buccaneers (2020–present)

Awards and highlights
- Super Bowl champion (LV); 2× First-team All-Pro (2021 (Note: Selected as a Right Tackle), 2024 (Note: Selected as a Left Tackle)); Second-team All-Pro (2022) (Note: Selected as a Right Tackle); 5× Pro Bowl (2021–2025); PFWA All-Rookie Team (2020); First-team All-American (2019); Big Ten Offensive Lineman of the Year (2019); First-team All-Big Ten (2019)

Career NFL statistics as of Week 6, 2026
- Games played: 97
- Games started: 97
- Receiving touchdowns: 1
- Stats at Pro Football Reference

Tristan Patrick Wirfs (born January 24, 1999) is an American professional football offensive tackle for the Tampa Bay Buccaneers of the National Football League (NFL). He played college football for the Iowa Hawkeyes, and was selected in the first round by Tampa Bay in the 2020 NFL draft. He has been selected to five consecutive Pro Bowls.

== Early life ==
Wirfs played high school football at Mount Vernon High School, where he also excelled in wrestling and track and field. He won the state discus throw as a sophomore, and Iowa State and Iowa Hawkeyes both offered Wirfs scholarships within the next month. He committed to Iowa in winter of his junior year in December 2015, and was a four-star recruit. During his senior year of high school, Wirfs helped Mount Vernon to a state semifinal appearance in football, was named an Army All-American for football, won a state wrestling title in winter after cutting 30 pounds, and won the discus for the third straight year and shot put for the second straight year in spring at the Iowa state track-and-field championship meet. He was honored by the Des Moines Register as the best boys prep athlete in the state.

== College career ==
As a true freshman, Wirfs started seven games at right tackle, becoming the first true freshman to start at offensive tackle in the Kirk Ferentz era. Through the season, he worked on being more aggressive against defenders.

Before his sophomore season, Wirfs was suspended for the season-opening game against Northern Illinois for an OWI arrest in late July. After his sophomore season, Wirfs broke the Hawkeyes hang clean record held by Brandon Scherff, setting the new mark at 450 pounds. He also said a focus of his junior season would be to translate his weight room exploits to the field. An injury during spring practice caused Wirfs to miss a few weeks of practice. Following his junior season where he was selected to the First Team All-Big Ten Conference and named the conference lineman of the year, Wirfs announced that he would forgo his final season and enter the 2020 NFL draft.

== Professional career ==
Pre-draft measurables
Height	Weight	Arm length	Hand span	Wingspan	40-yard dash	10-yard split	20-yard split	20-yard shuttle	Three-cone drill	Vertical jump	Broad jump	Bench press	Wonderlic
6 ft 4 7/8 in (1.95 m)	320 lb (145 kg)	34 in (0.86 m)	10 1/4 in (0.26 m)	6 ft 8 1/4 in (2.04 m)	4.85 s	1.69 s	2.80 s	4.68 s	7.65 s	36.5 in (0.93 m)	10 ft 1 in (3.07 m)	24 reps	23
All values from NFL Combine

Wirfs was selected by the Tampa Bay Buccaneers in the first round with the 13th overall pick in the 2020 NFL draft. As a rookie, Wirfs started all 16 games in the 2020 season, playing at right tackle, only allowing 1 sack to Khalil Mack of the Chicago Bears in Week 5. Wirfs played and started all four games in the Buccaneers' playoff run that resulted in the team winning Super Bowl LV. He was named to the PFWA All-Rookie Team. He was ranked 89th by his fellow players on the NFL Top 100 Players of 2021.

Wirfs started all 17 games for the Buccaneers in 2021, before suffering an ankle injury in the Wild Card Round of the playoffs that kept him out the remainder of the season. After another strong year performance wise, Wirfs was named to his first career Pro Bowl and garnered a first-team All-Pro selection. He was ranked 41st by his fellow players on the NFL Top 100 Players of 2022.

Wirfs started 13 out of 17 games for the Buccaneers in 2022. He missed three games after suffering an ankle injury and was inactive for the team's final regular season game as it did not impact playoff seeding. Wirfs was named to his second career Pro Bowl and the All-Pro second team. He was ranked 98th by his fellow players on the NFL Top 100 Players of 2023.

On April 26, 2023, the Buccaneers picked up the fifth-year option of Wirfs' contract. In the 2023 season, Wirfs started all 17 regular season games and both of the Buccaneers' postseason games—switching to left tackle for the first time. He was again selected to the Pro Bowl that season. He was ranked 85th by his fellow players on the NFL Top 100 Players of 2024.

On August 1, 2024, Wirfs and the Buccaneers agreed to a five–year, $140.63 million contract extension, a deal that made him the highest paid offensive lineman in NFL history. Wirfs started 16 out of 17 games in 2024. He was injured midway through the Buccaneers Week 10 game against San Francisco and missed one game. He would be selected to the Pro Bowl for the fourth time in his career. Additionally, Wirfs was named for a second time as first-team All-Pro for 2024. He became the first player in NFL history to be named as first-team All-Pro in both right tackle and left tackle position. Wirfs led all tackles in pass block win rate for the 2024 season at 95.9%. He was ranked 28th by his fellow players on the NFL Top 100 Players of 2025.

In July 2025, the Buccaneers announced Wirfs underwent arthroscopic knee surgery. He made his season debut in week 4 against the Philadelphia Eagles. On November 30, in a week 13 game against the Arizona Cardinals, Wirfs caught his first career touchdown from Baker Mayfield in the 20-17 win. He would miss two additional games in December, including week 14 and the season finale. Despite playing a career-low twelve games in 2025, Wirfs earned his fifth consecutive Pro Bowl recognition and was named a starter.

=== Regular season statistics ===
Legend
	First Team All-Pro
	Second Team All-Pro
	Won the Super Bowl
	No type penalty
**Bold**	Career high

Year	Team	Games		Offense					
Year	Team	GP	GS	Snaps	Pct	Holding	False start	Decl/Pen	Acpt/Pen
2020	TB	16	16	1,073	**100%**	1	2	0	4
2021	TB	17	17	**1,183**	**100%**	1	2	**1**	3
2022	TB	13	13	930	**100%**	1	1	0	3
2023	TB	17	17	1,100	**100%**	0	**5**	0	5
2024	TB	16	16	1,016	94%	**2**	4	**1**	**6**
2025	TB	12	12	777	99%	**2**	2	**1**	4
2026	TB	6	6	399	100%	0	3	**1**	3
Career		97	97	6,478	–	7	19	4	28
