= Williamsburg, Iowa =

- City
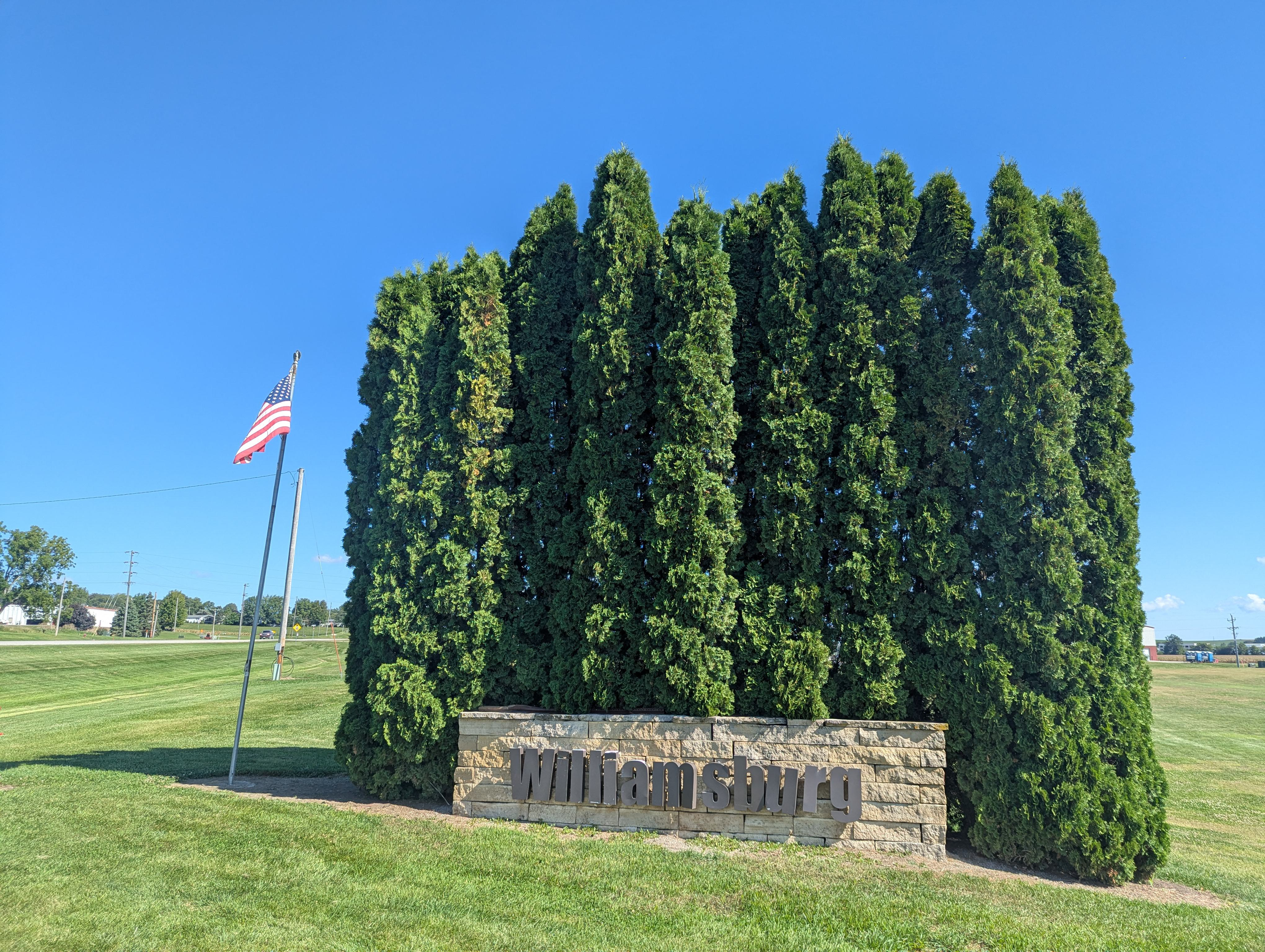
- sign outside of Williamsburg

- Location of Williamsburg, Iowa
- Coordinates: 41°40′01″N 92°00′24″W
- Country: United States
- State: Iowa
- County: Iowa

Area
  - Total: 3.38 sq mi (8.75 km^{2})
  - Land: 3.37 sq mi (8.73 km^{2})
  - Water: 0.0077 sq mi (0.02 km^{2})
- Elevation: 761 ft (232 m)

Population (2020)
  - Total: 3,346
  - Density: 992.8/sq mi (383.32/km^{2})
- Time zone: UTC-6 (Central (CST))
  - Summer (DST): UTC-5 (CDT)
- ZIP code: 52361
- Area code: 319
- FIPS code: 19-85845
- GNIS feature ID: 2397318
- Website: williamsburgiowa.gov

Williamsburg is a city in Iowa County, Iowa, United States. The population was 3,346 at the time of the 2020 census. Williamsburg is known for Holden's Foundation Seeds, a foundation seed corn company, and Kinze Manufacturing, Inc., a farm implement manufacturer.

== History ==
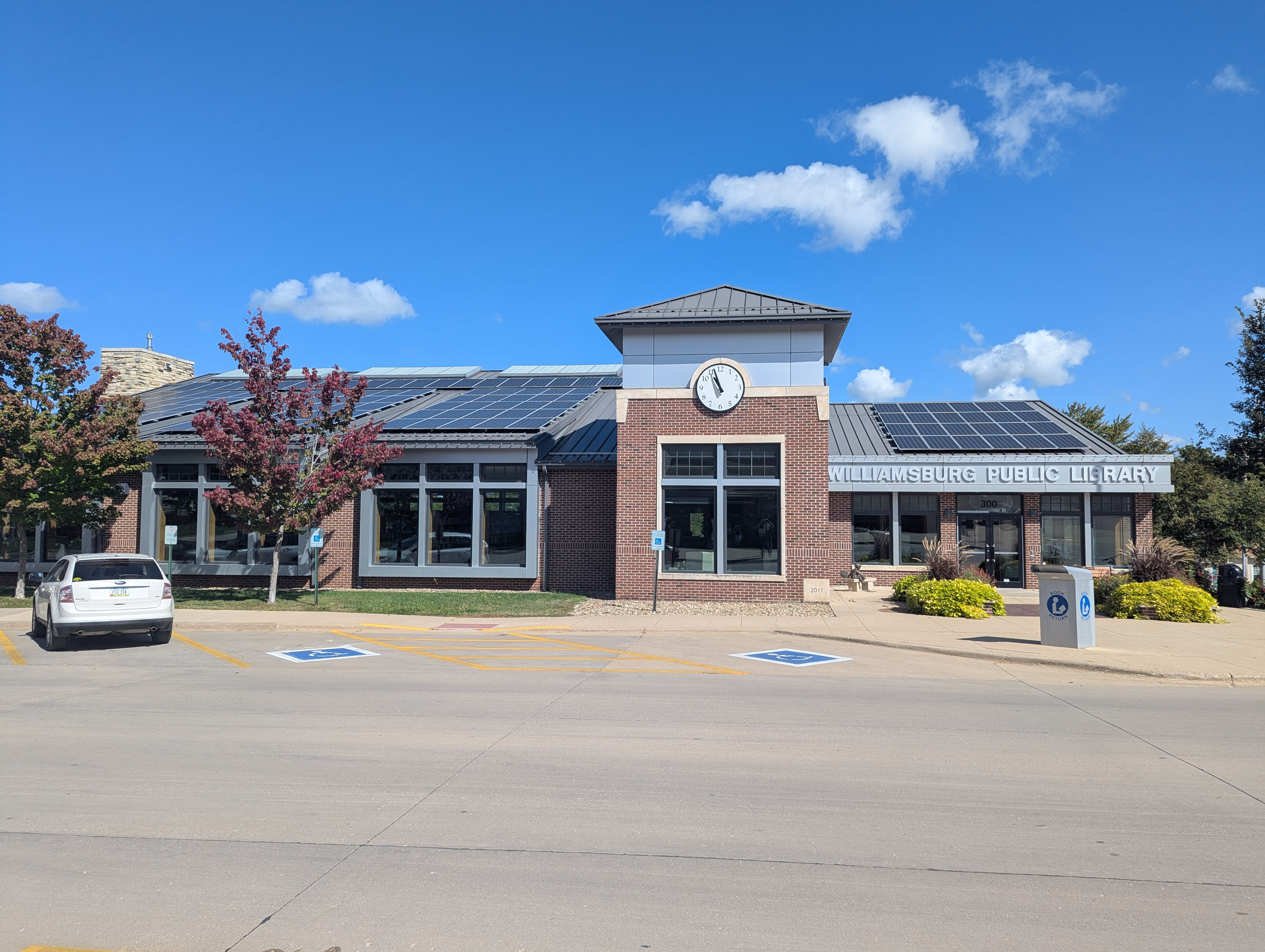
Williamsburg Library

Williamsburg was laid out in 1856 by a Welsh immigrant, Richard Williams. In 1860 the town petitioned to receive a post office, and Homer Paige was declared the postmaster. Paige named the post office Stellapolis, after his youngest daughter Stella. This was likely in an attempt to differentiate the town from nearby Millersburg. In the 1870s there was an attempt to change the name to Chester, and deeds from that decade often list the town as “Chester, formerly Williamsburg.” The name disputes were ended in 1885, when the town was incorporated as Williamsburg after the Chicago, Milwaukee and St. Paul Railroad passed through the year before and brought a population boom.

== Geography ==
According to the United States Census Bureau, the city has a total area of 3.75 square miles (9.71 km^{2}), of which 3.74 square miles (9.69 km^{2}) is land and 0.01 square miles (0.03 km^{2}) is water.

=== Climate ===
According to the Köppen Climate Classification system, Williamsburg has a hot-summer humid continental climate, abbreviated "Dfa" on climate maps. The hottest temperature recorded in Williamsburg was 111 °F (43.9 °C) on August 8, 1934, while the coldest temperature recorded was −31 °F (−35.0 °C) on February 4, 1996, and January 31, 2019.

Climate data for Williamsburg, Iowa, 1991–2020 normals, extremes 1893–present
Month	Jan	Feb	Mar	Apr	May	Jun	Jul	Aug	Sep	Oct	Nov	Dec	Year
Record high °F (°C)	67 (19)	77 (25)	88 (31)	93 (34)	104 (40)	108 (42)	110 (43)	111 (44)	103 (39)	97 (36)	81 (27)	74 (23)	111 (44)
Mean maximum °F (°C)	50.8 (10.4)	57.5 (14.2)	71.9 (22.2)	82.0 (27.8)	88.0 (31.1)	92.7 (33.7)	94.6 (34.8)	93.3 (34.1)	90.8 (32.7)	84.4 (29.1)	69.1 (20.6)	56.7 (13.7)	95.9 (35.5)
Mean daily maximum °F (°C)	28.4 (−2.0)	33.0 (0.6)	46.5 (8.1)	60.4 (15.8)	71.3 (21.8)	80.5 (26.9)	84.0 (28.9)	82.1 (27.8)	76.3 (24.6)	63.0 (17.2)	47.3 (8.5)	34.2 (1.2)	58.9 (14.9)
Daily mean °F (°C)	19.4 (−7.0)	23.7 (−4.6)	36.1 (2.3)	48.4 (9.1)	60.1 (15.6)	69.9 (21.1)	73.3 (22.9)	70.9 (21.6)	63.5 (17.5)	50.8 (10.4)	37.1 (2.8)	25.3 (−3.7)	48.2 (9.0)
Mean daily minimum °F (°C)	10.4 (−12.0)	14.3 (−9.8)	25.8 (−3.4)	36.4 (2.4)	48.9 (9.4)	59.4 (15.2)	62.6 (17.0)	59.7 (15.4)	50.7 (10.4)	38.6 (3.7)	26.9 (−2.8)	16.3 (−8.7)	37.5 (3.1)
Mean minimum °F (°C)	−12.2 (−24.6)	−6.2 (−21.2)	4.9 (−15.1)	22.0 (−5.6)	33.6 (0.9)	46.9 (8.3)	51.3 (10.7)	49.4 (9.7)	35.5 (1.9)	22.9 (−5.1)	9.9 (−12.3)	−3.1 (−19.5)	−16.7 (−27.1)
Record low °F (°C)	−31 (−35)	−31 (−35)	−25 (−32)	5 (−15)	23 (−5)	35 (2)	36 (2)	40 (4)	25 (−4)	−3 (−19)	−12 (−24)	−28 (−33)	−31 (−35)
Average precipitation inches (mm)	1.16 (29)	1.46 (37)	2.19 (56)	3.92 (100)	4.85 (123)	4.80 (122)	4.32 (110)	4.47 (114)	3.80 (97)	2.83 (72)	2.20 (56)	1.69 (43)	37.69 (959)
Average snowfall inches (cm)	7.6 (19)	7.7 (20)	3.6 (9.1)	0.9 (2.3)	0.1 (0.25)	0.0 (0.0)	0.0 (0.0)	0.0 (0.0)	0.0 (0.0)	0.3 (0.76)	1.6 (4.1)	6.3 (16)	28.1 (71.51)
Average precipitation days (≥ 0.01 in)	6.3	6.1	7.8	10.2	11.8	11.3	8.8	9.1	7.9	8.2	7.3	7.2	102.0
Average snowy days (≥ 0.1 in)	4.4	3.7	1.9	0.7	0.0	0.0	0.0	0.0	0.0	0.2	1.0	4.0	15.9
Source 1: NOAA
Source 2: National Weather Service

== Demographics ==
Historical populations
Year	Pop.	±%
1890	635	—
1900	1,100	+73.2%
1910	1,060	−3.6%
1920	1,251	+18.0%
1930	1,219	−2.6%
1940	1,308	+7.3%
1950	1,183	−9.6%
1960	1,342	+13.4%
1970	1,544	+15.1%
1980	2,033	+31.7%
1990	2,174	+6.9%
2000	2,622	+20.6%
2010	3,068	+17.0%
2020	3,346	+9.1%
Source:"U.S. Census website". United States Census Bureau. and Iowa Data Center; Source: U.S. Decennial Census

=== 2020 census ===
As of the 2020 census, Williamsburg had a population of 3,346, with 1,391 households and 864 families. The population density was 992.8 inhabitants per square mile (383.3/km^{2}). There were 1,488 housing units at an average density of 441.5 per square mile (170.5/km^{2}).

0.0% of residents lived in urban areas, while 100.0% lived in rural areas.

Of the 1,391 households, 31.1% had children under the age of 18 living in them. Of all households, 51.4% were married-couple households, 5.1% were cohabitating couples, 28.3% were households with a female householder and no spouse or partner present, and 15.2% were households with a male householder and no spouse or partner present. About 37.9% of households were non-families, 33.4% were made up of individuals, and 16.3% had someone living alone who was 65 years of age or older.

The median age was 39.3 years. 28.4% of residents were under the age of 20; 4.2% were between the ages of 20 and 24; 25.8% were from 25 to 44; 22.6% were from 45 to 64; and 19.1% were 65 years of age or older. In total, 25.9% of residents were under the age of 18. The gender makeup of the city was 47.2% male and 52.8% female. For every 100 females, there were 89.5 males, and for every 100 females age 18 and over, there were 86.5 males age 18 and over.

There were 1,488 housing units, of which 6.5% were vacant. The homeowner vacancy rate was 2.2% and the rental vacancy rate was 8.0%.

Racial composition as of the 2020 census
Race	Number	Percent
White	3,090	92.3%
Black or African American	16	0.5%
American Indian and Alaska Native	5	0.1%
Asian	38	1.1%
Native Hawaiian and Other Pacific Islander	1	0.0%
Some other race	40	1.2%
Two or more races	156	4.7%
Hispanic or Latino (of any race)	120	3.6%

=== 2010 census ===
At the 2010 census there were 3,068 people, 1,309 households, and 835 families living in the city. The population density was 820.3 inhabitants per square mile (316.7/km^{2}). There were 1,428 housing units at an average density of 381.8 per square mile (147.4/km^{2}). The racial makeup of the city was 98.3% White, 0.2% African American, 0.3% Asian, 0.3% from other races, and 0.8% from two or more races. Hispanic or Latino of any race were 1.5%.

Of the 1,309 households 32.2% had children under the age of 18 living with them, 53.2% were married couples living together, 7.3% had a female householder with no husband present, 3.4% had a male householder with no wife present, and 36.2% were non-families. 32.8% of households were one person and 16.2% were one person aged 65 or older. The average household size was 2.31 and the average family size was 2.93.

The median age was 39.1 years. 25.6% of residents were under the age of 18; 6.2% were between the ages of 18 and 24; 25.6% were from 25 to 44; 24.1% were from 45 to 64; and 18.4% were 65 or older. The gender makeup of the city was 47.0% male and 53.0% female.

=== 2000 census ===
At the 2000 census there were 2,622 people, 1,072 households, and 687 families living in the city. The population density was 833.4 inhabitants per square mile (321.8/km^{2}). There were 1,112 housing units at an average density of 353.4 per square mile (136.4/km^{2}). The racial makeup of the city was 97.98% White, 0.11% African American, 0.04% Native American, 0.23% Asian, 0.11% Pacific Islander, 0.99% from other races, and 0.53% from two or more races. Hispanic or Latino of any race were 1.72%.

Of the 1,072 households 35.4% had children under the age of 18 living with them, 53.1% were married couples living together, 8.7% had a female householder with no husband present, and 35.9% were non-families. 31.4% of households were one person and 15.7% were one person aged 65 or older. The average household size was 2.41 and the average family size was 3.10.

The age distribution was 28.9% under the age of 18, 6.7% from 18 to 24, 28.9% from 25 to 44, 19.0% from 45 to 64, and 16.5% 65 or older. The median age was 37 years. For every 100 females, there were 87.8 males. For every 100 females age 18 and over, there were 84.3 males.

The median household income was $36,528 and the median family income was $46,779. Males had a median income of $31,104 versus $24,091 for females. The per capita income for the city was $19,712. About 3.6% of families and 4.3% of the population were below the poverty line, including 3.4% of those under age 18 and 2.7% of those age 65 or over.

== Education ==
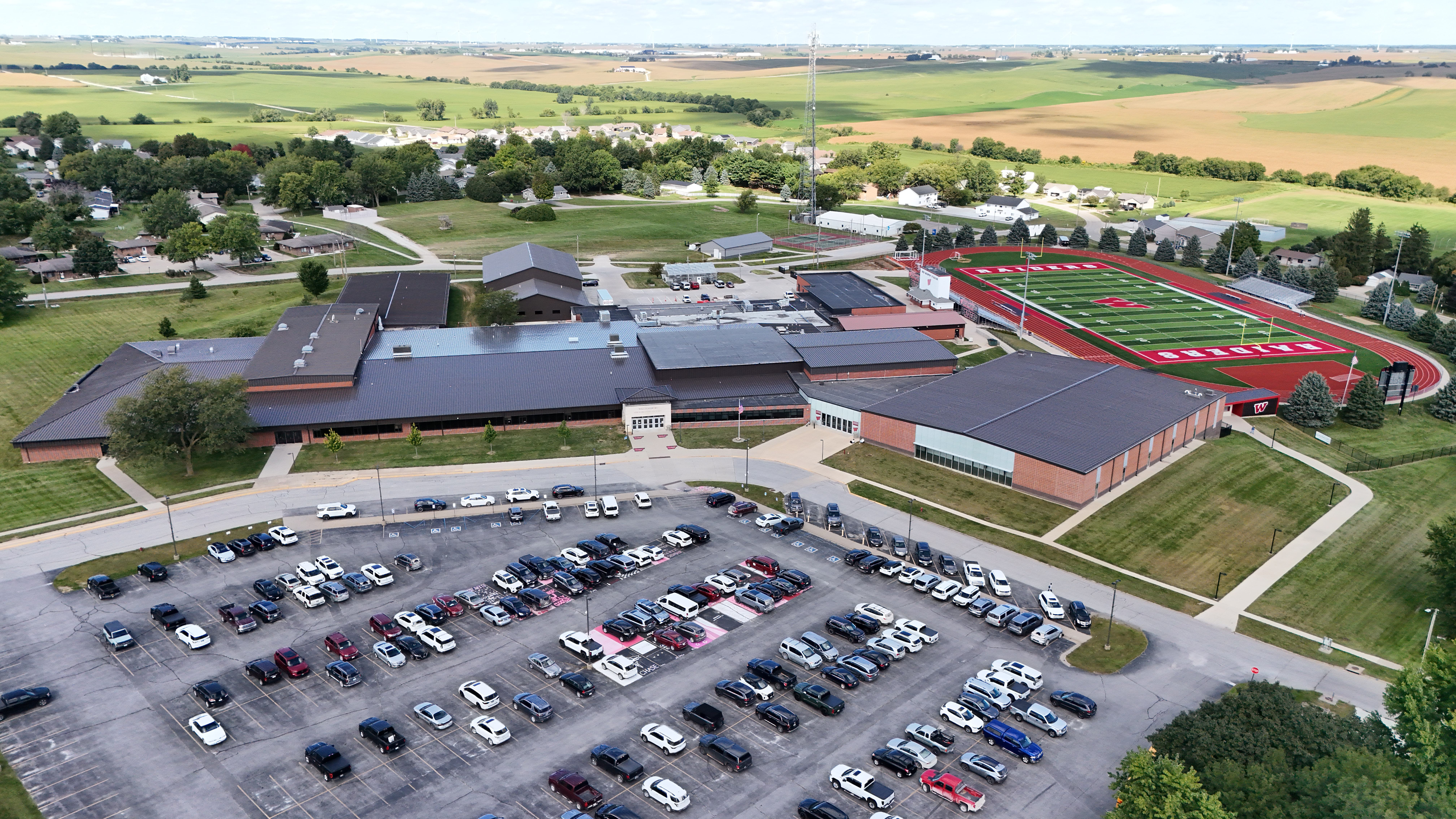
Williamsburg High School

Williamsburg is served by the Williamsburg Community School District.

== Notable people ==
- Robert Bauer, painter
- Austin Blythe, offensive lineman for Iowa Hawkeyes and Kansas City Chiefs
- Eugene Burton Ely, born near Williamsburg, was an aviation pioneer
- Harris Hull, (1909–1993) Brigadier General in the United States Air Force
- Harry E. Hull was a businessman who served in several public offices before becoming U.S. Representative
- William Shannahan was the third president of St. Ambrose University
- Kaden Wetjen, wide receiver and return specialist for the Iowa Hawkeyes and Pittsburgh Steelers
