= Tiffin, Iowa =

- City
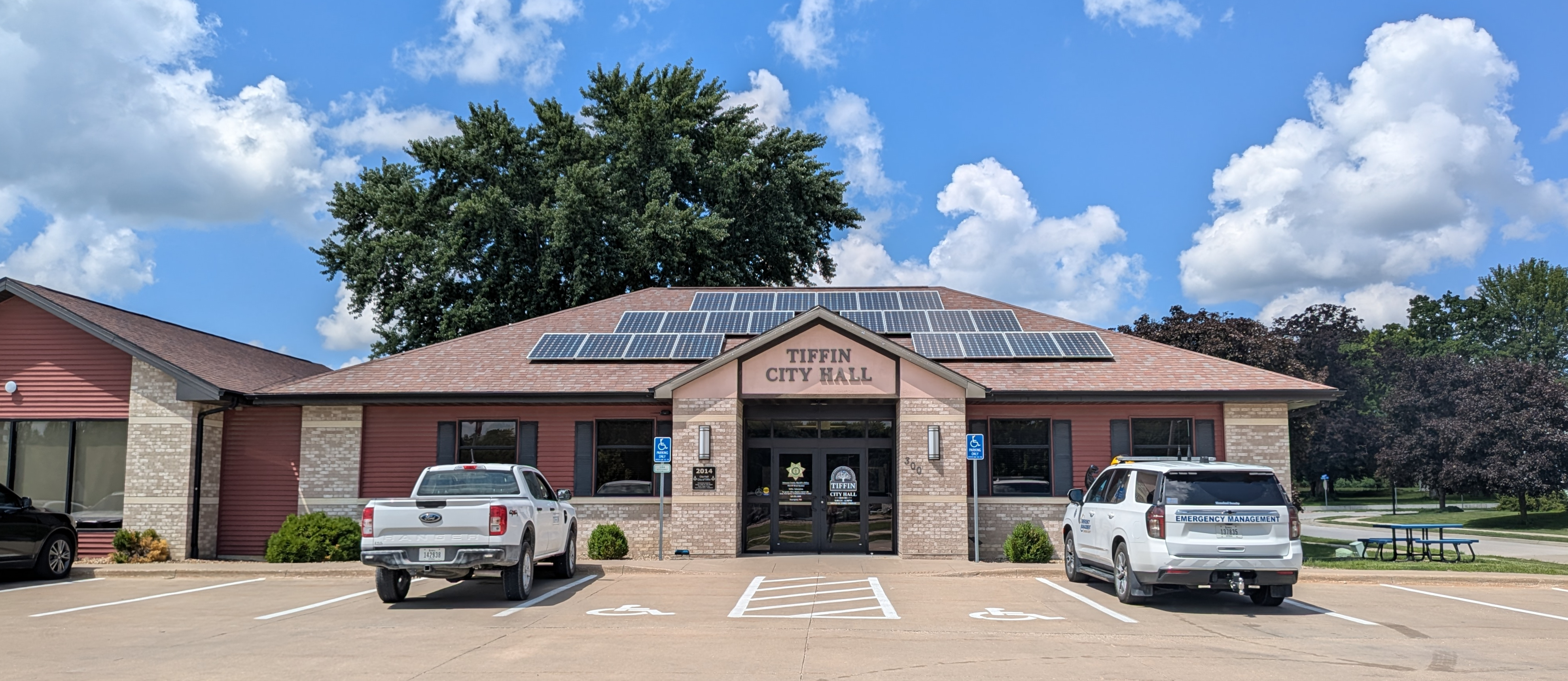
- The 2014 city hall in Tiffin on Railroad Street

- Seal
- Motto: Crossroads of the Heartland
- Location of Tiffin, Iowa
- Coordinates: 41°42′23″N 91°39′32″W
- Country: United States
- State: Iowa
- County: Johnson
- Incorporated: December 27, 1906

Government
  - Type: Mayor-council government
  - Mayor: Tim Kasparek

Area
  - Total: 4.16 sq mi (10.78 km^{2})
  - Land: 4.15 sq mi (10.76 km^{2})
  - Water: 0.0077 sq mi (0.02 km^{2})
- Elevation: 699 ft (213 m)

Population (2020)
  - Total: 4,512
  - Density: 1,085.7/sq mi (419.19/km^{2})
- Time zone: UTC-6 (Central (CST))
  - Summer (DST): UTC-5 (CDT)
- ZIP code: 52340
- Area code: 319
- FIPS code: 19-78060
- GNIS feature ID: 2397023
- Website: http://www.tiffin-iowa.org/

Tiffin is a city in Johnson County, Iowa, United States. It is part of the Iowa City, Iowa Metropolitan Statistical Area. The population was 4,512 at the time of the 2020 census. F. W. Kent County Park is located just to the west of Tiffin, and is a popular site for outdoor recreation in Johnson County, being noted for its lake, camping facilities, resident whitetail deer herd and wild turkeys, and its cross-country ski trails through rolling acres of oak and hickory forest.

== History ==
Tiffin was platted in 1867. The name was a transfer from Tiffin, Ohio, the former home of Rolla Johnson, who owned the town site.

== Geography ==
According to the United States Census Bureau, the city has a total area of 4.14 square miles (10.72 km^{2}), of which 4.13 square miles (10.70 km^{2}) is land and 0.01 square miles (0.03 km^{2}) is water.

== Demographics ==
Historical population
Census	Pop.	Note	%±
1880	47		—
1890	65		38.3%
1900	77		18.5%
1910	176		128.6%
1920	178		1.1%
1930	206		15.7%
1940	240		16.5%
1950	256		6.7%
1960	311		21.5%
1970	299		−3.9%
1980	413		38.1%
1990	460		11.4%
2000	975		112.0%
2010	1,947		99.7%
2020	4,512		131.7%
U.S. Decennial Census

=== 2020 census ===
As of the 2020 census, Tiffin had a population of 4,512, with 1,749 households and 1,178 families. The population density was 1,085.7 inhabitants per square mile (419.2/km^{2}). There were 1,978 housing units at an average density of 476.0 per square mile (183.8/km^{2}).

Of the 1,749 households, 39.5% had children under the age of 18 living with them, 50.4% were married couples living together, 10.2% were cohabitating couples, 23.8% had a female householder with no spouse or partner present, and 15.6% had a male householder with no spouse or partner present. About 32.6% of all households were non-families, 23.5% of all households were made up of individuals, and 5.8% had someone living alone who was 65 years old or older.

The median age was 31.8 years. 29.7% of residents were under the age of 20, including 27.5% under the age of 18. 6.1% were between the ages of 20 and 24, 36.5% were from 25 to 44, 19.5% were from 45 to 64, and 8.1% were 65 years of age or older. The gender makeup of the city was 49.7% male and 50.3% female. For every 100 females there were 98.9 males, and for every 100 females age 18 and over there were 93.0 males age 18 and over.

96.8% of residents lived in urban areas, while 3.2% lived in rural areas. Of the housing stock, 11.6% of units were vacant. The homeowner vacancy rate was 8.8% and the rental vacancy rate was 10.2%.

Racial composition as of the 2020 census
Race	Number	Percent
White	3,720	82.4%
Black or African American	224	5.0%
American Indian and Alaska Native	13	0.3%
Asian	111	2.5%
Native Hawaiian and Other Pacific Islander	2	0.0%
Some other race	125	2.8%
Two or more races	317	7.0%
Hispanic or Latino (of any race)	248	5.5%

=== 2010 census ===
As of the census of 2010, there were 1,947 people, 800 households, and 488 families living in the city. The population density was 471.4 inhabitants per square mile (182.0/km^{2}). There were 848 housing units at an average density of 205.3 per square mile (79.3/km^{2}). The racial makeup of the city was 92.0% White, 2.5% African American, 0.3% Native American, 1.6% Asian, 0.1% Pacific Islander, 0.5% from other races, and 3.0% from two or more races. Hispanic or Latino of any race were 3.6% of the population.

There were 800 households, of which 35.4% had children under the age of 18 living with them, 45.5% were married couples living together, 11.3% had a female householder with no husband present, 4.3% had a male householder with no wife present, and 39.0% were non-families. 27.8% of all households were made up of individuals, and 5.4% had someone living alone who was 65 years of age or older. The average household size was 2.43 and the average family size was 3.04.

The median age in the city was 31.2 years. 27.4% of residents were under the age of 18; 8.6% were between the ages of 18 and 24; 37.3% were from 25 to 44; 19.8% were from 45 to 64; and 6.7% were 65 years of age or older. The gender makeup of the city was 48.9% male and 51.1% female.

=== 2000 census ===
As of the census of 2000, there were 975 people, 440 households, and 268 families living in the city. The population density was 326.2 inhabitants per square mile (125.9/km^{2}). There were 457 housing units at an average density of 152.9 per square mile (59.0/km^{2}). The racial makeup of the city was 95.18% White, 1.95% African American, 1.33% Asian, 0.10% Pacific Islander, 0.41% from other races, and 1.03% from two or more races. Hispanic or Latino of any race were 2.36% of the population.

There were 441 households, out of which 30.0% had children under the age of 18 living with them, 47.0% were married couples living together, 11.1% had a female householder with no husband present, and 38.9% were non-families. 29.8% of all households were made up of individuals, and 5.0% had someone living alone who was 65 years of age or older. The average household size was 2.22 and the average family size was 2.75.

23.1% are under the age of 18, 11.8% from 18 to 24, 40.8% from 25 to 44, 17.6% from 45 to 64, and 6.7% who were 65 years of age or older. The median age was 30 years. For every 100 females, there were 97.4 males. For every 100 females age 18 and over, there were 97.4 males.

The median income for a household in the city was $42,381, and the median income for a family was $47,969. Males had a median income of $30,857 versus $25,542 for females. The per capita income for the city was $20,222. About 3.7% of families and 4.3% of the population were below the poverty line, including 5.6% of those under age 18 and 7.0% of those age 65 or over.

== Transportation ==
Tiffin is located at the junction of Interstates 80 and 380. The Clear Creek bicycle recreation trail passes through the city and extends to nearby Iowa City (6 miles). There is no scheduled public transportation connecting the city. Thus, commuting to Iowa City employment is primarily by automobile. The Tiffin project website does not list any planned public transit improvements.

== Education ==
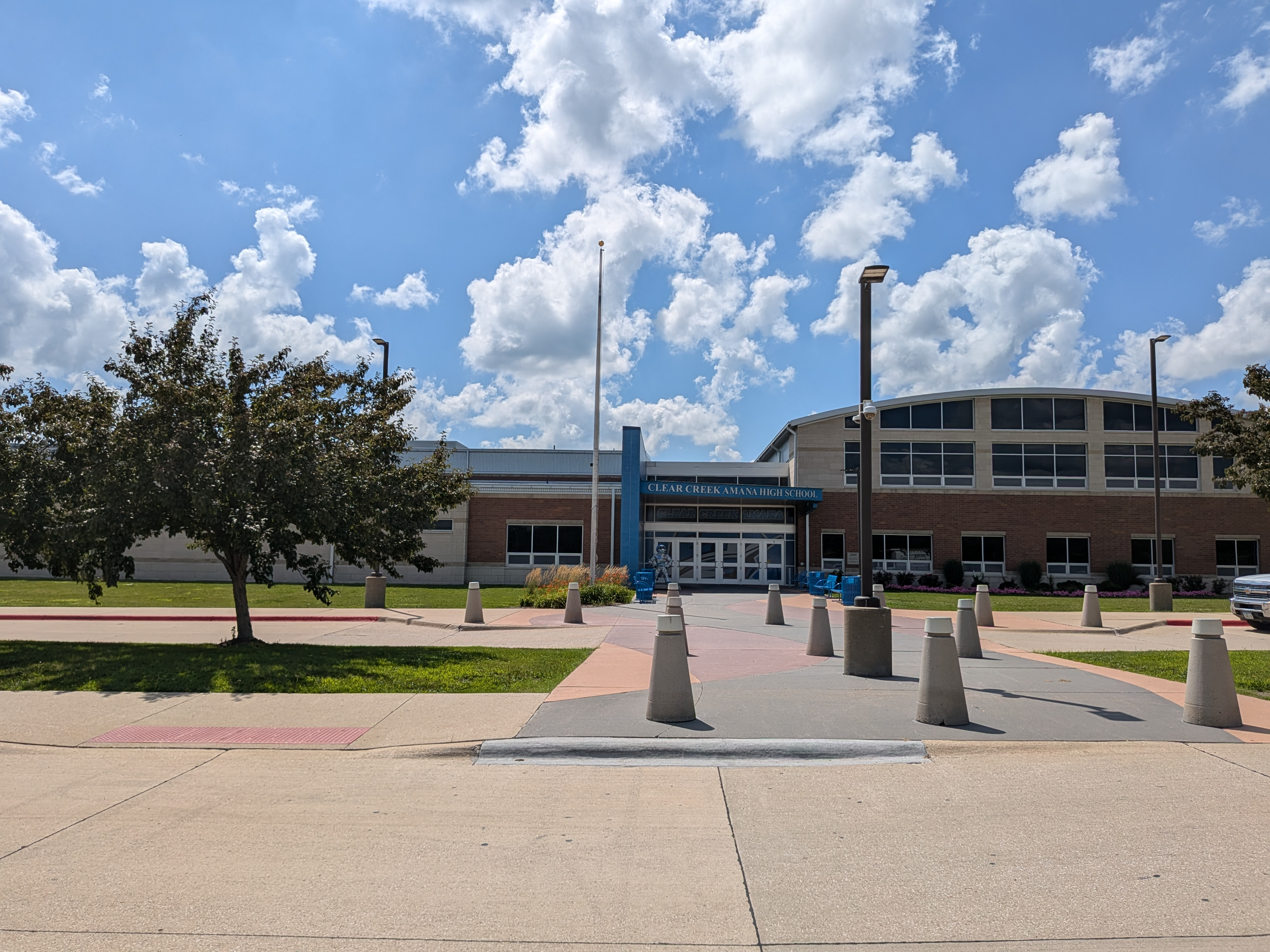
Clear Creek - Amana High School

Tiffin is a part of the Clear Creek–Amana Community School District and houses Tiffin Elementary School, Clear Creek–Amana Middle School, and Clear Creek–Amana High School.
