= Terrace Park Historic District =

Historic district in Iowa, United States

- U.S. National Register of Historic Places
- U.S. Historic district
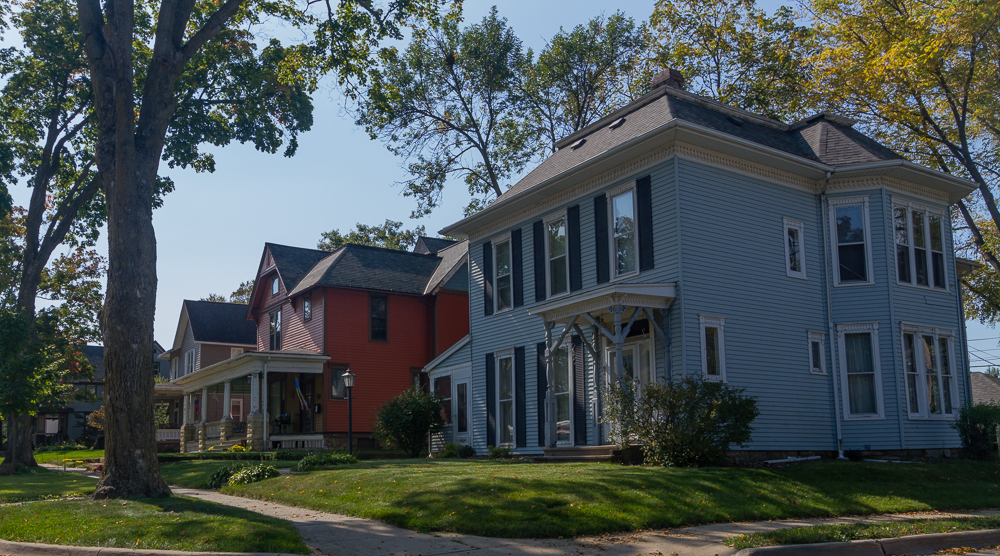

- Location within Iowa Location within the United States
- Location: Roughly bounded by 10th Ave., 9th Ave., 11th St., and the eastern side of 12th St., Marion, Iowa
- Coordinates: 42°02′15″N 91°35′50″W
- Area: 3 acres (1.2 ha)
- Architectural style: Late Victorian; Late 19th and Early 20th Century American Movements
- NRHP reference No.: 06000953
- Added to NRHP: October 25, 2006

The Terrace Park Historic District is a nationally recognized historic district located in Marion, Iowa, United States. It was listed on the National Register of Historic Places in 2006. At the time of its nomination it consisted of 27 resources, which included 20 contributing buildings and seven non-contributing buildings. The historic district is a residential area north of Marion's central business district. Like the nearby Pucker Street Historic District, Terrace Park is where the city's wealthy and influential citizens built their houses.

Marion was established was one of the first towns in Linn County in 1839, and it served as its first county seat until 1919. Its early development came about because of its status. The houses here were built between 1874 and 1904, with additions and updates occurring until about 1930. Because of the prominence of its residents, the popular architectural styles of the era are found here, especially the various Victorian styles still in vogue.
