= William and Phebe C. Dunn House =

Historic house in Iowa, United States

- U.S. National Register of Historic Places
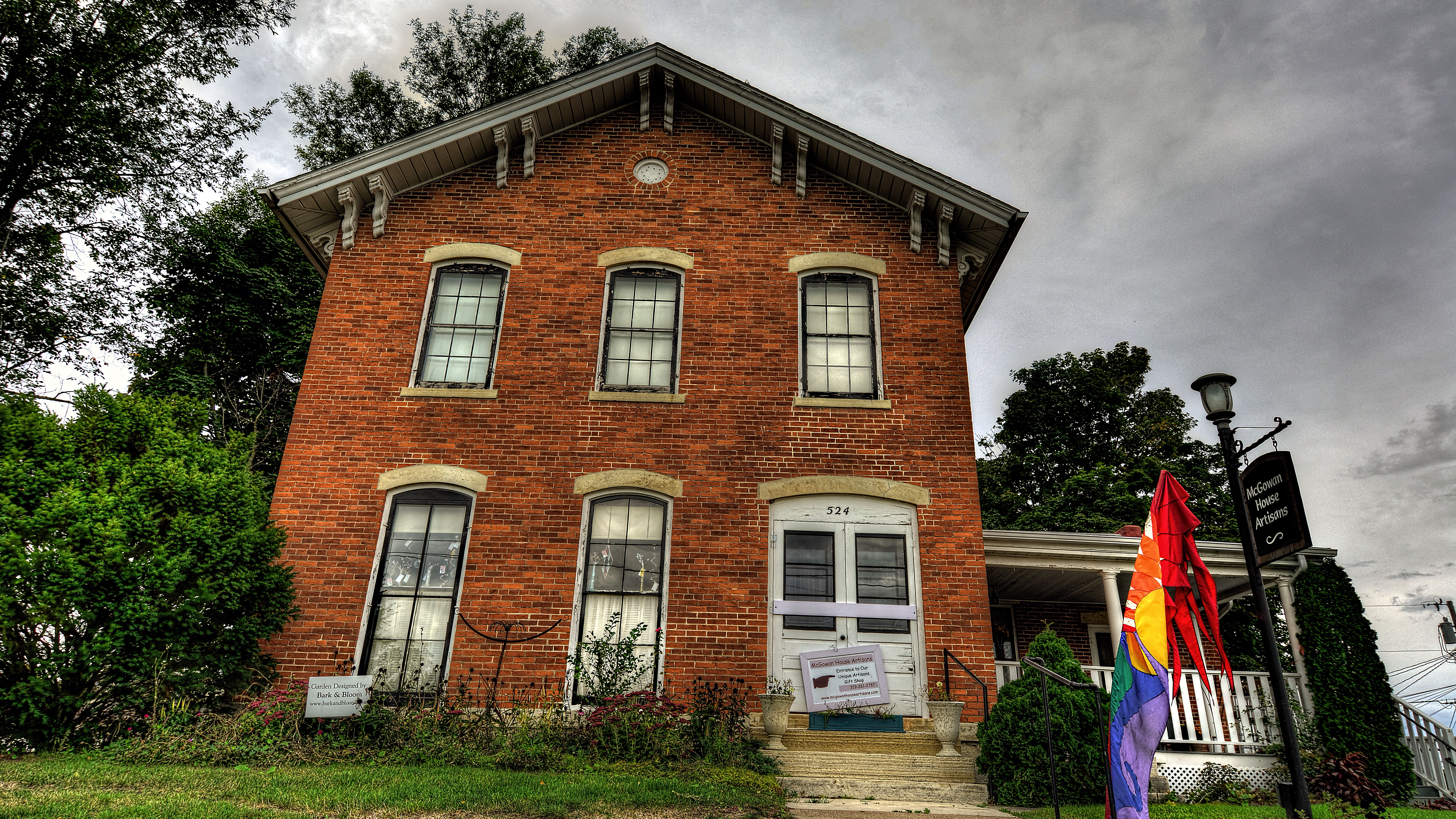

- Location within Iowa
- Location: 524 10th St. Marion, Iowa
- Coordinates: 42°01′54.1″N 91°35′58.5″W
- Area: less than one acre
- Built: 1866
- Architectural style: Italianate
- NRHP reference No.: 13000663
- Added to NRHP: September 4, 2013

The William and Phebe C. Dunn House is a historic building located in Marion, Iowa, United States. This two-story, brick dwelling is a vernacular version of the Italianate style, which was popular at the time it was built in 1866. It is a well-preserved example of a pioneer-era dwelling from the time period that Marion was the county seat of Linn County. The house was constructed by local masons and other craftsmen, utilizing locally produced brick and limestone quarried in the region. It features bracketed eaves and limestone lintels and sills. The house is architecturally similar to the buildings in the nearby Marion Commercial Historic District. It was listed on the National Register of Historic Places in 2013.
