= Pyle House =

Pyle House may refer to:

- Howard Pyle Studios, Wilmington, DE, listed on the NRHP in Delaware
- Joshua Pyle House and Wagon Barn, Wilmington, DE, listed on the NRHP in Delaware
- Pyle-Davis House, Demorest, GA, listed on the NRHP in Georgia
- Glenn O. and Lucy O. Pyle House, Marion, IA, listed on the NRHP in Iowa
- Ernie Pyle House, Albuquerque, NM, listed on the NRHP in New Mexico
- Pyle House (Huron, South Dakota), listed on the NRHP in South Dakota
