= Bryce Janey =

American singer-songwriter & guitarist

- Born: Marion, Iowa, United States
- Genres: Blues rock
- Occupations: Singer, guitarist, songwriter
- Instruments: Vocals, guitar
- Years active: 1980s–present
- Website: Official website

Bryce Janey is an American blues rock singer, guitarist, and songwriter. He has performed onstage with Kenny Neal, Buddy Guy, Tab Benoit, and Koko Taylor. In 2007, Janey was inducted into the Iowa Rock 'n' Roll Hall of Fame. Including his October 2022 release, Blue Moon Rising, Janey has issued 13 solo albums since 1995.

== Life and career ==
He was born in Marion, Iowa, United States. He began his career at the age of 13, performing on guitar alongside his father (guitar) and mother (drums) in a family-based blues rock trio, the Janeys. They played across the area from Chicago, Illinois, to Los Angeles, California. The family later relocated to Cedar Rapids, Iowa. The Janeys shared a stage with acts including Buddy Guy, Delbert McClinton, Blues Traveler, Johnny Winter, and Elvin Bishop. Both he and his father, Billy Lee Janey, were inducted in to the Iowa Rock 'n' Roll Hall of Fame. The duo sometimes still perform in a four- or five-piece band billed as the Janeys; although his mother no longer performs with them.

Even though he was still performing with the Janeys at the time, Bryce Janey launched his solo career in 1995, and released his debut album, Practice What You Preach, that year. His next solo release was Sweet Baby Jane (1998) via Blue Sunday Entertainment. In 1999, Bare Wire, was issued on Hot Fudge Records and garnered some positive trade magazine reviews. The same year Janey joined the Cedar Falls-based outfit, the Blue Band, as vocalist and guitarist. Janey was in the Blue Band from 1999 to 2002.

In 2001, he released his first solo live album, Live at J.M. O'Malley's. In 2010, he released Blues In My Soul. It was Janey's sixth solo release, and featured 13 tracks and saw Janey backed by Dan Johnson (bass) and Eric Douglas (drums). The album was recorded at Catamount Recording Studio and produced by Tom Tatman. Game of Life followed in 2011, which saw a release party held in Cedar Rapids. The album was Janey's eighth solo release and his second on the Grooveyard Records label. Game of Life again featured the rhythm section of Dan Johnson and Eric Douglas. Janey triumphed at the Iowa Blues Challenge in 2011, and in 2012 was an International Blues Challenge semi-finalist in Memphis, Tennessee. With his father, Billy Lee Janey, Bryce Janey stated at the time "we did a handful of festivals together this summer and will release a new Janey's Band CD for Grooveyard this winter". In 2011, he released two albums: Down Home Blues and Game of Life. Janey also played part-time with Perry Welsh and Tommy "T-Bone" Giblin in a band called the Pumpers. 2013 saw the release of Burning Flame which included a version of Free's "The Stealer". Delta Road (2015) was the tenth album recorded by Janey, with Johnson and Douglas providing the rhythm. Perry Welsh played harmonica on Janey's acoustic dobro version of Robert Johnson's, "Hellhound on My Trail". The other non-original on Delta Road was Janey's take on Rory Gallagher's "Lonesome Highway". His CD, Brand New Day, (2018) was preceded by a mainly acoustic album, Organic Man (2016).

In September 2021, Janey played live at the Electric Thread Social Club's Patio, Hotel Millwright, in Amana, Iowa.

Janey has released a number of albums on Grooveyard Records, who are based out of Rochester, New York. He has performed at many major music festivals and clubs over the years including: B.B. Kings Blues Club in Memphis, Blues Excreta Club in Chicago, Illinois, the Kansas City Blues and Jazz Festival, Beale Street Music Festival, Buddy Guy's Legends Blues Fest (Chicago Blues Festival, 1990), Ribfest-Fort Wayne, Indiana and the Mississippi Valley Blues Festival in 2012.

== Discography ==
=== Albums ===
Year	Title	Record label
1995	Practice What You Preach	Hot Fudge Records
1998	Sweet Baby Jane	Blue Sunday Entertainment
1999	Bare Wire	Hot Fudge Records
2001	Live at J.M. O'Malley's	Hot Fudge Records
2006	Heal The Night	3rd Avenue Music
2010	Blues In My Soul	Grooveyard Records
2011	Down Home Blues	Self-released
2011	Game of Life	Grooveyard Records
2013	Burning Flame	Grooveyard Records
2015	Delta Road	Grooveyard Records
2016	Organic Man	Stray Dog Records
2018	Brand New Day	Grooveyard Records
2022	Blue Moon Rising	Grooveyard Records
