= Samuel M. Lane House =

Historic house in Iowa, United States

- U.S. National Register of Historic Places
- U.S. Historic district – Contributing property
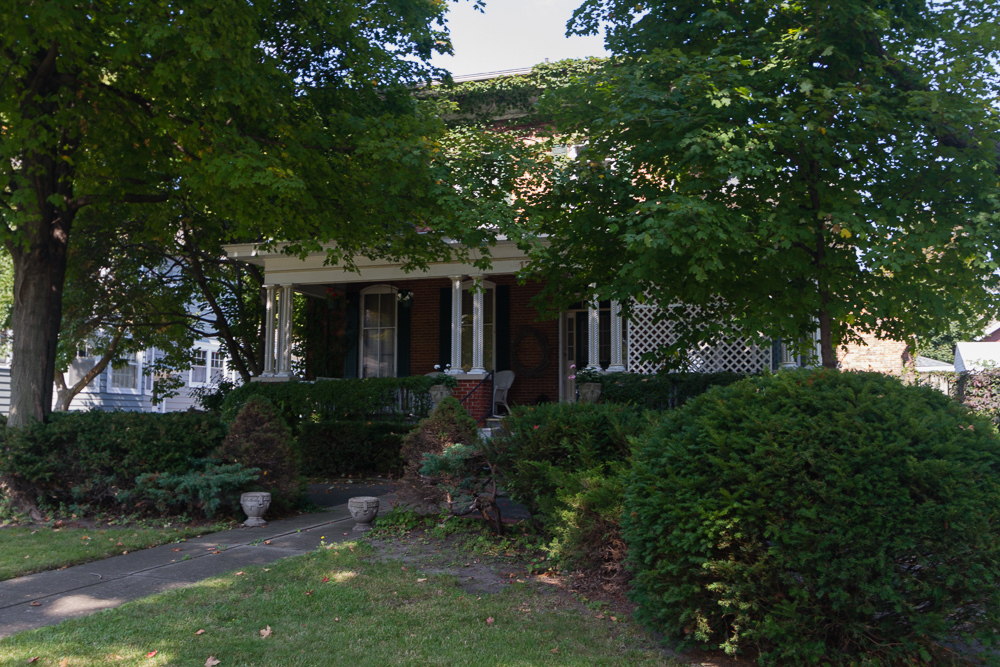

- Location within Iowa Location within the United States
- Location: 1776 8th Ave. Marion, Iowa
- Coordinates: 42°02′04.2″N 91°35′31.5″W
- Area: less than one acre
- Built: 1868
- Architectural style: Italianate
- Part of: Pucker Street Historic District (ID02001013)
- NRHP reference No.: 02001014
- Added to NRHP: September 14, 2002

The Samuel M. Lane House is a historic building located in Marion, Iowa, United States. This two-story Italianate style dwelling was built in 1868 using locally produced brick. It is in a neighborhood where the community's more prominent citizens built their homes in the late 19th and early 20th centuries. It features a low-pitched hip roof, a limestone foundation, a two-story rear ell, and wide eaves that had brackets that were removed in the 1930s. The original carriage house attached to the back of the house has been converted into a den, and the present wrap-around porch replaced original full length front porch in the 1930s. The house was individually listed on the National Register of Historic Places in 2002. At the same time it was included as a contributing property in the Pucker Street Historic District.
