= James W. and Ida G. Bowman House =

Historic house in Iowa, United States

- U.S. National Register of Historic Places
- U.S. Historic district – Contributing property
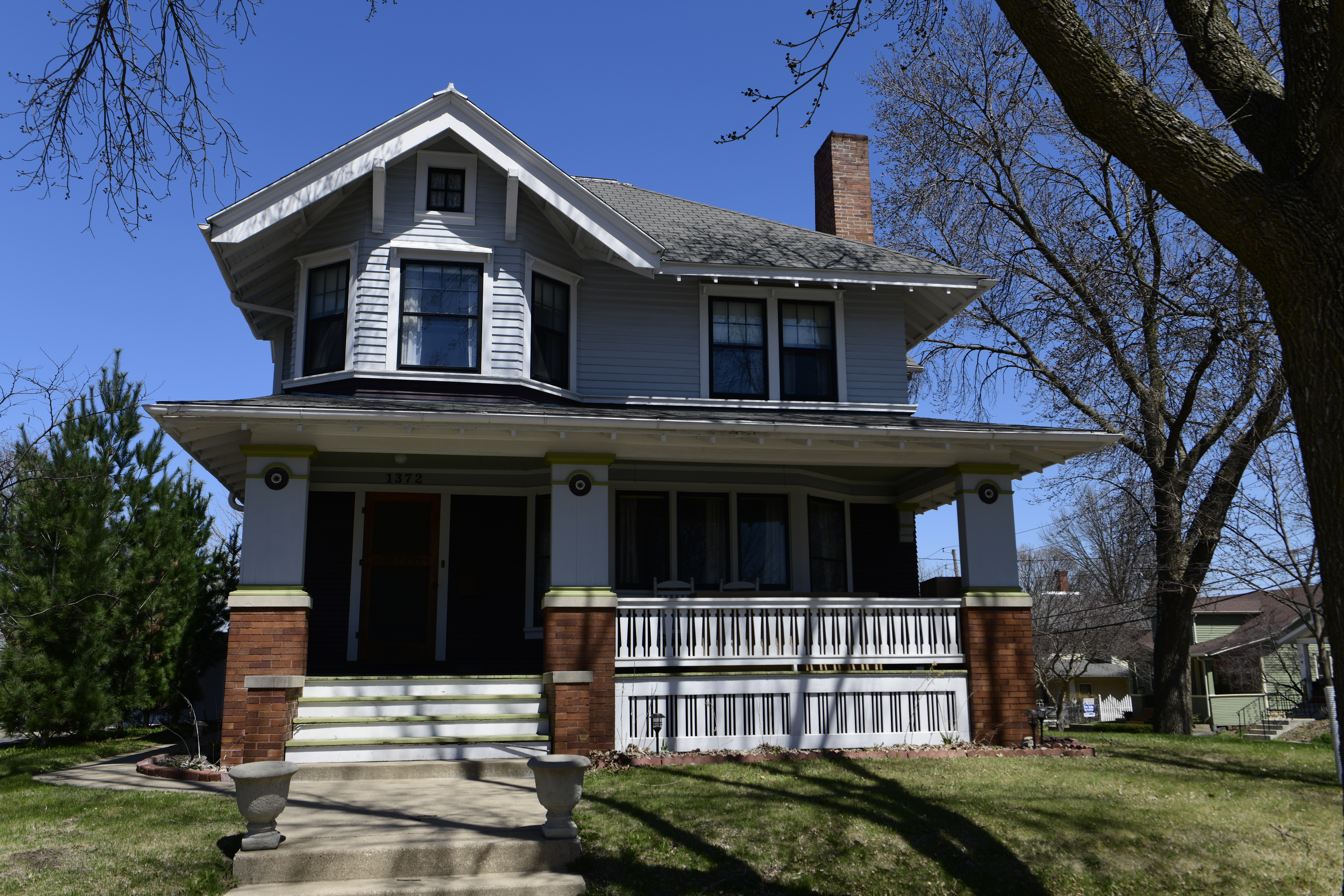

- Location within Iowa Location within the United States
- Location: 1372 8th Ave. Marion, Iowa
- Coordinates: 42°02′03.8″N 91°35′41.5″W
- Area: less than one acre
- Built: 1909-1910
- Built by: Charles I. Wilson
- Architect: Dieman & Fiske
- Architectural style: Bungalow/American Craftsman; Prairie School
- Part of: Pucker Street Historic District (ID02001013)
- NRHP reference No.: 02001015
- Added to NRHP: September 14, 2002

The James W. and Ida G. Bowman House is a historic building located in Marion, Iowa, United States. The Bowmans hired the Cedar Rapids architectural firm of Dieman & Fiske, and specifically partner Charles Dieman, to design this two-story wood-frame house that combines American Craftsman and Prairie School influences. Local contractor Charles I. Wilson completed construction in 1910 in a neighborhood populated by prominent citizens. The wide overhanging eaves with exposed rafter ends reflects the Craftsman style, while the square massing and horizontal emphasis of the siding and roofline of the porch are typical of the Prairie School style. The house was individually listed on the National Register of Historic Places in 2002. At the same time it was included as a contributing property in the Pucker Street Historic District.
