= Marion station (Iowa) =

Railroad station in Marion, Iowa, USA

Marion
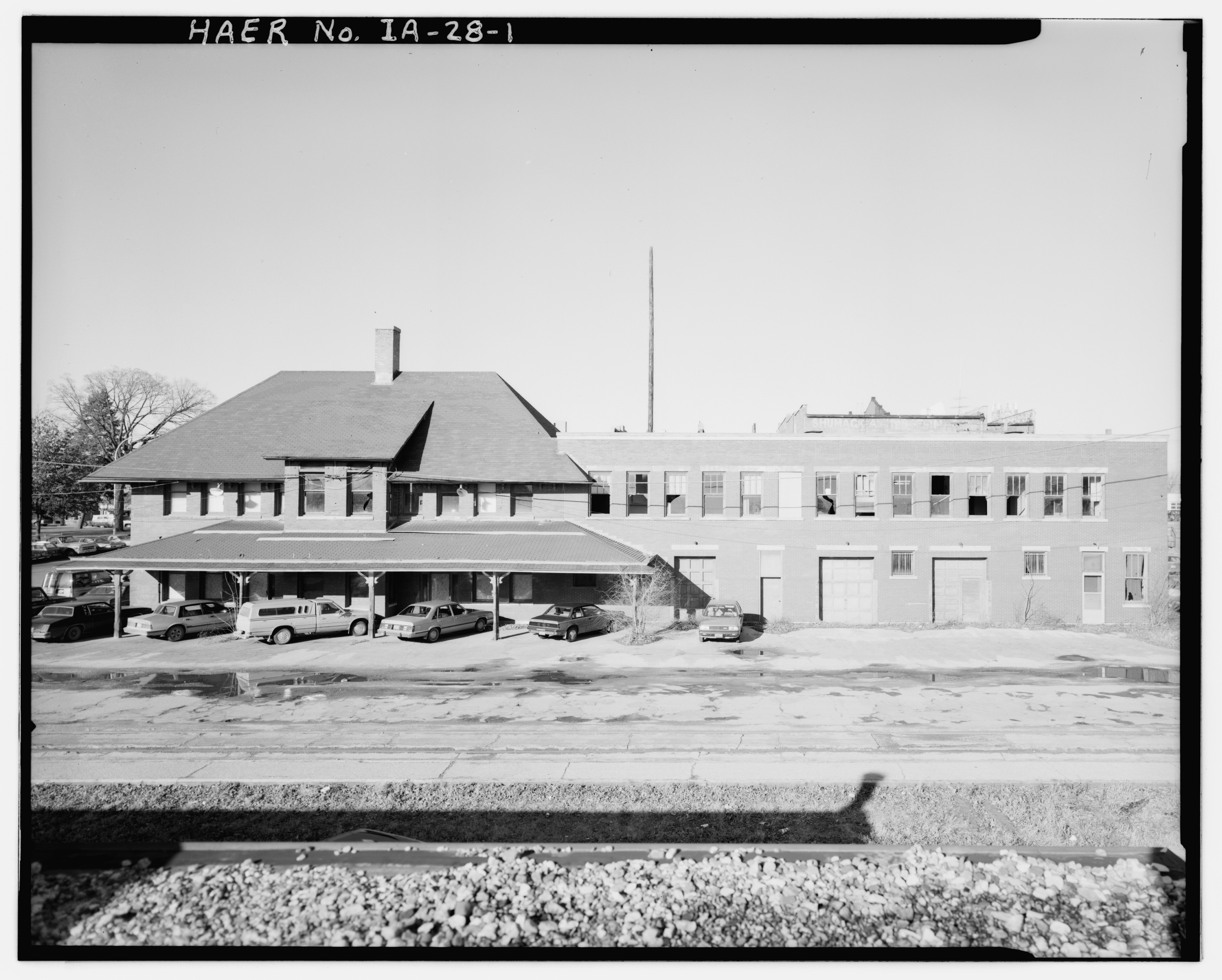
- The south side of the building while the station was still in use

General information
- Location: 1104 South Sixth Avenue; Marion, Iowa
- Coordinates: 42.032664°N 91.598670°W
- System: Milwaukee Road inter-city rail station
- Owner: City of Marion
- Tracks: 2

Construction
- Structure type: at-grade

History
- Opened: 1873
- Closed: 1971
- Rebuilt: 1878, 1888

Services
| Preceding station | Milwaukee Road | Following station |
|---|---|---|
| Louisa toward Omaha | Omaha – Chicago | Paralta toward Chicago |
| Cedar Rapids Terminus | Cedar Rapids – Calmar | Paralta toward Calmar |
Location

Marion station was a railroad station in Marion, Iowa. It served passenger trains of the Chicago, Milwaukee, St. Paul and Pacific Railroad, commonly known as the Milwaukee Road. After passenger train service was discontinued, elements of the station were moved across the street to City Square Park, where it remains as a pavilion today. The structure is listed as a non-contributing property by the National Register of Historic Places in the Marion Commercial Historic District.

== History ==
The first railroad line through Marion was built by the Dubuque Southwestern Railroad, extending westward from Anamosa and Springville in 1863. It then expanded southwest to the city of Cedar Rapids in 1865. This railroad later became under control of the Milwaukee Road in 1881. The second line to Marion was completed in December 1872 by the Sabula, Ackley and Dakota Railroad Company. This line extended east to Sabula, Iowa and the Mississippi River. On July 2, 1872, the Milwaukee Road also took control of this railroad, including it in its Iowa Division. The Milwaukee Road built westward from Marion to Council Bluffs, and opened the line in 1882. This gave the Milwaukee Road access to the important city of Omaha.

In 1888, a two-story brick station was built by the Milwaukee Road for $30,000. This station was the third station in Marion, replacing stations built in 1873 and 1878. The town was then established as a division point of the Iowa District First Division, relocated from Van Horne, 27 miles (43 km) west of Marion. With the division point moving to Marion, maintenance shops and a roundhouse were also built on the eastern edge of town. The development of the railroad was considered vital to the growth of Marion, and the Milwaukee Road was the largest employer in Marion at one point. A streetcar station was also established across the street from the Milwaukee Road station, and has since been demolished.

The division point was shifted away from Marion to Atkins in 1918. The now-obsolete roundhouse and other shops were demolished. This was considered a major factor in the decline of Marion. The station continued to serve trains on its main line between Chicago and Omaha, and branches to Calmar and Ottumwa (and on to Kansas City). In 1925, the town saw 20 passenger trains and 30 freight trains. Named passenger trains serving Marion included The Arrow and the Midwest Hiawatha. A bus connection to Cedar Rapids was also listed.

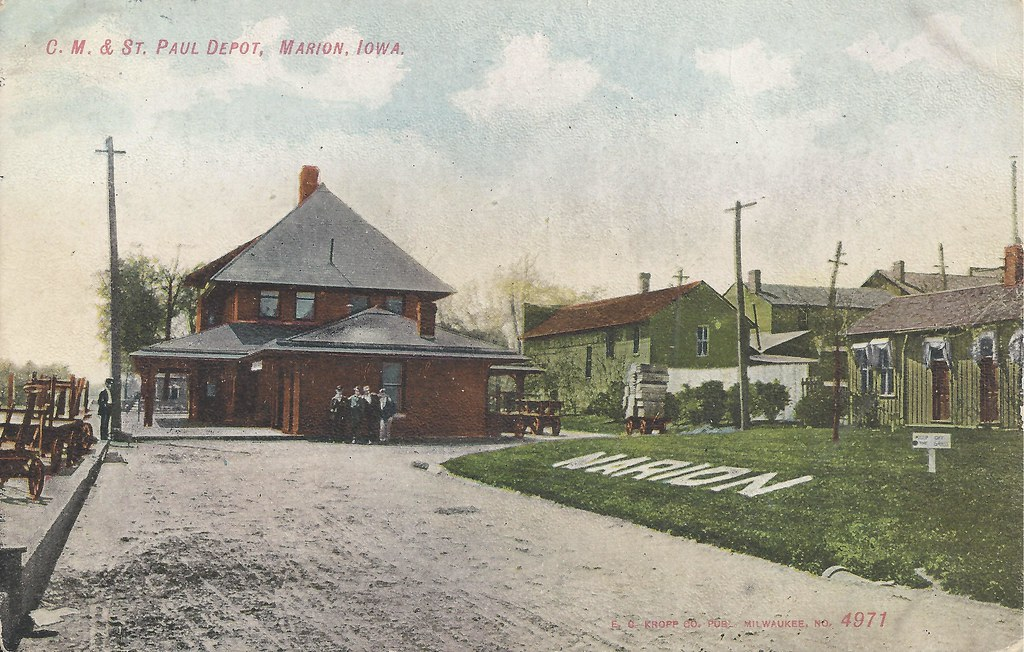
A postcard of the station in 1911.

In 1955, passenger trains of the Union Pacific Railroad were shifted from the Chicago and North Western Railway (C&NW) to the Milwaukee Road for their Omaha–Chicago section. Streamliners such as the City of Denver, City of Portland, City of Los Angeles and the City of San Francisco now served Marion, after originally serving Cedar Rapids Union Station on the C&NW. Eventually, the trains were consolidated into one train, dubbed the "City of Everywhere." Amtrak took over intercity rail in the United States on May 1, 1971. The line through Marion was not kept in service and the last Milwaukee Road passenger train to board passengers in Marion on April 30, 1971.

The station remained in use as offices for the Milwaukee Road until the railroad went bankrupt in 1980. The station was then bought by two local residents, in an attempt to save the structure. Efforts to move the structure or restore it were seen as too expensive. With demolition of the structure looming, a deal was struck to move the structure across 11th Street to City Square Park. The roof was moved and 19,000 bricks from the station were used for a new pavilion. A caboose and other rail cars from the Cedar Rapids and Iowa City Railway were also situated in the park. The surrounding commercial area was listed as a historic district in 2009, but the structure was listed as "non-contributing" as it is "essentially a modern building."

== Station description ==
The 1888 station was built of brick, and contained multiple waiting rooms on the first floor: one for men and one for women. The first floor was finished with wood, and also contained space for a ticket's office and baggage/mail area. The second floor was used for offices of the railroad superintendent and train dispatcher. It contained a bay window so both directions of the tracks could be viewed. The railroad tracks were located on the north side of 6th Avenue, in a street running configuration. The right-of-way is now used as a rail trail known as the Grant Wood Trail.
