= Marion Carnegie Public Library =

- U.S. National Register of Historic Places
- U.S. Historic district – Contributing property
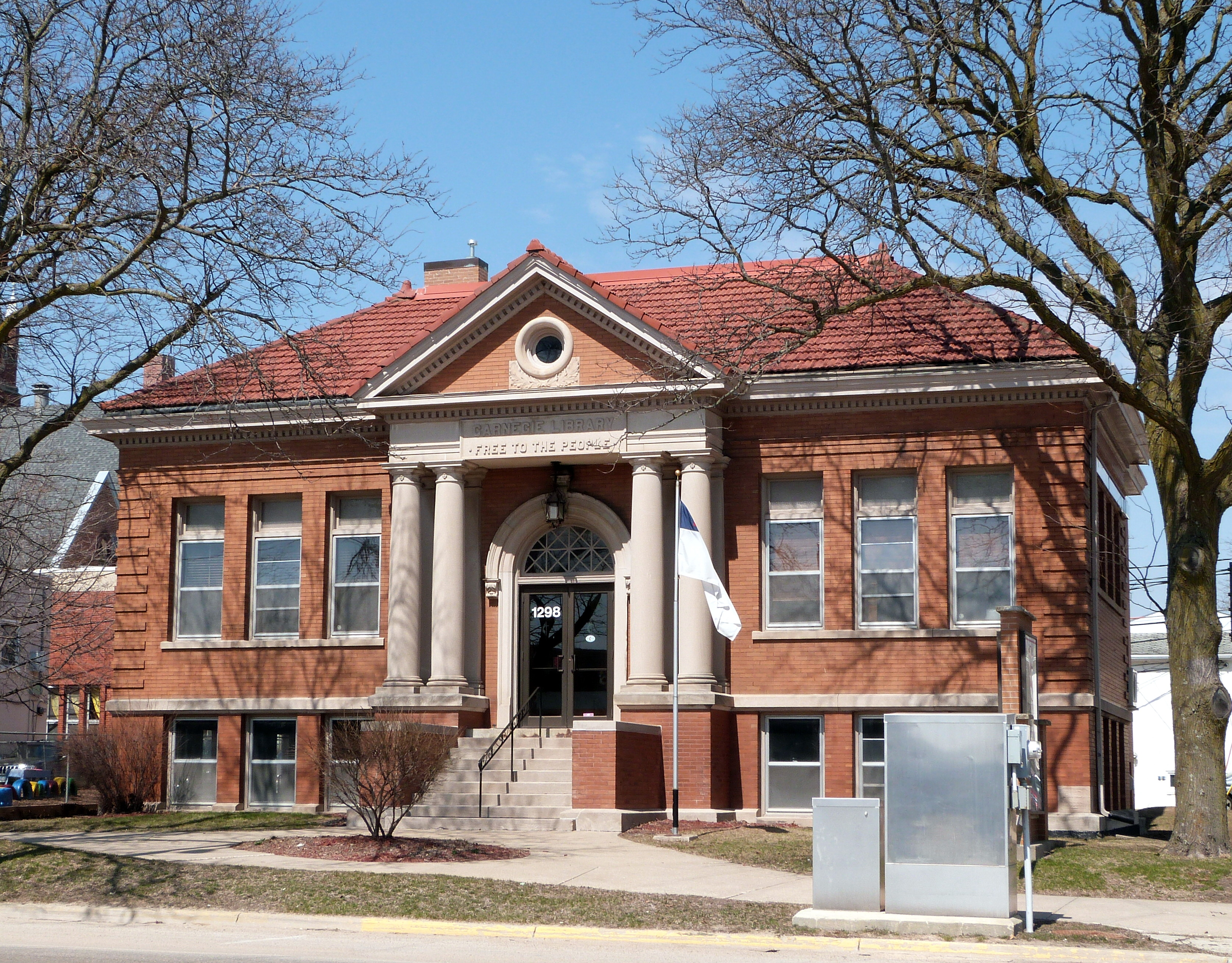

- Location within Iowa Location within the United States
- Location: 1298 7th Ave. Marion, Iowa
- Coordinates: 42°02′0.9″N 91°35′45.7″W
- Area: less than one acre
- Built: 1905
- Built by: A.H. Conner
- Architect: Dieman and Fiske
- Architectural style: Classical Revival
- Part of: Marion Commercial Historic District (ID09000930)
- NRHP reference No.: 94000260
- Added to NRHP: March 25, 1994

The Marion Carnegie Public Library is a historic building located in Marion, Iowa, United States. The Marion Federation of Women's Clubs was established in 1901 with the purpose of organizing a public library. Adeliza Daniels was the primary force behind the organization, and she contacted Andrew Carnegie to donate funds for the building. After he agreed to a grant of $11,500, the Cedar Rapids architectural firm of Dieman and Fiske designed the brick Neoclassical building. Cedar Rapids contractor A.H. Conner was responsible for construction. It is a single-story structure built over a raised basement and a proment pedimented main entrance. The new library was dedicated on March 16, 1905, and served the community in that form until 1957. In that year the auditorium in the basement was remodeled into a children's reading room. A three-story addition, which doubled the size of the building, was completed in 1961. The building was individually listed on the National Register of Historic Places in 1994. The Marion Public Library has subsequently moved to a new facility, and the Carnegie building is now part of the First United Methodist Church complex. In 2009 it was included as a contributing property in the Marion Commercial Historic District.
