= First Presbyterian Church (Marion, Iowa) =

- First Presbyterian Church of Marion, Iowa
- U.S. National Register of Historic Places
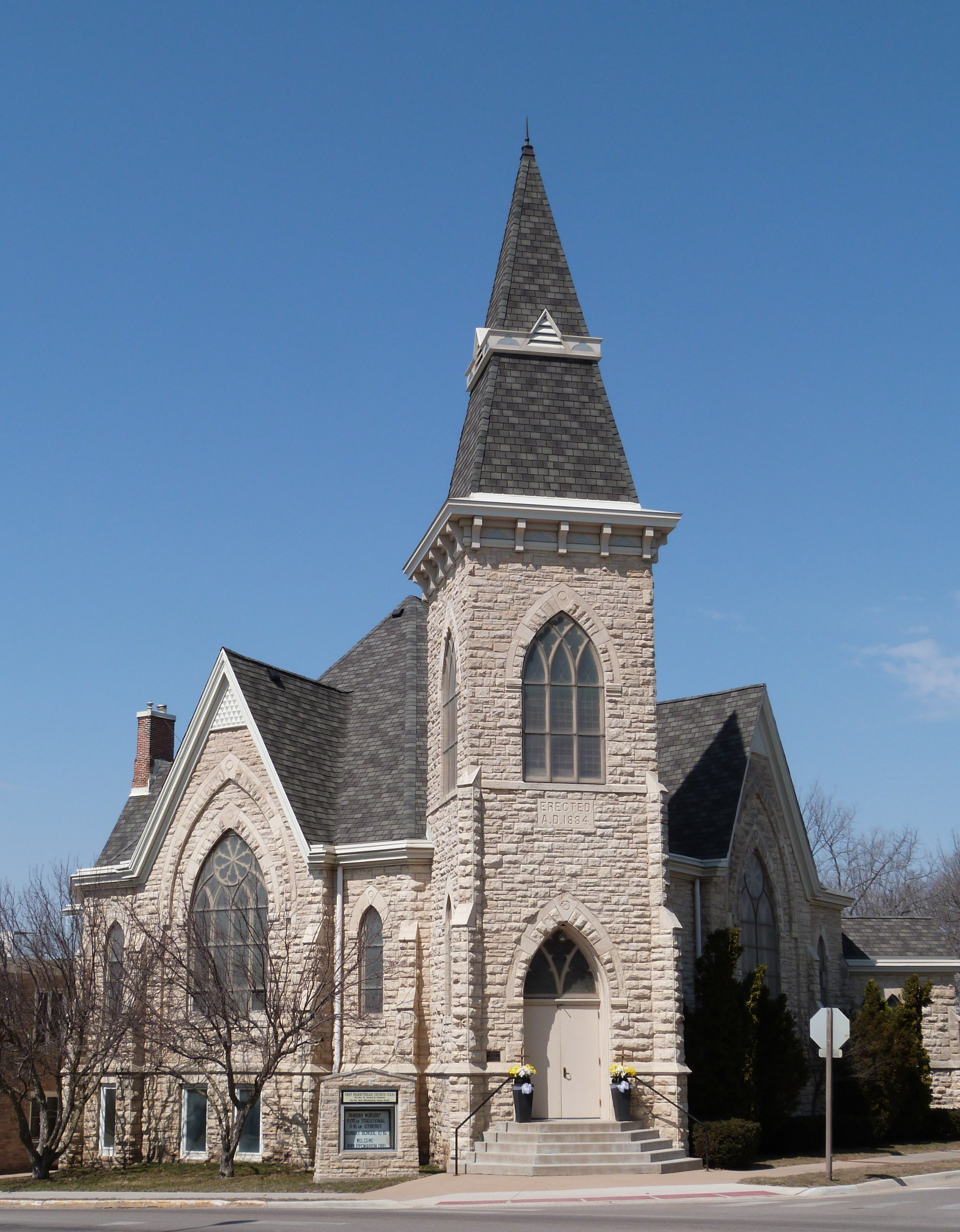
- The First Presbyterian Church in 2013.

- Location within Iowa Location within the United States
- Location: 802 12th St. Marion, Iowa
- Coordinates: 42°02′04″N 91°35′50″W
- Built: 1885
- Built by: W.W. Dawson (stonework); L.E. White (carpentry)
- Architect: Francis M. Ellis, et al.
- Architectural style: Gothic Revival
- NRHP reference No.: 92000924
- Added to NRHP: July 24, 1992

First Presbyterian Church is located in Marion, Iowa, United States. It was listed on the National Register of Historic Places in 1992.

== History ==
The church was organized on February 5, 1842. There were originally nine members, many of whom transferred their membership from the Linn Grove Presbyterian Church near Springville, Iowa. It was originally called the Old School Presbyterian Church. While that generally refers to it being conservative, it also meant in the years before the Civil War that it was anti-slavery.

Initially, the congregation met for services in public buildings, including the Linn County courthouse, which was in Marion at that time. There was no pastor in the early years. The Rev. Salmon Cowles, a Presbyterian missionary based in Keokuk, visited about four times a year. The Marion and Linn Groves churches shared the Rev. J.S. Fullerton as a pastor starting in 1849.

Property on Market Street (now Tenth Street) was purchased for $60 in 1851. It took five years to build a church building with volunteer labor. In 1852 a Sunday School was organized. At the same time, the Rev. Alexander S. Marshall began a nearly 40-year pastorate with the church. He saw that construction was finished on the church.

The congregation grew and planning for a new building was begun. Construction on the present Gothic Revival structure began in July 1884. It was designed by Marshalltown architect Francis M. Ellis. Stone for the building was hauled in from Stone City, Iowa. The church was dedicated on September 27, 1885. A unique feature of this church building in Iowa is its octagonal shape.

The Westminster House was the first major addition since the church was built, and was constructed from 1954 to 1956. A kitchen was added and a new Moller organ was purchased at the same time. A major remodeling project occurred in 1967, which included a new ceiling and new pews. A 1988 addition was built and it included a lounge, choir room, and pastor's office. The lot northwest of the church was acquired in 1989, the building on it was razed and it was made into a parking lot.

In 1997 the sanctuary was renovated with new carpet and new pew cushions. The following year the handbell choirs were established. The first part of a three-phase restoration project of the stained glass windows was completed in 1999.

In 2000 Pastor Howard Chapman served a Presbyterian church in Scotland during the summer months, and First Presbyterian hosted Scottish Pastor Eric Foggit and his family. In 2001 the second phase of the stained glass window restoration was completed and the renovation of the Westminster House chapel as a multi-purpose room as well as a chapel was completed.

== Architecture ==
A notable feature of the church building is its symmetry. It has a steeply pitched hipped roof, a square corner tower with a spire, and four large projecting gables. Large stained glass windows are located in three of those gabled elevations. The fourth gable houses the pipe organ on the interior. There are two main entryways into the building, one in the tower and one in the northeast angle. The sanctuary is an open room without columns or other dividers. Its primary decorative feature is the Gothic-style woodwork that frames the large windows and the ceiling. The pews are set at an angle so as to fill the octagonal space. The 1950s addition was built immediately adjacent to the west wall of the sanctuary.

== Social Ministry ==
Mission House was built by First Presbyterian in 1985 just north of the church. The Churches of Marion Pantry, which was begun in 1982, is located there. It is operated by nine local churches and makes food available to those in need. Also housed there is Helping Hands Storeroom, which is operated by volunteers from First Presbyterian. The Storeroom provides donated clothing, bedding, household items, and toys to those in need.
