= Ray Cheetany =

American football punter/kicker and entrepreneur

Ray Cheetany (born December 22, 1977, in Cedar Rapids, Iowa) is a former American football Punter/Kicker and an Internet entrepreneur. He is best known for creating the sports social networking site called RawTeams.com in 2010.

Following being named 2nd Team All State Kicker at Linn-Mar High School in Marion, Iowa. Cheetany took his talents to Junior College sports powerhouse Iowa Central Community College in Fort Dodge, Iowa. The same Junior College that produced Mixed Martial Arts (MMA) Stars Jon Jones and Cain Velasquez. Cheetany became a 1st Team All American NJCAA kicker at Iowa Central Community College, Cheetany moved on to the UNLV Rebels where he played for NFL and NCAA Hall of Fame Coach John Robinson (American football coach). After red-shirting during the 1998 season, Cheetany assumed the punting and kickoff duties for the Rebels and became UNLV’s Special Teams Player of the Year in both 1999 and 2000. The attitude has made the 5-11, 180 pound punter/kicker a personal favorite of John Robinson. "Ray is a great competition-guy. He is a natural athlete. If his heart was in a tailback or quarterback, he'd be a Heisman (Trophy) candidate, "John Robinson told the Las Vegas Review-Journal. He was tabbed one of the nation's top 10 special teams players by Sports Illustrated as a junior. Cheetany was named 1st Team All-American Punter by Street & Smith's Magazine and Playboy Magazine. He was also recognized as the highest graded player at his position by National Football Scouting Inc. The UNLV Rebels finished 8-5 with a win over the Arkansas Razorbacks in the Las Vegas Bowl. After his senior year Cheetany signed a contract with the Tennessee Titans. Cheetany was part of the 2011 Iowa Central Community College Athletic Hall Of Fame.
