= W. Franklin Dove =

American biologist (1897–1972)

William Franklin "Franklin" Dove (11 April 1897 – 24 March 1972) was an American biologist who was most famous for his "unicorn" experiment he conducted at the University of Maine in the early 20th century. He also performed other research projects in regard to food selection by mammals and other areas of animal reproduction and nutrient intake. Dove was a member of the faculty of the University of Maine.

== Early life and education ==
Dove was born in Marion, Iowa, on 11 April 1897. He earned his B.S. from Iowa State College, in 1922. He earned an M.S. from the University of Wisconsin–Madison in 1923, and his Ph.D. in 1927.

== Career ==
=== Dove's Unicorn Research ===
The horn of the unicorn dates back all the way to ancient times where they were sought after by kings and queens because they were believed to have magical powers as an antidote against poisons. The typical description in the mythology of a unicorn would have the head and neck and the fine-boned, graceful legs of the horse; the beard and divided hooves of the Capridae; (part of the Artiodactyla family) the tail of the oryx; and a single spike spiraling from the forehead.

The artificial production of unicorns has been suggested a number of times in the past. François Levaillant, 1776, in his "Travels to Africa," describes a process of contriving the horns of an ox. During more contemporary times has there been articles of accounts of so-called "unicorned" sheep in Nepal, and what fascinated him was the manner in which they were created. The process adopted was branding with a red-hot iron the male lambs when they are about two or three months old on their horns when they begin to sprout. The wounds are then treated with a mixture of oil and soot and when they heal, instead of growing at their usual places and spreading, they come out as on through the middle of their skull.

Although more recently has scientific scrutiny began to arise over these accounts, trying to disprove them. A majority of naturalists are inclined to say that the mere fact of searing the budding horns would not result in those appendages sprouting out at the summit of the skull instead of still sprouting out of sides as in natural horns do. However it is true that horns of a young animal might be induced to grow together by binding them together, but that would still put an unnatural strain on them and make them grow out bony and unnatural, they would not arise smooth and straight out the middle of the skull as stated in previous research.

In March 1933, an operation was performed on a day-old male Ayrshire calf. The two horns were cut placed closely together over the frontal stitches at the intersection of the lines drawn from the original horn spouts. The horn buds were trimmed flat. The frontal periosteum it was expected that the two horns would fuse together into one large horn solidly attached to the skull and located above and between the eyes. The experiment was successful, at the age of two years the two buds have formed together into one large horn molded into the forehead for support. What makes this unicorn different from the other ones is all in the horn, unlike the other unicorns the horn spike grew from the skull instead of upon. A single united sheath covers the horn spike, the horn curves slightly upward toward the tip and gracefully extends the curve of the back and neck when the animal stands at attention. Like that of a mythical unicorn described by Ctesias and Fresnel, the horn sheath is white or grayish-white at the base and is tipped with black. (Had the unicorn been a female, the horn would be tipped with red, since the color appears as a sex-limited factor in this particular breed. This Ayrshire bull, whose Scottish ancestors flourished under King James VI, who, as James I of England put the unicorn on England's coat of arms, is a true unicorn. Although it is an animal with the hereditary potentiality for two horns, he recognizes the power of a single horn which he uses as a prow to pass under fences and barriers in his path.

=== The Unibull Experiment ===
The Unibull was one of W. Franklin Dove's more well known experiments. In this experiment he theorized that the horns didn't grow from the skull but grew into the skull over time from horn buds. In order to test his hypothesis he conducted his experiments on many animals like sheep, cows, and goats, as well as the famous Unibull.

W. Franklin Dove acknowledged that horns don't actually grow from the skull, but instead, they are actually unattached bits of tissue that eventually root their way into the skull. He also did more in-depth research about horns and learned that people before him have been creating "unicorn" animals. For example, some sheep were made into single horned sheep by branding two- or three-month-old lambs on their horn buds and then treating them with a mixture of oil and soot while they were healing so that the horns grew from the middle of the skull. So, Dove reasoned that the positioning of the horns is quite open to natural or artificial variation which would mean that "unicorns" were not a total contradiction of the laws of nature. To test his theory, he took a day old calf and surgically removed its horn buds and cut them so that they would fit together, and then implanted them in the center of the calf's head. The circular horn buds were trimmed flat at their point of contact so as to provide a larger fusion surface. It was expected that the two horn buds would fuse together to form one large horn solidly attached to the skull and located somewhat between the eyes to mimic the horn of the unicorn. The experiment was proven to be successful as the bull grew the horn buds fused together and started to form a single, straight horn about a foot in length. The horn functioned very well for the bull, perhaps even better than the normal horns the bulls have. The bull eventually became the leader of its herd and was rarely challenged. An interesting side effect of this horn was the bulls abnormally docile personality. He also created "unicorns" out of goats as well as cows. Besides making "unicorns" he also made tri-horned animals.

=== Other research ===
One of Dove's published research articles, "Developing Food Acceptance Research", discusses many aspects of the necessity of developing new methods of food research and the relation to food acceptance among individuals. The article was written shortly after World War II and the purpose was to examine the causes of food nonacceptance. In order to discuss the topic, Dove refers to the unconscious acceptance 'panels' that families held during their meal times. Some of the factors behavioral factors that influence the acceptance of food include: imitation (when a child imitates those choices of their parents), domination (punishment through taking or privileging food), urging (encouragement to eat food for health advantages), and resistance (refusing to partake in foods that are presented). Other areas of consideration for food acceptance included all physical attributes like odor, texture, and flavor; the volume of food presented; the quality of the soil the food was grown on; the manner in which food is stored, as well as the quality of that storage. From all of these, the agriculture of the time was formed.

Dove states that the awareness of food acceptance is brought forth with the change to commercial farming where the best product comes from quantity. Home-grown foods were replaced with standardized products. The requirement for processed foods increased when the armies of WWII began to grow. Dove says that the missing link that has not been studied is food acceptability between the consumer and the food. He also states that many specialized areas need to be studied in regard to food acceptability, including: grading of food quality, quality control, chemists to study treated foods and biologists to study relativity between food gathering and hunger.

The ultimate conclusion of Dove's research was that attitudes related to food acceptance were due to habits of choosing food made from birth to adulthood, and other factors including climate and socioeconomics and religious characteristics of each region.

Another research project Dove conducting involved the relationship between sterility and the copulatory organ in poultry in his article, "Sex Sterility and the Diminutive Copulatory Organ in Domestic Fowl." Cloacas were examined in White Leghorns for a diminutive copulatory organ. Out of 78 individuals, 4 were discovered to be lacking this organ and 3 of the 4 were found to be sterile or have abnormal reproductive results. One of these four had perished and during the necropsy was found to have abnormally small testicles (one-fourth the normal size). The second cockerel was allowed the opportunity to reproduce with twelve female individuals for thirteen days and was unsuccessful in fertilizing any eggs. Of the remaining two, one fertilized a minute portion of an egg sample and the other fertilized practically all eggs of a sample of 24.

It was determined that a type of sterility can be assumed by examination of the cloaca before placing a male into a mating pen. However, the inability to locate the gland does not always mean it is nonexistent – it could just be smaller in size. In this experiment, there was no relation in regard to the size of the gland and the fertility of the cockerel. There were some exceptions in the experiment that Dove writes could have been due to late development of the gonads in comparison to the opposite sex's.

== Personal life ==
Dove married Ruth Rebecca Stone (1908–1983) on 5 September 1933, in Montgomery, Alabama. He died on 24 March 1972 in Oak Park, Illinois.
