= Catamount Recording Studio =

Professional music recording studio in Iowa

Catamount Recording Studio is a professional music recording studio in Cedar Falls, Iowa. Tom Tatman, Rick Bisbey and Bill Barker established the studio as a rehearsal and recording space for their band, Headstone. In 1980 the studio opened to the public and has since worked with many national bands including American rock band Stone Sour. Tatman serves as the studio's producer and chief engineer. Catamount Recording Studio exclusively records musicians and albums.

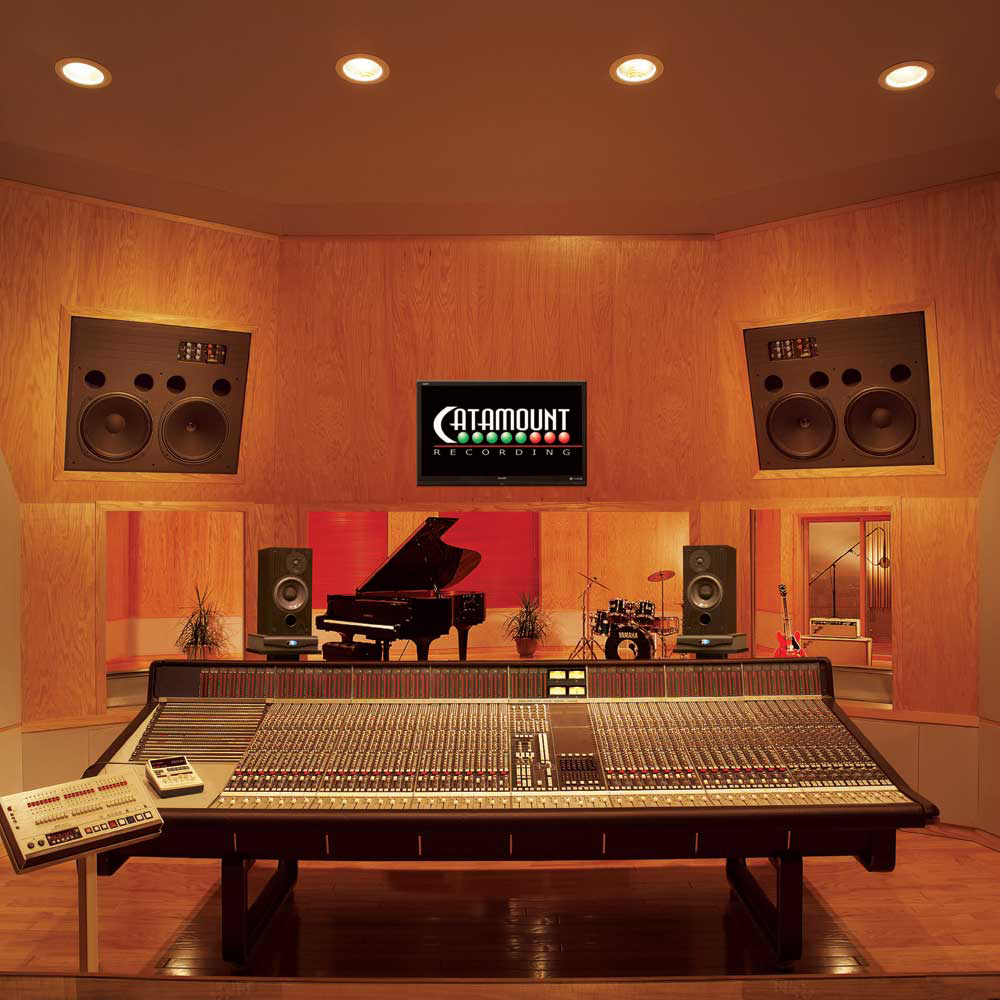
Catamount Studios, Cedar Falls, Iowa

== History ==
Tom Tatman, Rick Bisbey and Bill Barker founded Catamount Recording Studio as a rehearsal and recording space for their band, Headstone. In 1980, the band broke up and the studio was opened to the public. In 1994, Kansas City's New Times publication named Tom Tatman and Catamount Recording Studio the "best area producer and studio."

Catamount Recording Studio relocated to a larger facility designed by Carl Yanchar in Cedar Falls, Iowa in February 2002. Yanchar has designed recording studios including The Plant, Mad Hatter, Lion Share, CBS Studios and Capitol Recording Studios. Stone Sour was one of Catamount Recording Studio's first clients to record an album at the new studio. That album yielded three hit singles, two Grammy Award nominations and a gold record.

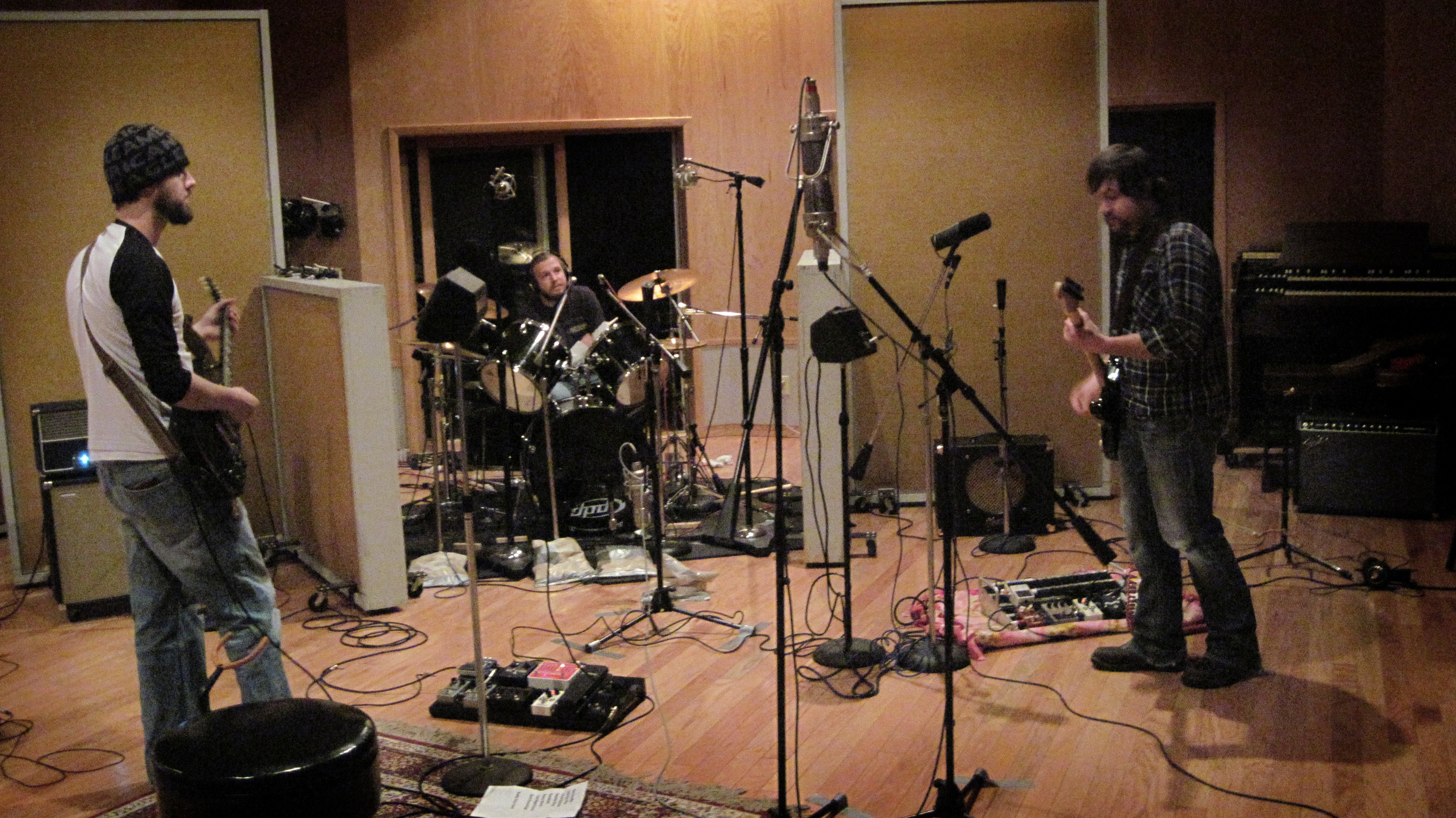
Catamount Studio

Thirty-six nationally distributed albums have been recorded and mixed at the recording studio. In 2015, Catamount Recording Studio was inducted into the Iowa Rock 'n' Roll Hall of Fame.
