= Glenn O. and Lucy O. Pyle House =

Historic house in Iowa, United States

- U.S. National Register of Historic Places
- U.S. Historic district – Contributing property
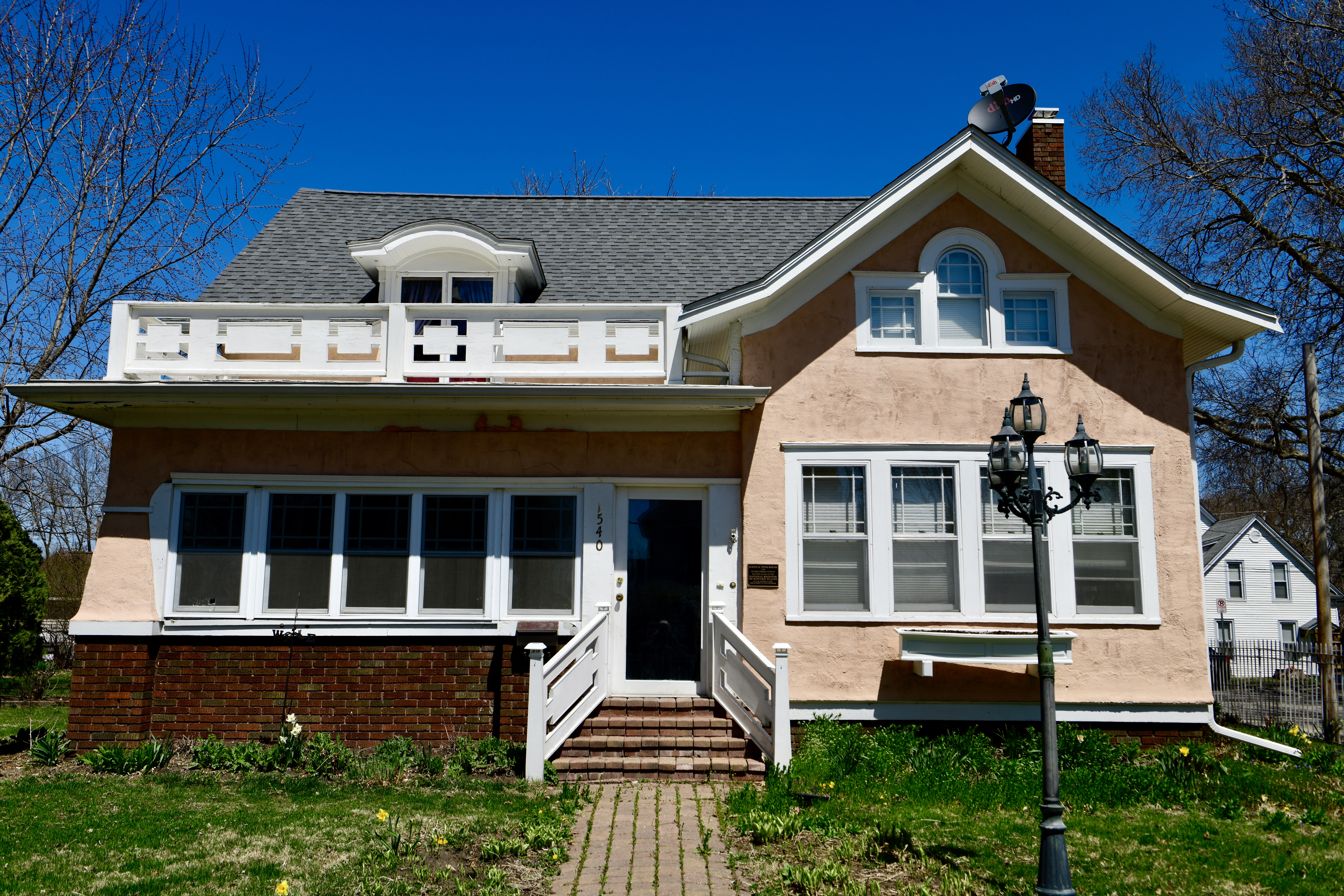

- Location within Iowa Location within the United States
- Location: 1540 8th Ave. Marion, Iowa
- Coordinates: 42°02′03.9″N 91°35′36.7″W
- Area: less than one acre
- Built: 1924
- Built by: Glenn O. Pyle
- Architectural style: Bungalow/Craftsman; Colonial Revival
- Part of: Pucker Street Historic District (ID02001013)
- NRHP reference No.: 02001016
- Added to NRHP: September 14, 2002

The Glenn O. and Lucy O. Pyle House is a historic building located in Marion, Iowa, United States. Pyle, who was involved in his family's lumberyard, built this 1½-story bungalow in 1924 for his family home. They moved here from a house on 14th Street that he also built. Both houses are located in a neighborhood where the community's more prominent citizens built their homes in the late 19th and early 20th centuries. They sold this property in 1933 after they had relocated to Hollywood, Florida. The house features decorative elements from both of the Craftsman and Colonial Revival styles. While it is thought that this is a patternbook or catalog house, there appear to be several custom details that suggests Pyle may have designed elements of this house himself. It is also the largest of the three houses in Marion attributed to him. The house was individually listed on the National Register of Historic Places in 2002. At the same time it was included as a contributing property in the Pucker Street Historic District.
