= John L. Grindell =

American businessman, historian, and politician

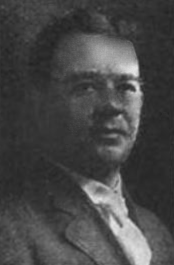

Member of the Wisconsin State Assembly
- In office 1919

Personal details
- Born: John Leroy Grindell; June 5, 1882 Marion, Iowa, US
- Died: April 18, 1948 (aged 65) Platteville, Wisconsin, US
- Party: Republican
- Occupation: Businessman, historian, politician

John Leroy "Roy" Grindell (June 5, 1882 – April 18, 1948) was an American businessman, historian, and politician.

== Biography ==
Born in Marion, Iowa, Grindell lived in Platteville, Wisconsin. He graduated from the University of Wisconsin in 1905. Grindell was principal of several schools in Wisconsin. In 1908, Grindell was involved with the John H. Grindell & Company, a retail marble and granite business, in Platteville, Wisconsin. Grindell was curator of the Wisconsin Historical Society and collected museum specimens and historical items. He was also the executive director of the Grant County Historical Society. In 1919, Grindell served in the Wisconsin State Assembly and was a Republican. He was instrumental in having the bathroom in the capitol building renovated. Grindell died suddenly at his home in Platteville, Wisconsin.
