= Joshua Pyle House and Wagon Barn =

- U.S. National Register of Historic Places
- Location within Delaware Location within the United States
- Location: 2603 Foulk Rd., Brandywine Hundred, near Wilmington, Delaware
- Coordinates: 39.82919°N 75.50014°W
- Area: 0.4 acres (0.16 ha)
- Architectural style: Double Pile Bank House
- NRHP reference No.: 93000887
- Added to NRHP: September 13, 1993

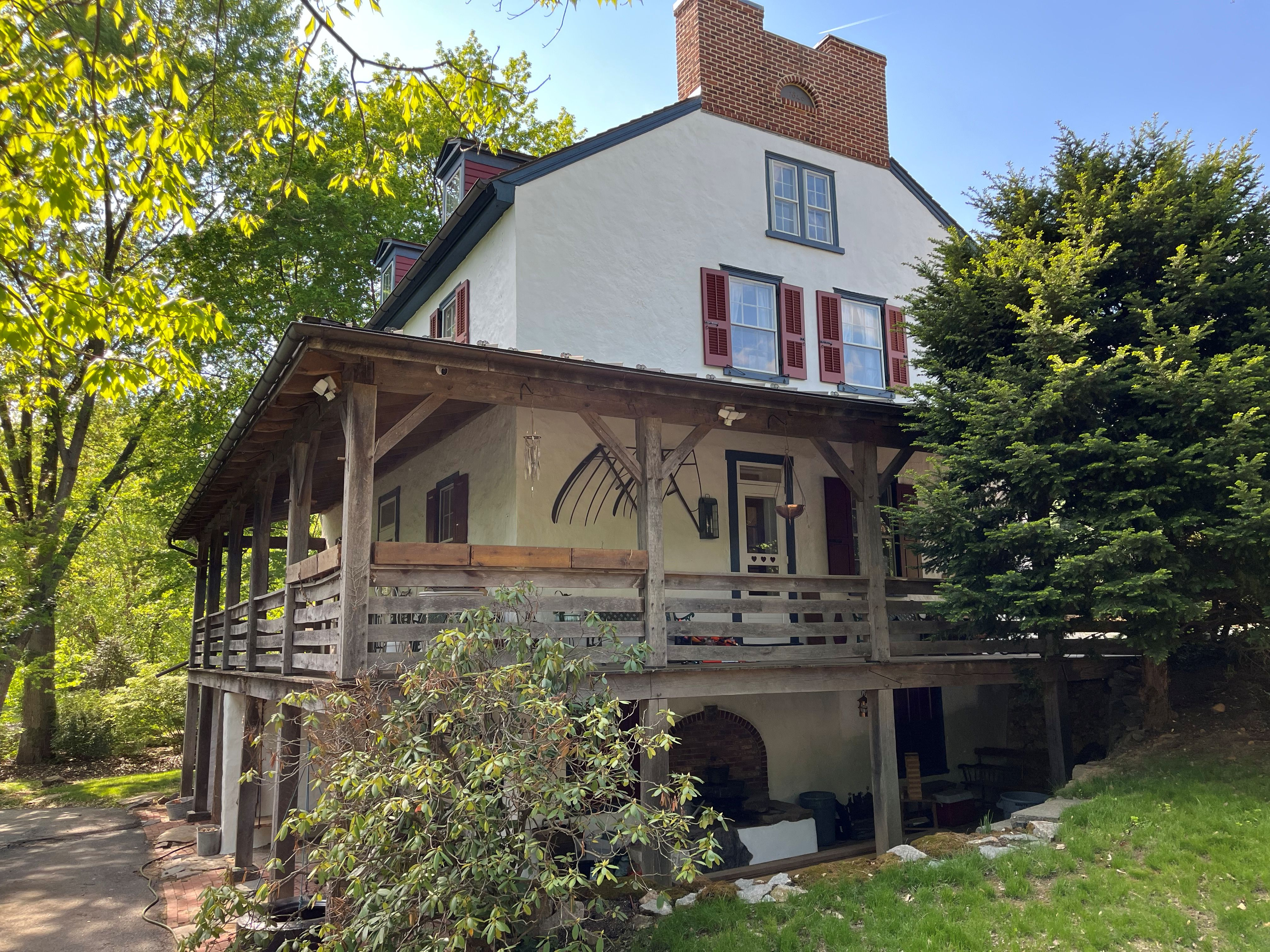
Joshua Pyle House, May 2025

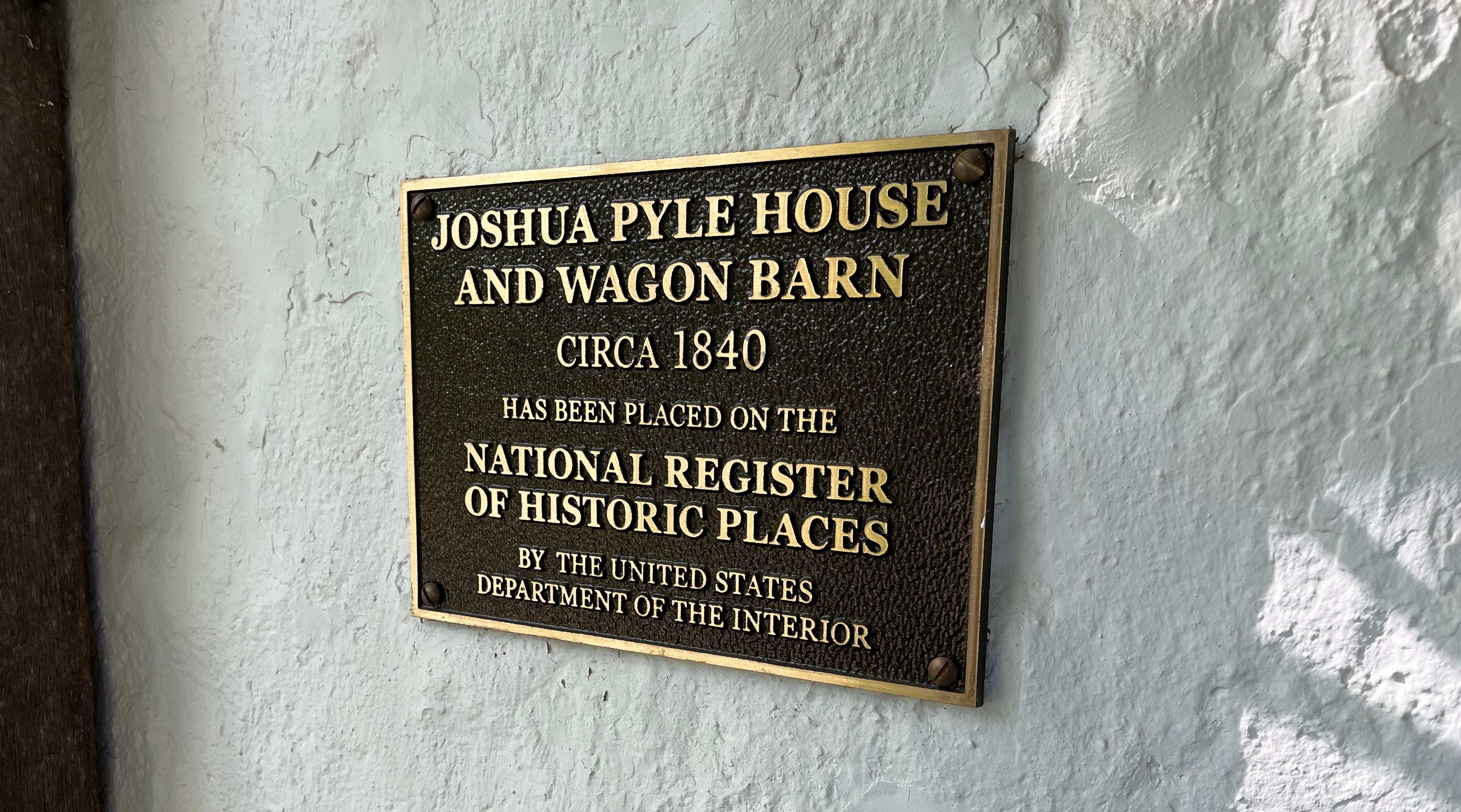

Joshua Pyle House and Wagon Barn, also known as the Warren P. Missimer House, is a historic home located near Wilmington, New Castle County, Delaware, United States. The house was built about 1840, and a stone, two-story, three-bay, center hall, double-pile plan with its original basement kitchen intact. It features a wraparound porch added about 1900 and a gable roof with dormers. The wagon barn is a bi-level, stone building with a wagon entrance at ground level.

It was added to the National Register of Historic Places in 1993.
