= Pucker Street Historic District =

Historic district in Iowa, United States

- U.S. National Register of Historic Places
- U.S. Historic district
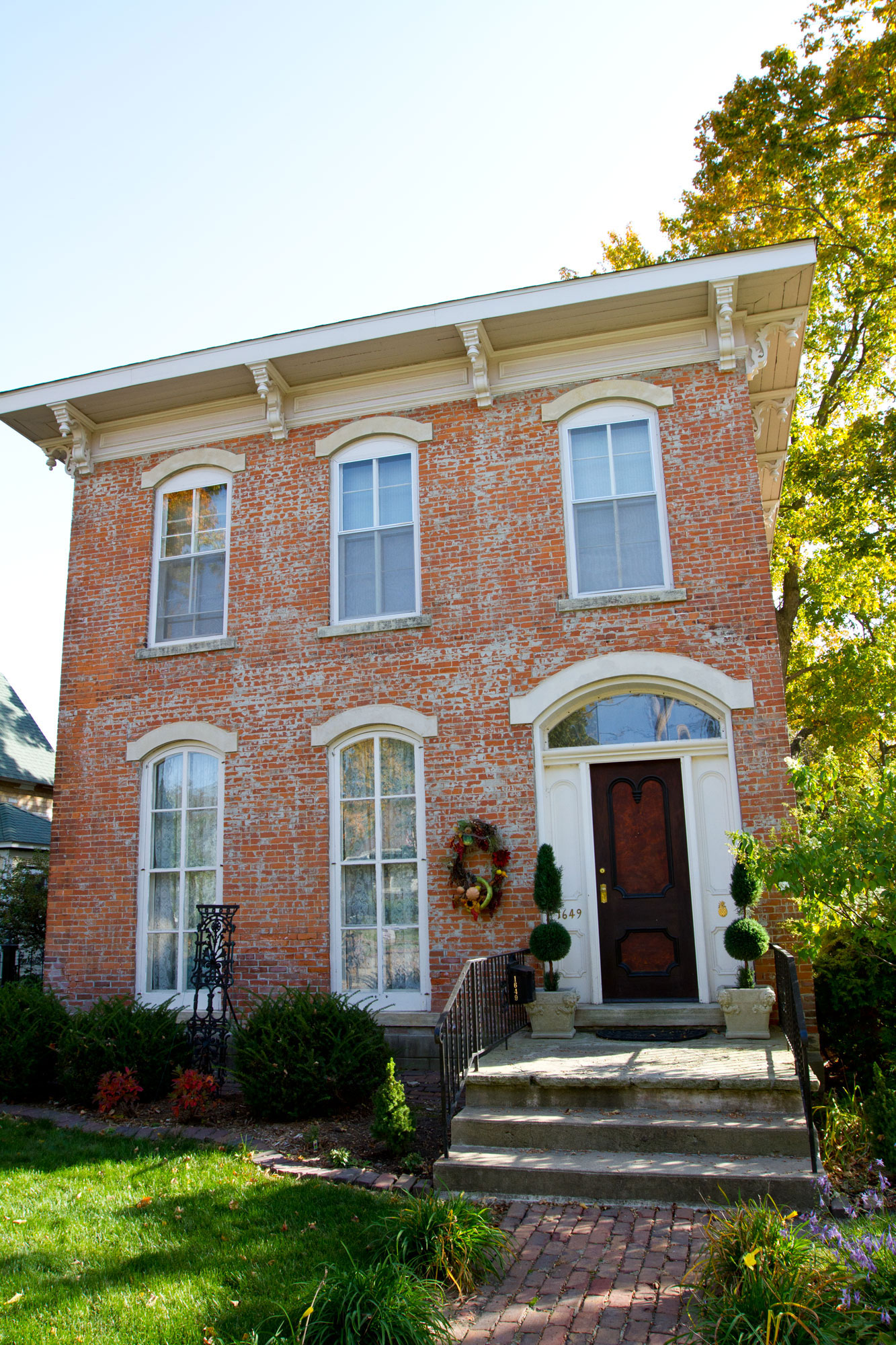
- Cardell House (1866)

- Location within Iowa Location within the United States
- Location: Bounded by 13th St., 9th Ave., 20th St., and 8th Ave., Marion, Iowa
- Coordinates: 42°02′03″N 91°35′34″W
- Area: 13 acres (5.3 ha)
- Architectural style: Italianate; Queen Anne
- NRHP reference No.: 02001013
- Added to NRHP: September 14, 2002

The Pucker Street Historic District is a nationally recognized historic district located in Marion, Iowa, United States. It was listed on the National Register of Historic Places in 2002. At the time of its nomination it consisted of 84 resources, which included 50 contributing buildings, three contributing structures, two contributing objects, and 29 non-contributing buildings. The historic district is a residential area near Marion's central business district. The people who initially built homes here were the city's pioneer families and then their descendants. It is also where the city's wealthy and influential citizens built their houses along Eighth Avenue and its adjacent streets. The neighborhood was called "Pucker Street" because of the superior attitudes that some of its early residents were said to have possessed.

Marion was established as one of the first towns in Linn County in 1839, and it served as its first county seat until 1919. Its early development came about because of its status. There were three building booms in this neighborhood: a small one in the 1850s and the 1860s, a major one in the 1880s and 1890s, and a period of infill construction and remodeling from the 1910s to the 1930s. It was fully developed by the 1940s and has not seen significant construction in subsequent years. Because of the prominence of its residents, the popular architectural styles of the era are found here, especially the Italianate and Queen Anne. The primary buildings are houses while the secondary buildings are carriage houses and garages. Three retaining walls are the contributing structures and two mounting blocks are the contributing objects. Three houses are individually listed on the National Register of Historic Places: the Samuel M. Lane House (1868), the James W. and Ida G. Bowman House (1910), and the Glenn O. and Lucy O. Pyle House (1924).
