= Marion Commercial Historic District =

Historic district in Iowa, United States

- U.S. National Register of Historic Places
- U.S. Historic district
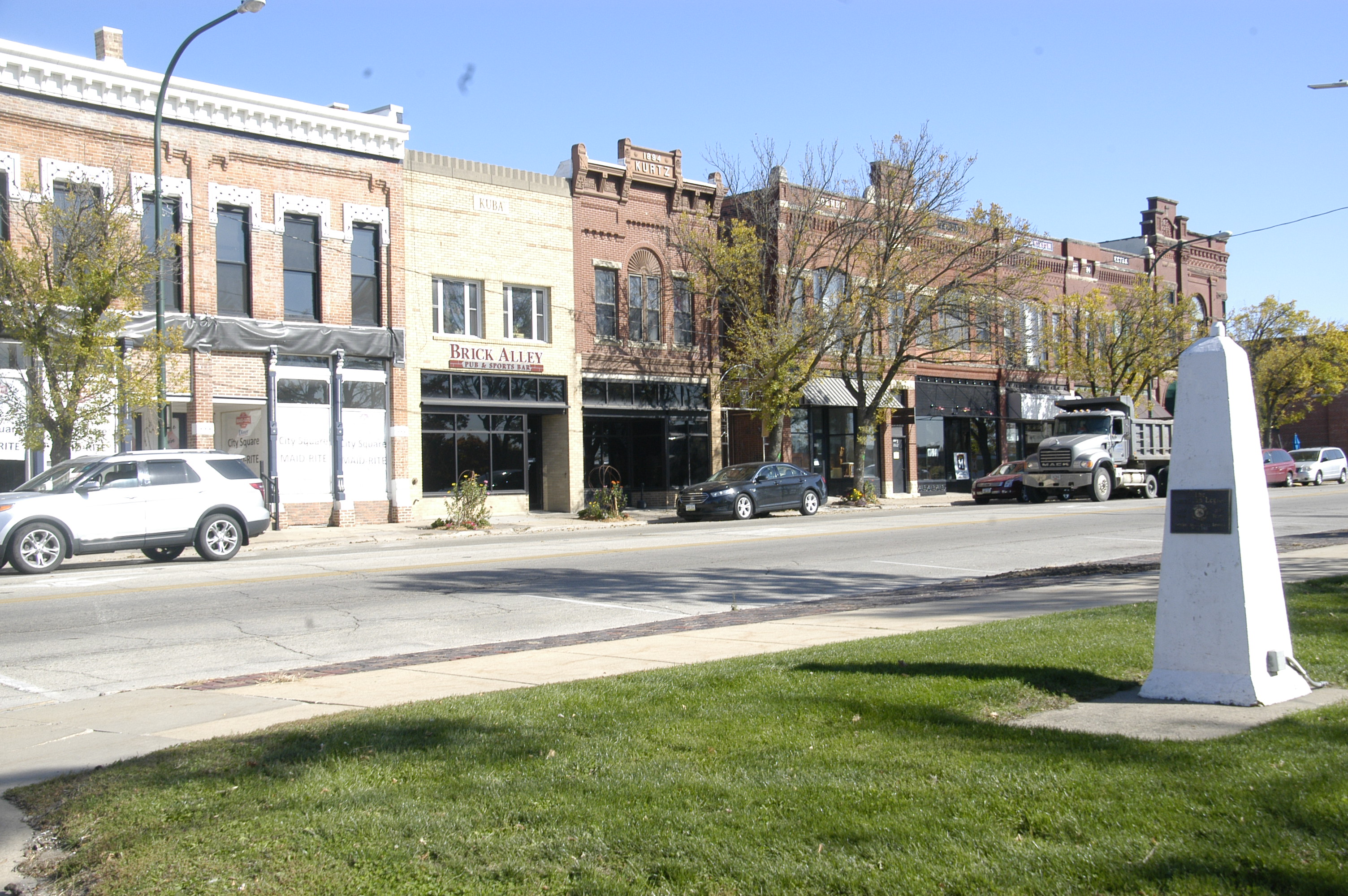
- Buildings along Seventh Avenue

- Location within Iowa Location within the United States
- Location: 560-748 10th St., 958-1298 7th Ave., 760-96 11th St., 766-76 13th St., 1108 8th Ave., and 969 6th Ave., Marion, Iowa
- Coordinates: 42°02′00.1″N 91°35′57.5″W
- Area: 11 acres (4.5 ha)
- Built by: Amos H. Connor
- Architect: Charles A. Dieman
- Architectural style: Greek Revival; Late Victorian
- MPS: Iowa's Main Street Commercial Architecture MPS
- NRHP reference No.: 09000930
- Added to NRHP: November 18, 2009

The Marion Commercial Historic District is a nationally recognized historic district located in Marion, Iowa, United States. It was listed on the National Register of Historic Places in 2009. At the time of its nomination it consisted of 41 resources, which included 29 contributing buildings, one contributing site, one contributing structure, two contributing objects, and eight non-contributing buildings. The historic district covers the city's central business district. The development of this area largely occurred when Marion was the county seat of Linn County (1838-1919). There are no county government buildings extant from this era. The city was also a division point for the Chicago, Milwaukee, St. Paul and Pacific Railroad in the late nineteenth and early twentieth centuries.

The period of significance is from 1855, when the oldest building in the district was built, to 1957 when the area had reached the culmination of its development. Fires in 1894 and 1895 destroyed a number of buildings, and they were replaced by more stylish commercial buildings. Commercial blocks in styles popular in Late Victorian era are dominant here. Most of the buildings in the district housed commercial operations, but it also includes three houses and two churches. Also located here is the former Marion Carnegie Public Library (1905), which is individually listed on the National Register of Historic Places. City Square Park is the contributing site. It was established in 1839, and the county courthouse was located across Sixth Avenue where the public library is now located. The Soldiers' and Sailors' Monument (1914) and the Cannon Monument, both located in the park, are the contributing objects. Tenth Street between Fifth and Seventh Avenues was paved with bricks in the late nineteenth century, and it is the contributing structure. Remnants of the historic train station that was torn down in 1988 were used to create a shelter house in City Square Park. It is one of the non-contributing buildings.

== See also ==
Media related to Marion Commercial Historic District at Wikimedia Commons

- Marion station (Iowa)
