= Iowa Rock 'n' Roll Hall of Fame =

Coordinates: 43.3656°N 95.1368°W

The Iowa Rock 'n' Roll Hall of Fame is a museum located in Arnolds Park, Iowa, and maintained by the non-profit Iowa Rock 'n' Roll Music Association (Iowa Rock). The mission of Iowa Rock is "Honoring achievements, educating youth and inspiring artists." Established in 1997, Iowa Rock inducts members into the Hall of Fame annually in one or more of these categories: Artists, Establishments, Establishment Owners, Media Personalities, Songwriters, Record Companies, Managers, and Agencies. The museum was opened in 2003. Notable inductees include Chase, Billy Dale Fries, The Big Bopper, Buddy Holly, Ritchie Valens and The Everly Brothers.

== History ==
The Iowa Rock 'n Roll Music Association was founded in 1997 as the first state non-profit music association dedicated to rock 'n' roll of significance to the state. Inductions to the Hall of Fame began that year, with five bands, two ballrooms, and a radio station making up the inaugural class. In 2003, it became the first state music association to have a free-standing museum.

== Inductees ==
=== Artists and bands ===
With the majority of the acts focused on those that have reached the 25 years since they were formed, inductees include both Iowa-based acts such as the Velaires and regional and national acts of significant importance to the Iowa rock 'n' roll scene such as those that perished near Clear Lake, Iowa, during the Winter Dance Party Tour on February 3, 1959.

=== Ballrooms and venues ===
Recognizing the significance of venues such as the Surf Ballroom to rock 'n' roll history, they are accorded their own category in the Hall of Fame.

=== Other industry categories ===
Making up the record industry and the distribution and marketing of early rock 'n' roll, the Hall of Fame has separate categories for:

- Booking agents/promoters
- Composers
- Deejays
- Managers
- Media representatives
- Music stores
- Radio stations
- Record stores
- Record labels
- Recording studios
- Inventors
- Venue managers
- Venue owners
- Writers
- Support People

=== Other categories ===
- Iowa Rock 'n Roll Music Association Lifetime Achievement Award
- Matousek Family Lifetime Achievement Award
- Members
- Spirit Award
- John Senn Legacy Award
- Other

== Museum ==
The museum "provides visitors with an in-depth look at Iowa’s rockin' roots through informative exhibits". It contains memorabilia from many of the inductees represented. It is open every day from Memorial Day to Labor Day and two days a week otherwise. Tours are available. In 2013, it was announced that a new 12,000 ft^{2} facility was being developed to house the museum.

== See also ==
- List of music museums
