= Marion, Iowa =

- City
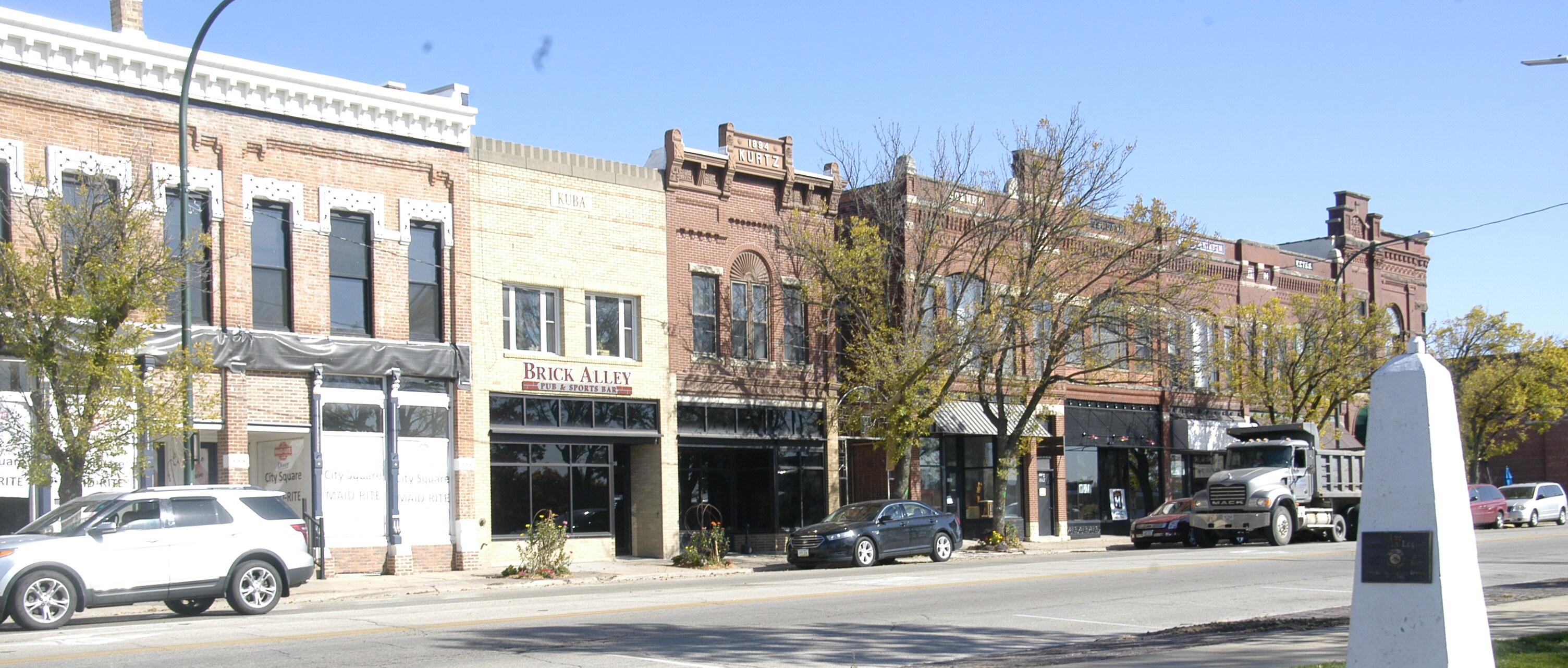
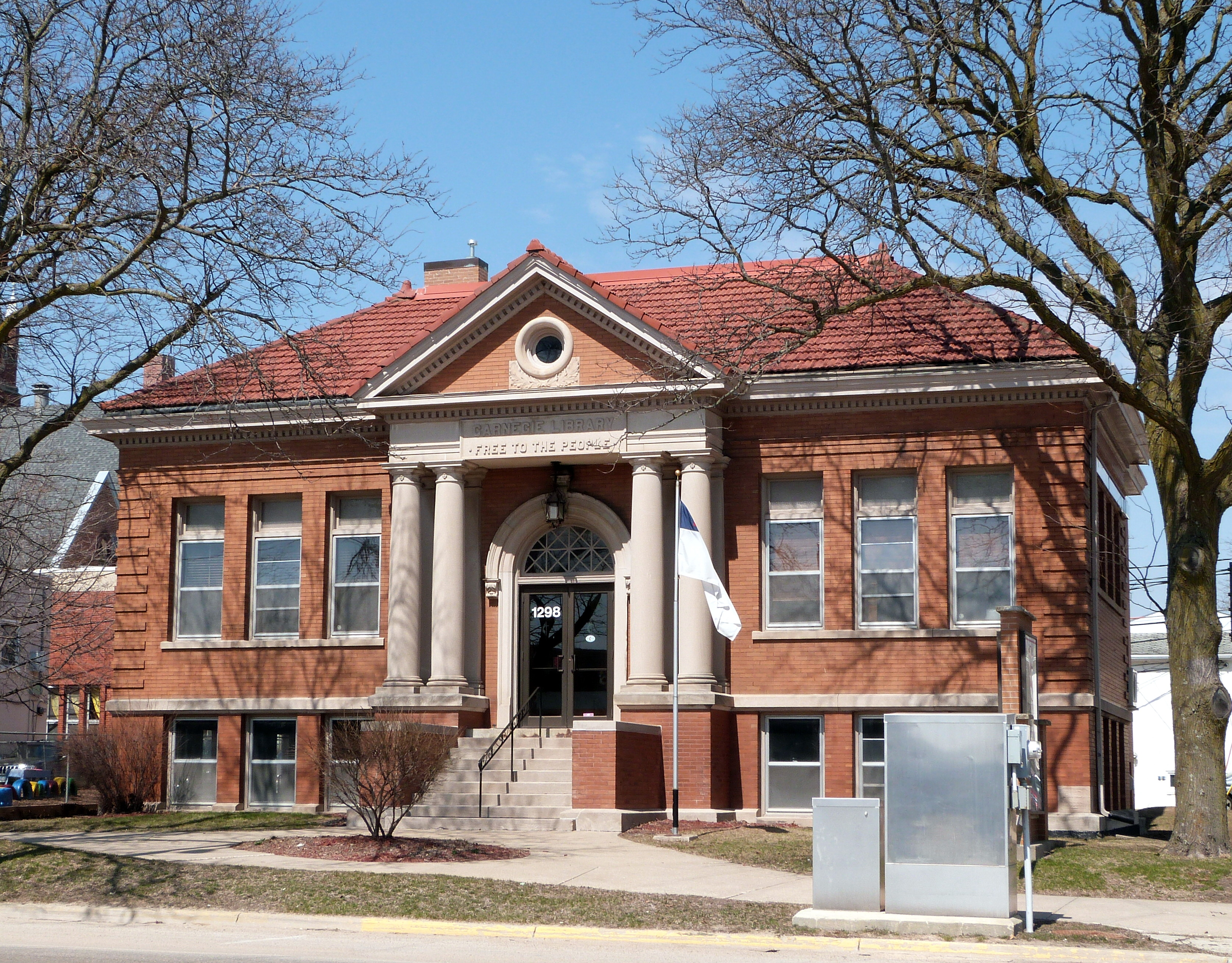
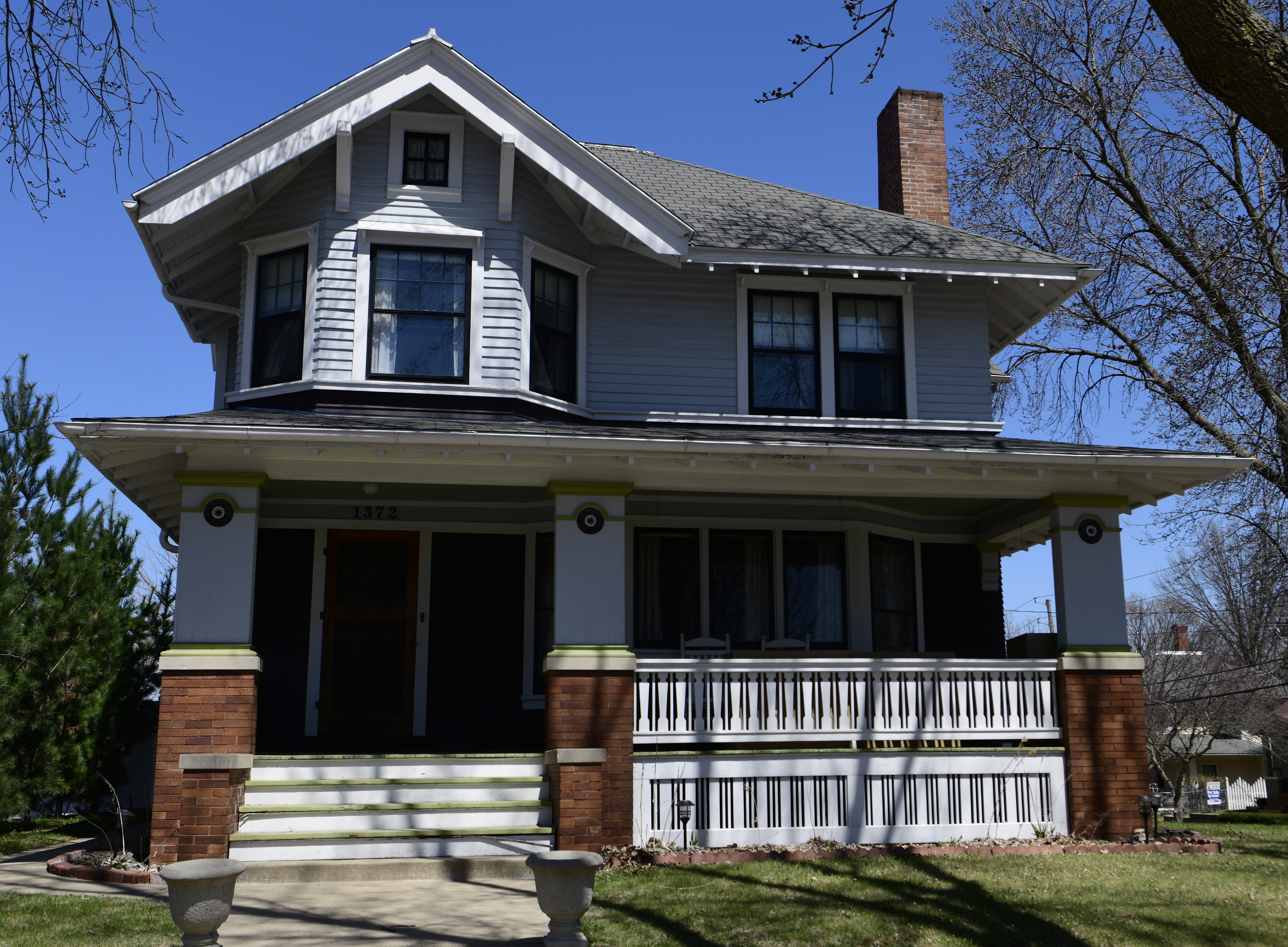
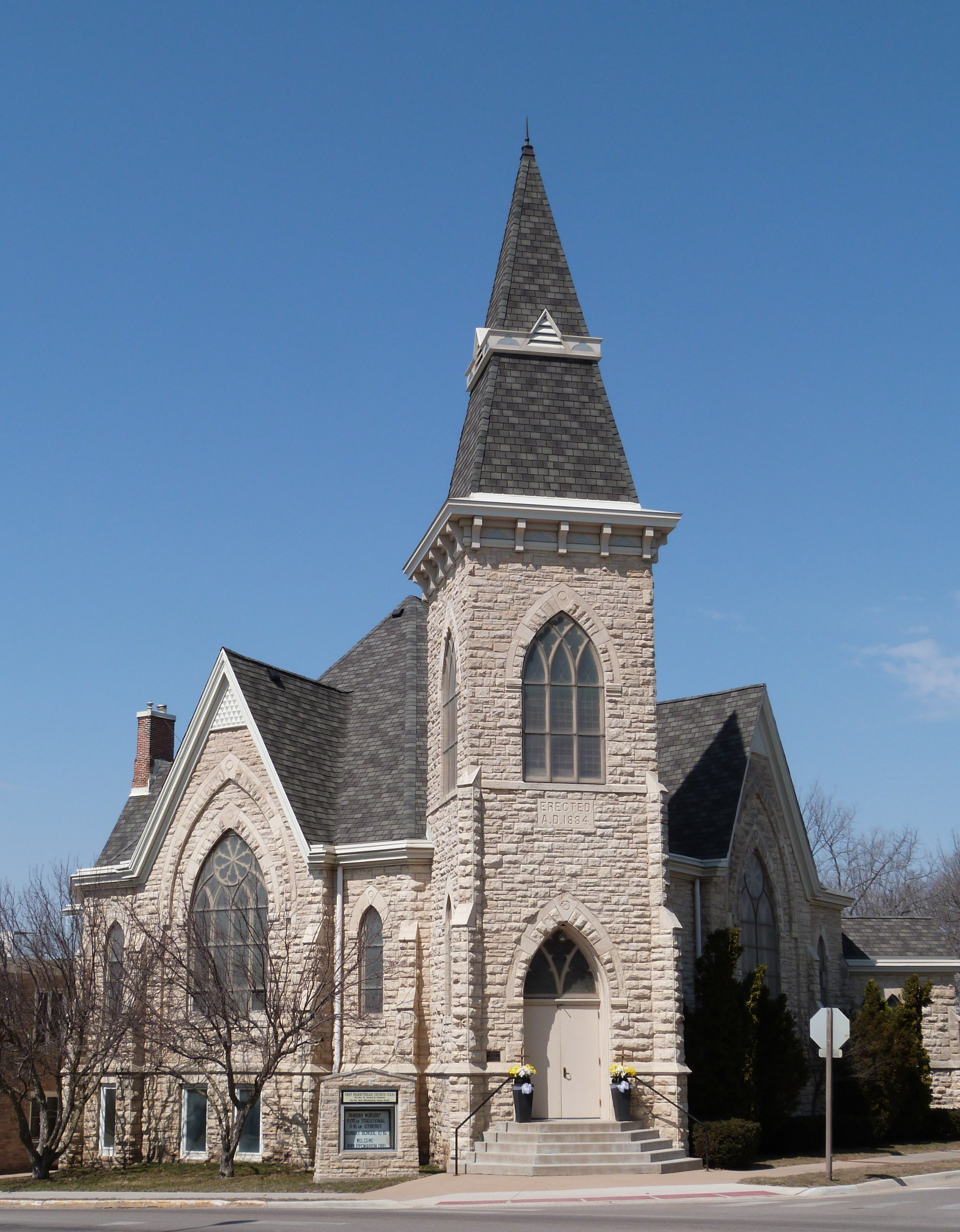
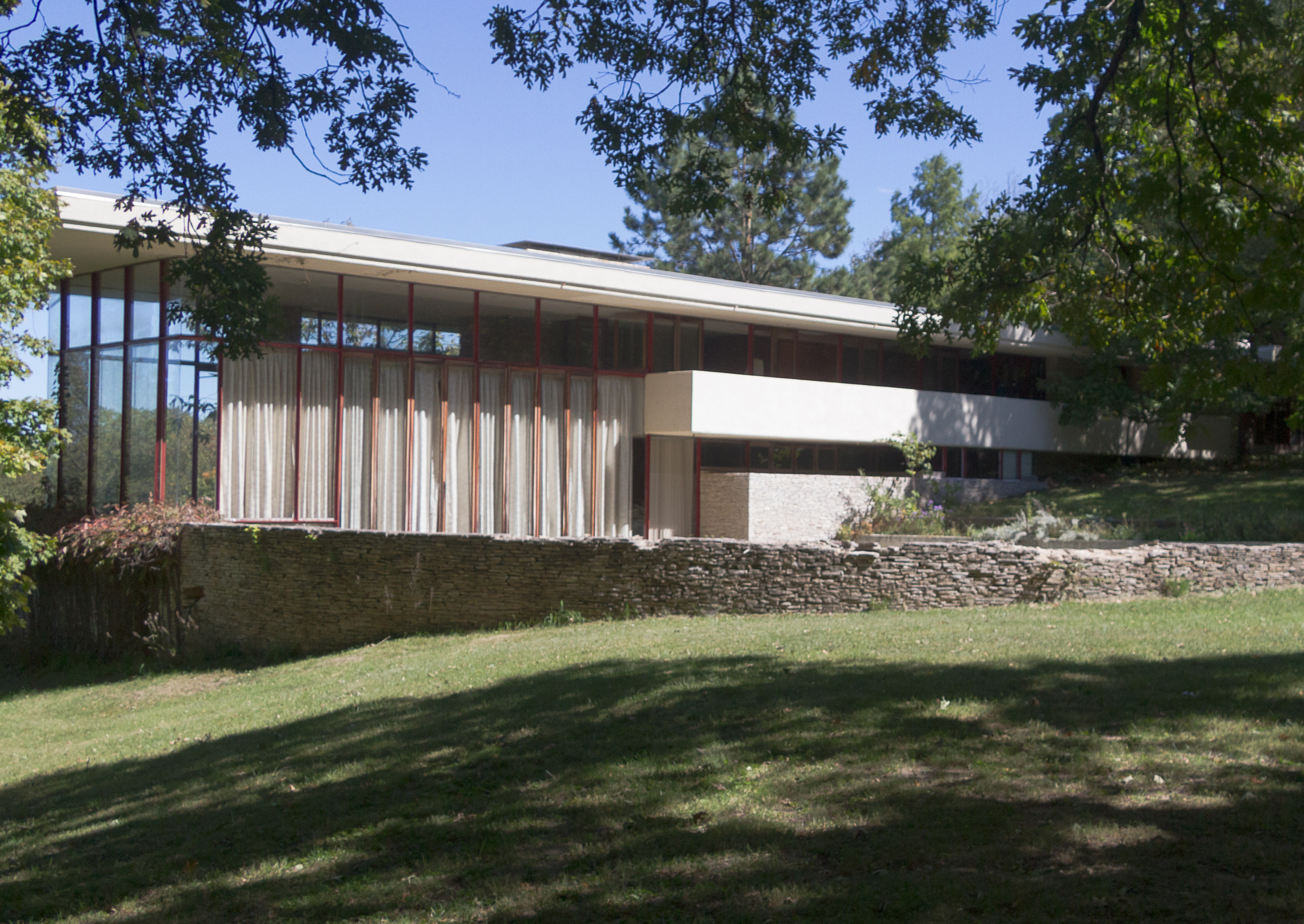
- Downtown Marion Marion Carnegie Public Library Pucker Street Historic District First Presbyterian Church Douglas and Charlotte Grant House

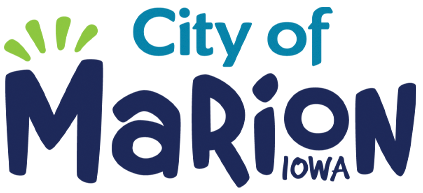
- Logo

- Location in the State of Iowa

- Location in the United States
- Coordinates: 42°02′25″N 91°36′20″W
- Country: United States
- State: Iowa
- County: Linn
- Incorporated: 1837

Government
  - Mayor: Nicolas AbouAssaly

Area
  - Total: 17.81 sq mi (46.12 km^{2})
  - Land: 17.80 sq mi (46.11 km^{2})
  - Water: 0.0039 sq mi (0.01 km^{2})
- Elevation: 840 ft (260 m)

Population (2020)
  - Total: 41,535
  - Rank: 14th in Iowa
  - Density: 2,333.2/sq mi (900.85/km^{2})
- Time zone: UTC−6 (CST)
  - Summer (DST): UTC−5 (CDT)
- ZIP Code: 52302
- Area code: 319
- FIPS code: 19-49485
- GNIS feature ID: 2395011
- Website: www.cityofmarion.org

Marion is a city in Linn County, Iowa, United States. The population was 26,294 at the 2000 census and was 41,535 in 2020, an increase of 58%. The city is located next to Cedar Rapids and part of the Cedar Rapids Metropolitan Statistical Area. Marion was designated as the first Linn County seat before it was moved to the larger neighbor Cedar Rapids in 1919. Marion is primarily a suburban community with a historic downtown center, and is one of the fastest-growing cities in Iowa.

== History ==
The town was named after Francis Marion, a hero of the Revolutionary War. The site was selected in 1839 to be the first county seat of the newly organized Linn County. After years of debate over moving the county seat to Cedar Rapids, it was put to a vote in 1919. The vote was 9,960 in favor of moving the seat and 4,823 against the move.

The Indian Creek Country Club was once the home of a sulky horse racing track.

The town was the home to St. Berchman's Seminary, established in 1905 by the Sisters of Mercy as a boarding school for small boys. The academy, which closed in 1942, consisted of five buildings spread over 23 acres. One of the most famous residents was actor Don Ameche, who lived in the facility as a boy; he went on to star in the movie Cocoon. The main building, consisting of housing apartments, is all that remains.

In 2023, Mayor Nicholas AbouAssaly was re-elected for another term, unopposed. AbouAssaly is, as of 2025, serving his third term, after winning the 2019 and 2015 elections in a landslide.

== Geography ==
According to the United States Census Bureau, the city has a total area of 16.06 square miles (41.60 km^{2}), of which 16.05 square miles (41.57 km^{2}) is land and 0.01 square miles (0.03 km^{2}) is water.

=== Climate ===
Climate data for Marion, Iowa (1991–2020 normals, extremes 1892–present)
Month	Jan	Feb	Mar	Apr	May	Jun	Jul	Aug	Sep	Oct	Nov	Dec	Year
Record high °F (°C)	68 (20)	76 (24)	88 (31)	94 (34)	104 (40)	103 (39)	110 (43)	108 (42)	105 (41)	94 (34)	80 (27)	69 (21)	110 (43)
Mean daily maximum °F (°C)	30.0 (−1.1)	35.1 (1.7)	48.9 (9.4)	63.3 (17.4)	73.8 (23.2)	82.3 (27.9)	85.5 (29.7)	83.4 (28.6)	77.3 (25.2)	64.1 (17.8)	48.1 (8.9)	34.7 (1.5)	60.5 (15.8)
Daily mean °F (°C)	21.3 (−5.9)	25.9 (−3.4)	38.2 (3.4)	50.9 (10.5)	61.7 (16.5)	71.0 (21.7)	74.4 (23.6)	72.3 (22.4)	65.2 (18.4)	52.8 (11.6)	38.7 (3.7)	26.7 (−2.9)	49.9 (9.9)
Mean daily minimum °F (°C)	12.5 (−10.8)	16.6 (−8.6)	27.5 (−2.5)	38.4 (3.6)	49.6 (9.8)	59.6 (15.3)	63.3 (17.4)	61.2 (16.2)	53.0 (11.7)	41.5 (5.3)	29.3 (−1.5)	18.6 (−7.4)	39.3 (4.1)
Record low °F (°C)	−33 (−36)	−28 (−33)	−17 (−27)	3 (−16)	24 (−4)	36 (2)	42 (6)	37 (3)	22 (−6)	−2 (−19)	−10 (−23)	−28 (−33)	−33 (−36)
Average precipitation inches (mm)	1.17 (30)	1.34 (34)	2.06 (52)	4.02 (102)	4.74 (120)	5.68 (144)	4.47 (114)	4.42 (112)	3.96 (101)	3.00 (76)	2.22 (56)	1.67 (42)	38.75 (984)
Average snowfall inches (cm)	8.7 (22)	8.3 (21)	4.0 (10)	1.5 (3.8)	0.0 (0.0)	0.0 (0.0)	0.0 (0.0)	0.0 (0.0)	0.0 (0.0)	0.6 (1.5)	2.2 (5.6)	9.0 (23)	34.3 (87)
Average precipitation days (≥ 0.01 in)	8.9	7.6	9.5	11.3	13.0	12.3	9.6	9.6	8.8	9.5	8.4	9.1	117.6
Average snowy days (≥ 0.1 in)	6.9	5.1	2.9	1.1	0.0	0.0	0.0	0.0	0.0	0.4	2.0	6.2	24.6
Source: NOAA

== Economy ==
The Marion Economic Development Corporation, a public–private partnership, was founded in 1984 to support business and economic development in the city.

== Demographics ==
Historical populations
Year	Pop.	±%
1860	1,367	—
1870	1,822	+33.3%
1880	1,939	+6.4%
1890	3,094	+59.6%
1900	4,102	+32.6%
1910	4,400	+7.3%
1920	4,138	−6.0%
1930	4,348	+5.1%
1940	4,721	+8.6%
1950	5,916	+25.3%
1960	10,882	+83.9%
1970	18,028	+65.7%
1980	19,474	+8.0%
1990	20,403	+4.8%
2000	26,294	+28.9%
2010	34,768	+32.2%
2020	41,535	+19.5%
Source:"U.S. Census website". United States Census Bureau. and Iowa Data Center; Source: U.S. Decennial Census

=== 2020 census ===
As of the 2020 census, Marion had a population of 41,535, with 16,885 households and 10,994 families residing in the city. The population density was 2,333.0 inhabitants per square mile (900.8/km^{2}). There were 17,810 housing units at an average density of 1,000.4 per square mile (386.2/km^{2}).

99.5% of residents lived in urban areas, while 0.5% lived in rural areas.

Of the 16,885 households, 32.5% had children under the age of 18 living in them. Of all households, 50.5% were married-couple households, 6.8% were cohabitating couples, 26.1% were households with a female householder and no spouse or partner present, and 16.6% were households with a male householder and no spouse or partner present. Non-family households made up 34.9% of all households, 29.5% were made up of individuals, and 12.1% had someone living alone who was 65 years of age or older.

Of these housing units, 5.2% were vacant. The homeowner vacancy rate was 1.2% and the rental vacancy rate was 8.5%.

The median age was 38.6 years. 25.4% of residents were under the age of 18 and 16.9% were 65 years of age or older. The age distribution was 27.6% under 20, 4.9% from 20 to 24, 26.4% from 25 to 44, and 24.2% from 45 to 64. For every 100 females there were 94.3 males, and for every 100 females age 18 and over there were 91.1 males age 18 and over; the gender makeup was 48.5% male and 51.5% female.

Racial composition as of the 2020 census
Race	Number	Percent
White	36,628	88.2%
Black or African American	1,292	3.1%
American Indian and Alaska Native	69	0.2%
Asian	915	2.2%
Native Hawaiian and Other Pacific Islander	14	0.0%
Some other race	360	0.9%
Two or more races	2,257	5.4%
Hispanic or Latino (of any race)	1,301	3.1%

=== 2010 census ===
As of the census of 2010, there were 34,768 people, 14,108 households, and 9,308 families living in the city. The population density was 2,166.2 inhabitants per square mile (836.4/km^{2}). There were 15,064 housing units at an average density of 938.6 per square mile (362.4/km^{2}). The racial makeup of the city was 94% White, 2.0% African American, 0.3% Native American, 1.3% Asian, 0.5% from other races, and 1.9% from two or more races. Hispanic or Latino of any race were 2.0% of the population.

There were 14,108 households, of which 34.8% had children under the age of 18 living with them, 52.5% were married couples living together, 9.8% had a female householder with no husband present, 3.6% had a male householder with no wife present, and 34.0% were non-families. 28.4% of all households were made up of individuals, and 9.6% had someone living alone who was 65 years of age or older. The average household size was 2.44 and the average family size was 3.02.

The median age in the city was 36.1 years. 26.5% of residents were under the age of 18; 7% were between the ages of 18 and 24; 29.3% were from 25 to 44; 24.2% were from 45 to 64; and 13.1% were 65 years of age or older. The gender makeup of the city was 48.3% male and 51.7% female.

=== 2000 census ===
As of the census of 2000, there were 26,294 people, 10,458 households, and 7,174 families living in the city. The population density was 2,192.1 inhabitants per square mile (846.4/km^{2}). There were 10,968 housing units at an average density of 914.4 per square mile (353.1/km^{2}). The racial makeup of the city was 97.01% White, 0.60% African American, 0.19% Native American, 0.94% Asian, 0.03% Pacific Islander, 0.40% from other races, and 0.84% from two or more races. Hispanic or Latino of any race were 1.10% of the population.

There were 10,458 households, out of which 34.5% had children under the age of 18 living with them, 57.1% were married couples living together, 8.4% had a female householder with no husband present, and 31.4% were non-families. 26.0% of all households were made up of individuals, and 7.9% had someone living alone who was 65 years of age or older. The average household size was 2.47 and the average family size was 3.00.

Age spread:26.4% under the age of 18, 8.2% from 18 to 24, 31.9% from 25 to 44, 22.2% from 45 to 64, and 11.4% who were 65 years of age or older. The median age was 35 years. For every 100 females, there were 94.4 males. For every 100 females age 18 and over, there were 91.1 males.

The median income for a household in the city was $48,591, and the median income for a family was $59,110. Males had a median income of $40,766 versus $26,241 for females. The per capita income for the city was $23,158. About 3.9% of families and 5.2% of the population were below the poverty line, including 7.2% of those under age 18 and 5.4% of those age 65 or over.

== Arts and culture ==
=== Museums ===
The Granger House Museum is a restored middle-class family home, representing the structural design of the American Victorian age. The house, built in the 1840s, showcases an extensive collection that includes many original furnishings. The brick carriage house, built in 1879 next to the Granger home, is an untouched treasure and the only one of its design in the Midwest. The Granger house is listed on the National Register of Historic Places, and embodies the lifestyle of a middle-class family living in the late 19th century. The museum has guided tours, demonstrations, and seasonal activities bringing the town's history to life.

The Marion Heritage Center is a church building used originally by the Methodists from the 1850s until 1875. Currently it serves as a community center for educational programs. The history of Marion and its citizens are on display, including art exhibits. Lectures, workshops and other cultural events are scheduled to provide insights into the town's past. In 2008 the center became the permanent home for the fresco mural Communication by Mail painting, by the artist Dan Rhodes in 1939. The building is open all year.

=== Festivals ===
The Marion Arts Festival is a one-day event showcasing 50 artists from across the country. Continuous live music and specialty food vendors are also featured. There is a 5K run with prizes awarded to the top four winners and for the top three placers in 15 different age categories, thanks to race sponsors. In a less competitive event there is the 5K fun walk. The race uses "chip time technology" allowing every participant to know their exact time to complete the race.

The Swamp Fox Festival and Parade is a celebration of the past and the present, the annual Swamp Fox Festival honors Marion's namesake and Revolutionary War hero, Francis Marion, aka the Swamp Fox. Some of the many scheduled events include a golf outing, picnic in the park, live music, craft show, 5K run and fun walk, a pancake breakfast and a community parade.

The Uptown Marion Market features fresh produce, baked goods, honey, flowers, plants, meat, wines, and an array of artisan items. In addition, food vendors onsite offer a variety of take-and-eat items. The market also features live entertainment, cooking demonstrations, children's entertainment, and healthy living programming for all ages.

== Sports ==
Hunters Ridge Golf Course and Country Club is a public golf course featuring bentgrass from tee to green, four sets of tees, 50 bunkers, and 10 water hazards. Hunters Ridge is spread over 400 acres. The front nine winds through a development while holes 10–18 are narrow with many ponds and wetlands entering the field of play.

Indian Creek Golf and Country Club is a 9-hole private course and Country Club facility in Marion, Iowa opened in 1926 features 2,680 yards of golf from the longest tees for a par of 34 . The course rating is 35.2 and it has a slope rating of 114 on Rye grass.

Gardner Golf Course is a public course constructed in 1968 and designed by Herman Thompson. Greens are Bent Grass and Fairways are Bluegrass. The course is owned and maintained by Linn County.

== Education ==
Public education facilities

Marion is served by three public school districts: Marion Independent School District, Linn-Mar Community School District, and Cedar Rapids Community School District.

Marion ISD encompasses much of the south and east sides of Marion.
Linn-Mar, which operates Linn-Mar High School, includes land primarily on Marion's north, west, and far east sides and areas of Cedar Rapids. Linn-Mar is one of the fastest growing school systems in the state of Iowa.

Private education facilities

St. Joseph School (of the Roman Catholic Archdiocese of Dubuque) is a prekindergarten through 8th Grade school founded in 1947. It is a co-ed school with approximately 184 students enrolled.
Grace Baptist School is a K-12 co-ed school with 52 students enrolled.

Being part of the Cedar Rapids metropolitan area Marion citizens have access to all of the advanced education opportunities that are available in the area. See the Cedar Rapids Education section for more details.

== Media ==
=== Print ===
The Gazette is the primary daily newspaper for the Cedar Rapids / Marion metro area.

The Marion Times was a weekly newspaper primarily covering Marion Community and school news. It folded in 2021.

== Transportation ==
U.S. 151 and Iowa Highway 13 run north–south through Marion. Seventh Avenue is the major arterial road heading toward Cedar Rapids.

Until 1971, the Milwaukee Road operated several streamliner passenger trains from major cities in the west to Chicago in the east, making their Cedar Rapids regional stop at Marion station.

Bus Route 20 of Cedar Rapids Transit serves Marion.

Marion also has a small public airport on the east side of the city limits just south of U.S. 151.

== Notable people ==
- Carey Bender (born 1972), NFL running back
- Ray Cheetany (born 1977), UNLV football player
- Cherry Sisters, siblings who formed vaudeville touring act in late 19th century
- Swati Dandekar (born 1951), Iowa state senator
- W. Franklin Dove (1897–1972), biologist
- George Greene (1817–1880), justice of the Iowa Supreme Court
- John L. Grindell (1882–1948), Wisconsin state assemblyman
- Richard Haines (1906–1984), painter and muralist
- Ashley Hinson (born 1983), U.S. representative from Iowa
- Bryce Janey, blues rock musician
- Ben F. Jensen (1892–1970), U.S. Representative from Iowa
- Christian Joy (born 1973), fashion designer
- Frank Lanning (1872–1945), actor
- Ron Livingston (born 1967), actor
- Thomas J. McKean (1810–1870), Union Army general
- Sarah Lacina (born 1984), police officer and Survivor contestant
- Bob Nielson (born 1959), college football coach
- Marcus Paige (born 1993), basketball player at the University of North Carolina
- Hartzell Spence (1908–2001), writer
- Kiah Stokes (born 1993), WNBA basketball player
- Dale O. Thomas (1923–2004), wrestling coach at Oregon State University
- Elizabeth Wilson (born 1964), Iowa state representative
- Marshal Yanda (born 1984), NFL guard

== See also ==
- Marion Economic Development Company
