= Iowa Highway 149 =

State highway in Iowa, United States

Iowa Highway 149
- Iowa 149 highlighted in red

Route information
- Maintained by Iowa DOT
- Length: 65.897 mi (106.051 km)

Major junctions
- South end: US 34 in Ottumwa
- Iowa 92 in Sigourney
- North end: I-80 / CR V77 at Williamsburg (Exit 220)

Location
- Country: United States
- State: Iowa
- Counties: Wapello; Keokuk; Iowa

Highway system
- Iowa Primary Highway System; Interstate; US; State; Secondary; Scenic
← Iowa 148	→ Iowa 150

Iowa Highway 149 is a highway which runs from south to north in Iowa. It has a length of 67 miles (108 km). Iowa 149 begins at U.S. Route 34 in Ottumwa and ends at Williamsburg at Interstate 80. The first 5 miles (8.0 km) of Iowa 149 are overlapped by U.S. Route 63 Business, the former route of U.S. Route 63 through Ottumwa.

== Route description ==
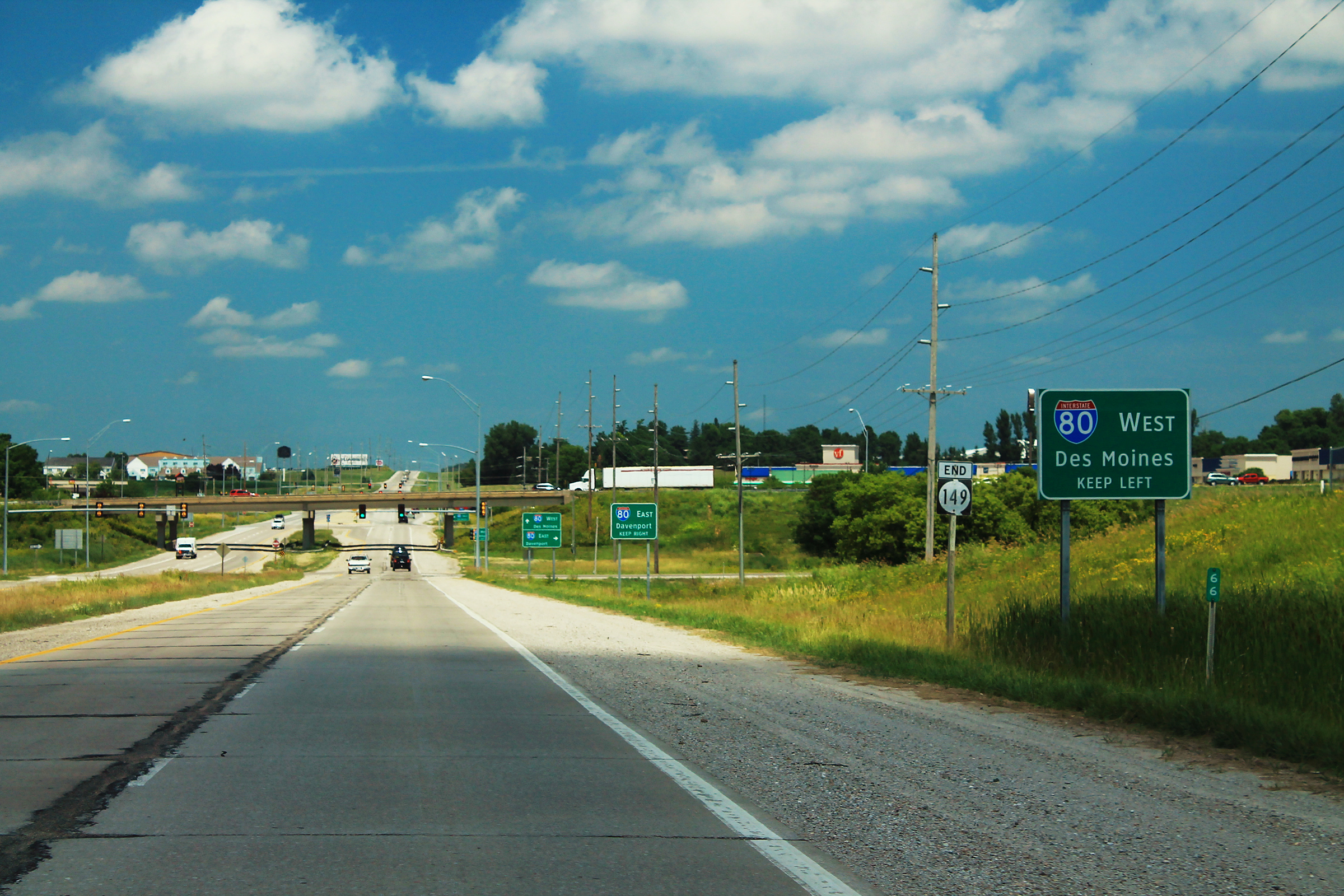
Northern terminus at I-80 in Williamsburg

Iowa Highway 149 begins at U.S. 34 in Ottumwa. It goes north and meets U.S. Route 63 north of Ottumwa and continues north until meeting Iowa Highway 23. It then turns east, and meets Iowa Highway 21 before entering Hedrick. It then continues east through Martinsburg, then turns north at an intersection with Iowa Highway 78. Iowa 149 then continues north into Sigourney. After a brief concurrency with Iowa Highway 92, it turns north towards Webster. At Webster, it meets Iowa Highway 22 and turns east with Iowa 22. Iowa 149 and Iowa 22 run concurrent into South English, then Iowa 149 turns north. Iowa 149 goes north through North English, then continues north until turning east to enter Parnell. Iowa 149 then turns north to go through Williamsburg, then ends at an interchange with Interstate 80.

== History ==
Iowa Highway 149 was created October 16, 1926 from a segment of highway which was previously Iowa Highway 13. It went from U.S. Route 63 north of Ottumwa to U.S. Route 32 (later U.S. Route 6) near the Amana Colonies. In March 1930, the highway was extended north to Cedar Rapids to end at U.S. Route 30, replacing Iowa 150. In 1985, the highway was shortened to its current north terminus as U.S. Route 151 was extended along the former Iowa 149 between U.S. 6 and U.S. 30, and the segment between I-80 and U.S. 6 was converted to Iowa County Road V77.

The southern terminus has been moved twice. On July 16, 1997, Iowa 149 took over an old alignment of U.S. Route 63 between the current U.S. 63 interchange north of Ottumwa and the current Iowa 23 intersection upon the relocation of U.S. 63 between Ottumwa and Oskaloosa. Later, on November 19, 2007, upon another relocation of U.S. 63 in the Ottumwa area, Iowa 149 was extended south to meet in Ottumwa with U.S. Route 34.

== Major intersections ==
County	Location	mi	km	Destinations	Notes
Wapello	Ottumwa	0.000	0.000	US 34 / US 63 Bus. begins – Albia, Fairfield	Southern end of US 63 Business overlap
Wapello	Richland–Highland township line	4.953	7.971	US 63 / US 63 Bus. ends – Ottumwa, Oskaloosa	Northern end of US 63 Business overlap
Mahaska–Keokuk county line	Cedar–Benton township line	10.886	17.519	Iowa 23 north – Oskaloosa	
Keokuk	Benton Township	14.838	23.879	Iowa 21 north – Delta	
Keokuk	Stead Township	21.684	34.897	Iowa 78 east – Richland	
Keokuk	Sigourney	32.893	52.936	Iowa 92 west (Jackson Street) – Oskaloosa	Southern end of Iowa 92 overlap
Keokuk	Sigourney–Van Buren– Plank township tripoint	34.154	54.966	Iowa 92 east – Washington	Northern end of Iowa 92 overlap
Keokuk	Webster	41.351	66.548	Iowa 22 west (Washington Street)	Southern end of Iowa 22 overlap
Keokuk	South English	45.697	73.542	Iowa 22 east (Main Street) – Kalona	Northern end of Iowa 22 overlap
Iowa	Williamsburg	65.897	106.051	I-80 / CR V77 north – Davenport, Des Moines, Amana Colonies	
1.000 mi = 1.609 km; 1.000 km = 0.621 mi: Concurrency terminus
