= Iowa Highway 22 =

State highway in Iowa, United States

Iowa Highway 22
- Iowa 22 highlighted in red

Route information
- Maintained by Iowa DOT
- Length: 97.905 mi (157.563 km)

Major junctions
- West end: Iowa 21 in Thornburg
- US 218 / Iowa 27 at Riverside; US 61 / Iowa 38 at Muscatine; I-280 at Davenport
- East end: US 61 Bus. in Davenport

Location
- Country: United States
- State: Iowa
- Counties: Keokuk; Washington; Johnson; Muscatine; Scott

Highway system
- Iowa Primary Highway System; Interstate; US; State; Secondary; Scenic
← Iowa 21	→ Iowa 23

Iowa Highway 22 (Iowa 22) is a 98-mile (158 km) west–east state highway that traverses primarily rural areas in east-central Iowa. The highway begins near Thornburg at an intersection with Iowa Highway 21 and ends in southwestern Davenport, at U.S. Highway 61 Business.

== Route description ==
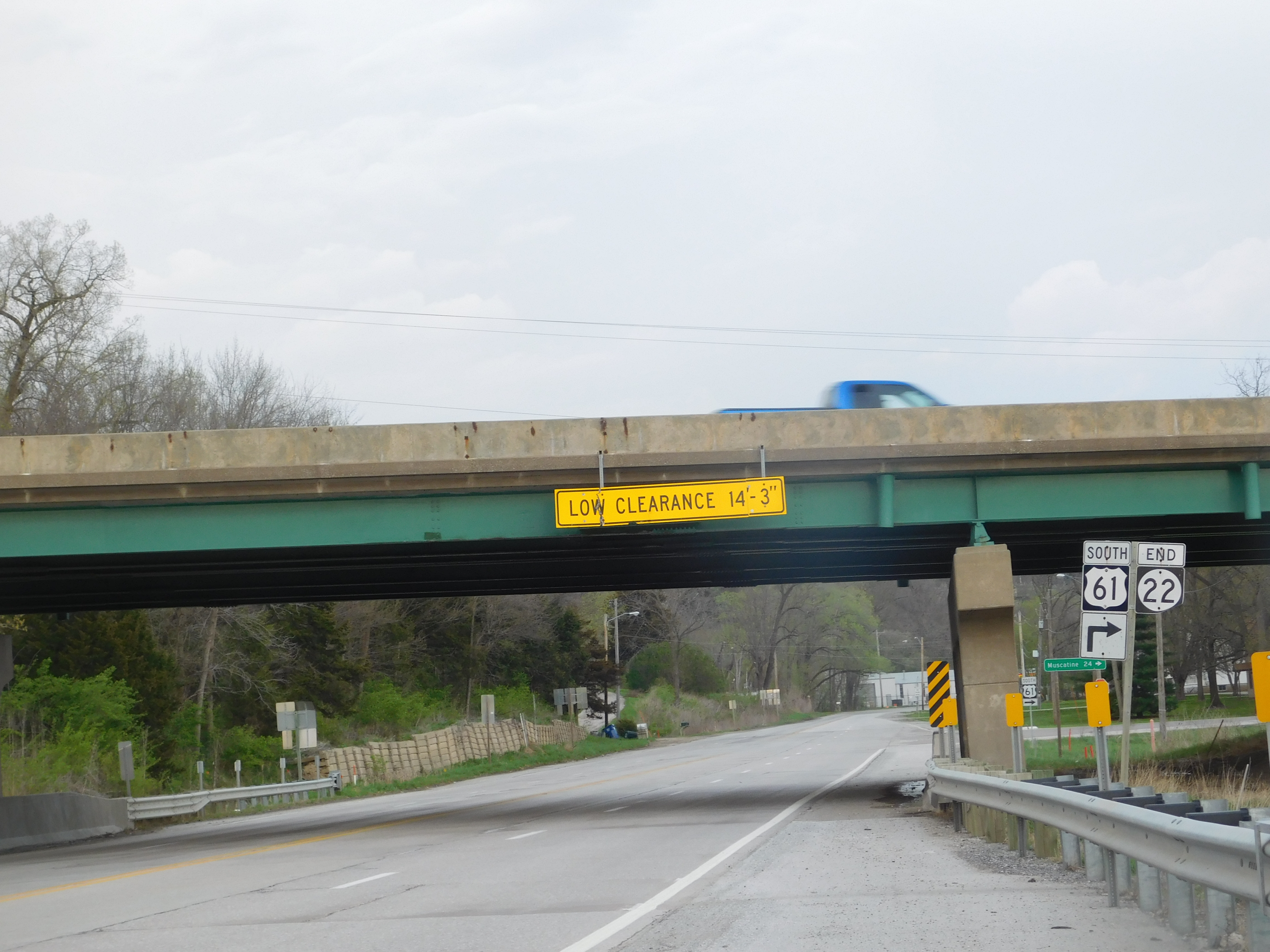
Iowa 22 at its eastern terminus, US 61 Business in Davenport

Iowa Highway 22 begins west of Thornburg at Iowa Highway 21. It continues east through Keswick and Webster. Between Webster and South English, Iowa 22 is overlapped with Iowa Highway 149. It continues east from South English through Kinross and Wellman before intersecting Iowa Highway 1 at Kalona. It proceeds east from Kalona to go through Riverside and then intersects U.S. Highway 218 and Iowa Highway 27. After crossing the Iowa River, it goes through Nichols, where a short overlap with Iowa Highway 70 begins. It then continues eastward and intersects U.S. Highway 61 at Muscatine. It goes around the west and north city limits of Muscatine before intersecting Iowa Highway 38 and Business US 61 and turns south into Muscatine. It then turns east along a route next to the Mississippi River and passes through Buffalo before intersecting Interstate 280 at Davenport. It then turns north to end at U.S. 61.

To locals, Iowa Highway 22 is most notable as one of two main highways connecting Muscatine and Davenport (U.S. Highway 61 being the other). This 24-mile (39 km) eastern section of highway follows the Mississippi River.

The segment of the highway between Muscatine and Davenport is part of the Great River Road.

== History ==
Iowa Highway 22 was designated in 1926, and followed what is now U.S. Highway 61 between Muscatine and Davenport, passing through Blue Grass; U.S. 61 followed the Mississippi River route at the time. The highway was extended to Thornburg in 1931.

For years, several sections of Iowa Highway 22 was either gravel or had a bituminous surface. One of these sections — the section between Muscatine and Blue Grass — was paved in 1957, the same year U.S. 61 and Iowa Highway 22 switched routes; U.S. 61 now went through Blue Grass, while Iowa Highway 22 now followed the Mississippi River through Buffalo.

The last segment — between U.S. Highway 218 east of Riverside to Iowa Highway 405 north of Lone Tree, was upgraded from bituminous to paved in 1988.

== Major intersections ==
County	Location	mi	km	Destinations	Notes
Keokuk	Prairie Township	0.000	0.000	Iowa 21 – What Cheer, Deep River	
Keokuk	Webster	10.644	17.130	Iowa 149 south – Sigourney	Western end of Iowa 149 overlap
Keokuk	South English	14.990	24.124	Iowa 149 north (Davis Street) – North English	Eastern end of Iowa 149 overlap
Washington	Kalona	35.215	56.673	Iowa 1 (1st Street) – Washington, Iowa City	
Washington	Riverside	44.124	71.011	US 218 / Iowa 27 – Iowa City, Mount Pleasant	
Johnson	No major junctions				
Muscatine	Nichols	57.284	92.190	Iowa 70 south (Main Street) – Columbus Junction	Western end of Iowa 70 overlap
Muscatine	Pike Township	60.171	96.836	Iowa 70 north – West Liberty	Eastern end of Iowa 70 overlap
Muscatine	Bloomington Township	69.520	111.882	US 61 south / Iowa 92 west – Wapello	Western end of US 61 and Iowa 92 overlaps
Muscatine	Muscatine	73.546	118.361	US 61 north / US 61 Bus. begins / Iowa 38 north – Wilton, Blue Grass	Eastern end of US 61 overlap; western end of US 61 Business / Iowa 38 overlap
Muscatine	Muscatine	74.814	120.401	US 61 Bus. south / Iowa 38 south / Iowa 92 east / Great River Road south (Park Avenue)	Eastern end of US 61 Business / Iowa 38 / Iowa 92 overlap
Scott	Davenport	96.815	155.809	I-280 – Davenport, Rock Island, Ill.	
Scott	Davenport	97.905	157.563	US 61 Bus. / Great River Road north (River Drive)	
1.000 mi = 1.609 km; 1.000 km = 0.621 mi: Concurrency terminus
