= Iowa Highway 21 =

State highway in Iowa, United States

Iowa Highway 21
- Iowa 21 highlighted in red

Route information
- Maintained by Iowa DOT
- Length: 97.152 mi (156.351 km)

Major junctions
- South end: Iowa 149 near Hedrick
- Iowa 92 near Delta; I-80 near Victor; US 30 near Elberon; Iowa 8 near Dysart
- North end: US 20 / Iowa 27 at Waterloo

Location
- Country: United States
- State: Iowa
- Counties: Keokuk; Poweshiek; Iowa; Benton; Tama; Black Hawk

Highway system
- Iowa Primary Highway System; Interstate; US; State; Secondary; Scenic
← US 20	→ Iowa 22

Iowa Highway 21 (Iowa 21) is a state highway that runs from north to south in central Iowa. It has a length of 97 miles (156 km). Iowa 21 begins at Iowa 149 west of Hedrick and ends at a freeway interchange with U.S. Highway 20 (US 20) in Waterloo.

== Route description ==
Iowa 21 begins one mile (1.6 km) west of Hedrick and goes north through Delta before intersecting Iowa 92. It proceeds through What Cheer before intersecting Iowa 22 west of Thornburg. It continues north to Deep River where it intersects Iowa 85. After passing through Guernsey, it then intersects Interstate 80, then meets US 6. It overlaps with U.S. 6 going eastward, then turns north near Victor. It then intersects Iowa 212 before entering Belle Plaine, then intersects US 30. It goes north to Dysart, where it turns west, overlapping with Iowa 8. It then turns north and ends at US 20 at the southern city limit of Waterloo.

== History ==
The current version of Iowa 21 is the second occurrence of the route number in the state. The first one went north from Ida Grove to the Minnesota border and was eventually replaced by US 59.

The current Iowa 21 was created in October 1934 and went between Victor and Dysart. It was extended south in 1939 to from Victor to Iowa 92, north from Dysart to U.S. 20 in Waterloo in 1969, and south again from Iowa 92 to Iowa 149 in 1980.

== Major intersections ==
County	Location	mi	km	Destinations	Notes
Keokuk	Van Buren–Plank township line	0.000	0.000	Iowa 149 – Hedrick	
Keokuk	Delta	12.314	19.817	Iowa 92 – Sigourney, Oskaloosa	
Keokuk	Thornburg	20.311	32.687	Iowa 22 east – Thornburg	
Poweshiek	Deep River Township	28.958	46.603	Iowa 85 west / CR F52 east – Deep River, Millersburg	
Poweshiek	Warren Township	37.115	59.731	I-80 – Des Moines, Davenport	
Poweshiek	Warren Township	40.619	65.370	US 6 west – Grinnell	Southern end of US 6 overlap
Iowa	Hartford Township	44.852	72.182	US 6 east – Marengo	Northern end of US 6 overlap
Iowa	Honey Creek Township	52.030	83.734	Iowa 212 east – Marengo	
Tama–Benton county line	York–Kane township line	60.801	97.850	US 30 – Tama, Cedar Rapids	
Tama–Benton county line	Dysart	75.773	121.945	Iowa 8 east / CR V37 north – Vinton	Southern end of Iowa 8 overlap
Tama	Clark Township	76.262	122.732	Iowa 8 west – Traer	Northern end of Iowa 8 overlap
Black Hawk	Waterloo	97.152	156.351	US 20 / Iowa 27 – Waterloo, Dubuque, Fort Dodge	
1.000 mi = 1.609 km; 1.000 km = 0.621 mi: Concurrency terminus
