= Iowa Highway 23 =

State highway in Iowa, United States

Iowa Highway 23
- Iowa 23 highlighted in red

Route information
- Maintained by Iowa DOT
- Length: 16.022 mi (25.785 km)
- Existed: 1997–present

Major junctions
- South end: Iowa 149 near Fremont
- North end: Iowa 92 at Oskaloosa

Location
- Country: United States
- State: Iowa
- Counties: Keokuk; Mahaska

Highway system
- Iowa Primary Highway System; Interstate; US; State; Secondary; Scenic
← Iowa 22	→ Iowa 23

Iowa Highway 23 (Iowa 23) is a 16-mile-long (26 km) state highway in the southeastern part of the state. Its designation begins at Iowa 149 north of Ottumwa and ends at Iowa 92 in Oskaloosa.

The route was created in 1997 when U.S. Highway 63 (US 63) was rerouted along a new, four-lane expressway that subsumed part of a previous Iowa 23. The new Iowa 23 was signed along the two-lane road that was vacated by US 63.

== Route description ==
Iowa 23 begins at an intersection with Iowa 149 along the Mahaska–Keokuk county line north of Ottumwa. It heads north along the county line for three miles (4.8 km) before it eases to the northwest into Mahaska County and into Fremont. West of Fremont, the highway follows an east-to-west path until it reaches Cedar, an unincorporated community. In Cedar, Iowa 23 turns to the northwest. It continues to the northwest over a plain. As it approaches Oskaloosa, the corn and soybean fields that had lined the road give way to agribusinesses of on the outskirts of southeastern Oskaloosa. The roadway turns to the north near University Park. It then enters the city limits of Oskaloosa again where it ends shortly thereafter at Iowa 92.

== History ==
There have been 4 versions of Iowa Highway 23. The first lasted from 1920 to 1926 and went from the South Dakota border west of Sioux City to Fort Dodge. The second lasted from 1926 to January 1, 1969, and was a highway that went south from Milton to the Missouri border. The third version of Iowa Highway 23 lasted from January 1, 1969, until July 16, 1997, and went from Eddyville to Ottumwa. This version was replaced by U.S. Highway 63.

The current version of Iowa Highway 23 was created July 16, 1997 and was formerly the route for U.S. Highway 63.

== Major intersections ==
County	Location	mi	km	Destinations	Notes
Mahaska–Keokuk county line	Cedar–Benton township line	0.000	0.000	Iowa 149 – Hedrick, Ottumwa	
Mahaska	Oskaloosa	16.022	25.785	Iowa 92 – Sigourney, Knoxville	
1.000 mi = 1.609 km; 1.000 km = 0.621 mi
