= Iowa Highway 78 =

State highway in Iowa, United States

Iowa Highway 78
- Iowa 78 highlighted in red

Route information
- Maintained by Iowa DOT
- Length: 58.429 mi (94.032 km)
- Existed: 1920s–present

Major junctions
- West end: Iowa 149 near Martinsburg
- US 218 / Iowa 27 near Olds
- East end: US 61 / CR H22 near Morning Sun

Location
- Country: United States
- State: Iowa
- Counties: Keokuk; Washington; Jefferson; Henry; Louisa

Highway system
- Iowa Primary Highway System; Interstate; US; State; Secondary; Scenic
← US 77	→ I-80

Iowa Highway 78 (Iowa 78) is a 59-mile-long (95 km) state highway which runs from east to west in southeastern Iowa. The route begins east of Martinsburg at Iowa Highway 149, and ends at U.S. Highway 61 east of Morning Sun. The route has existed since the 1920s, when it was a short spur route between Olds and Winfield. By the 1950s, the route reached its current extents.

== Route description ==
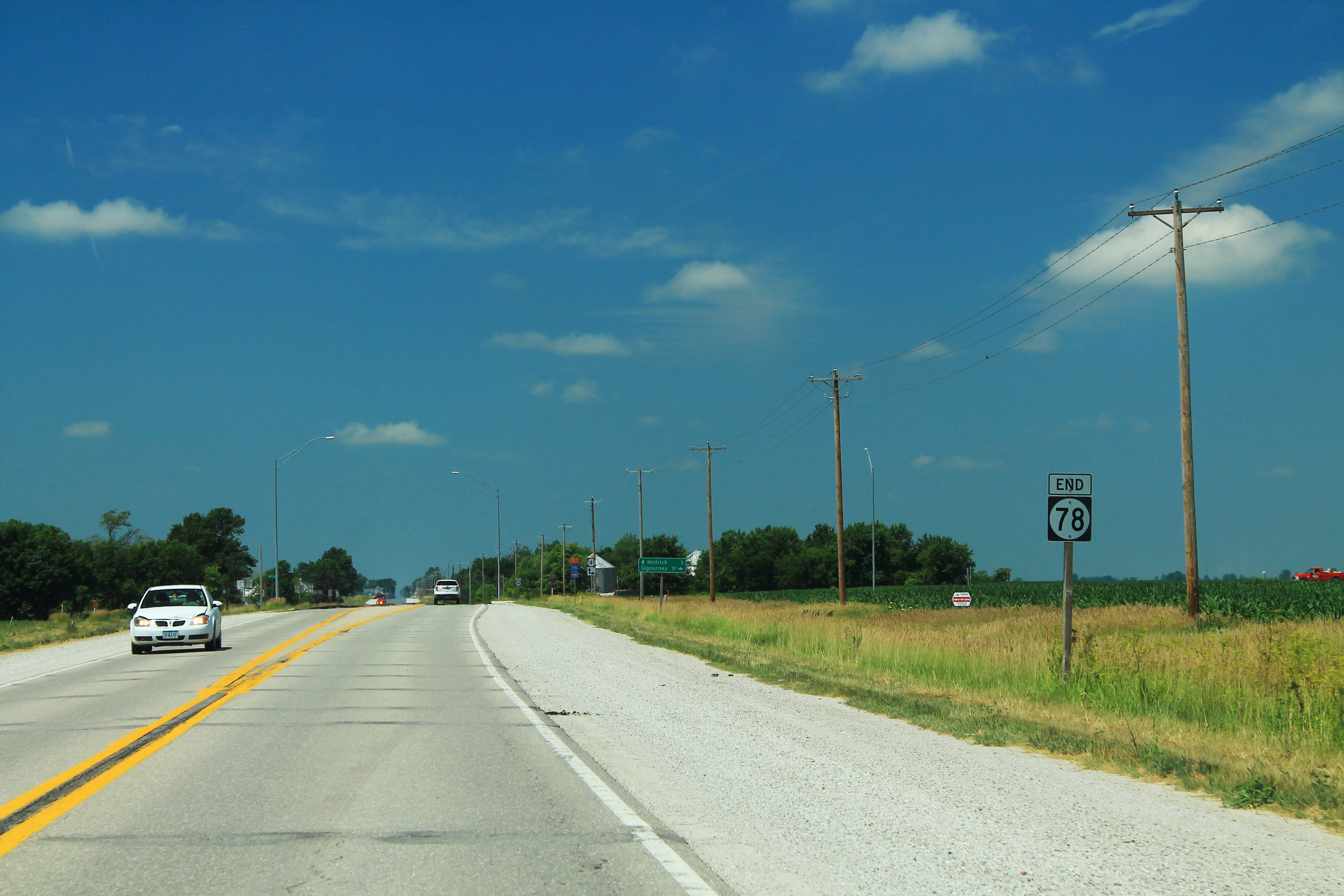
Western terminus

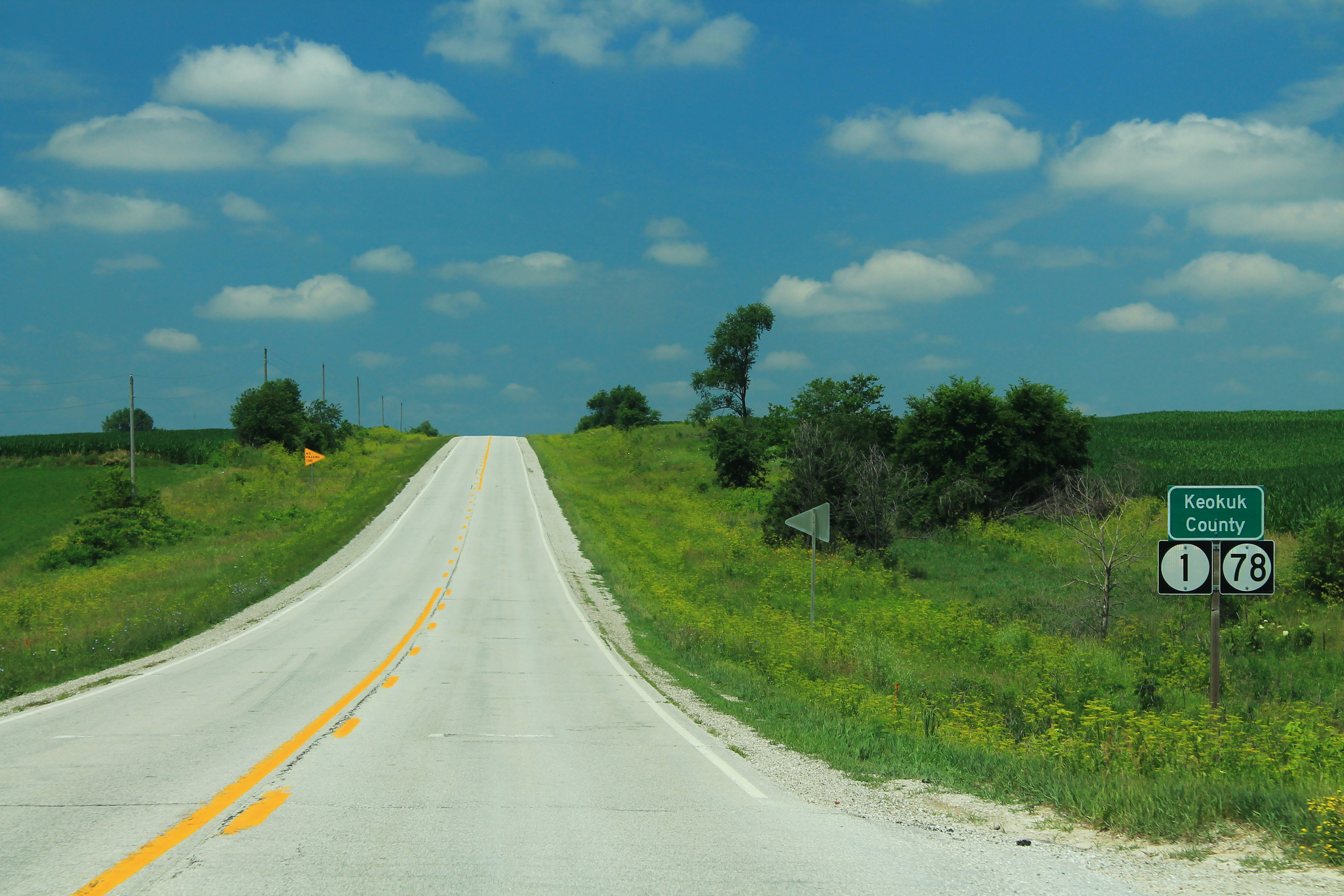
Iowa 1 and Iowa 78 west of Brighton

Iowa Highway 78 begins two miles (3.2 km) east of Martinsburg in Keokuk County at an intersection with Iowa 149. Iowa 78 heads east, serving the communities of Pekin, Ollie, and Richland. East of Richland, it intersects Iowa 1; the two routes cross into Washington County, running together for 7 miles (11 km). At Brighton, the two routes split – Iowa 1 to the north and Iowa 78 to the south. It briefly ducks into Jefferson County before entering Henry County near Coppock.

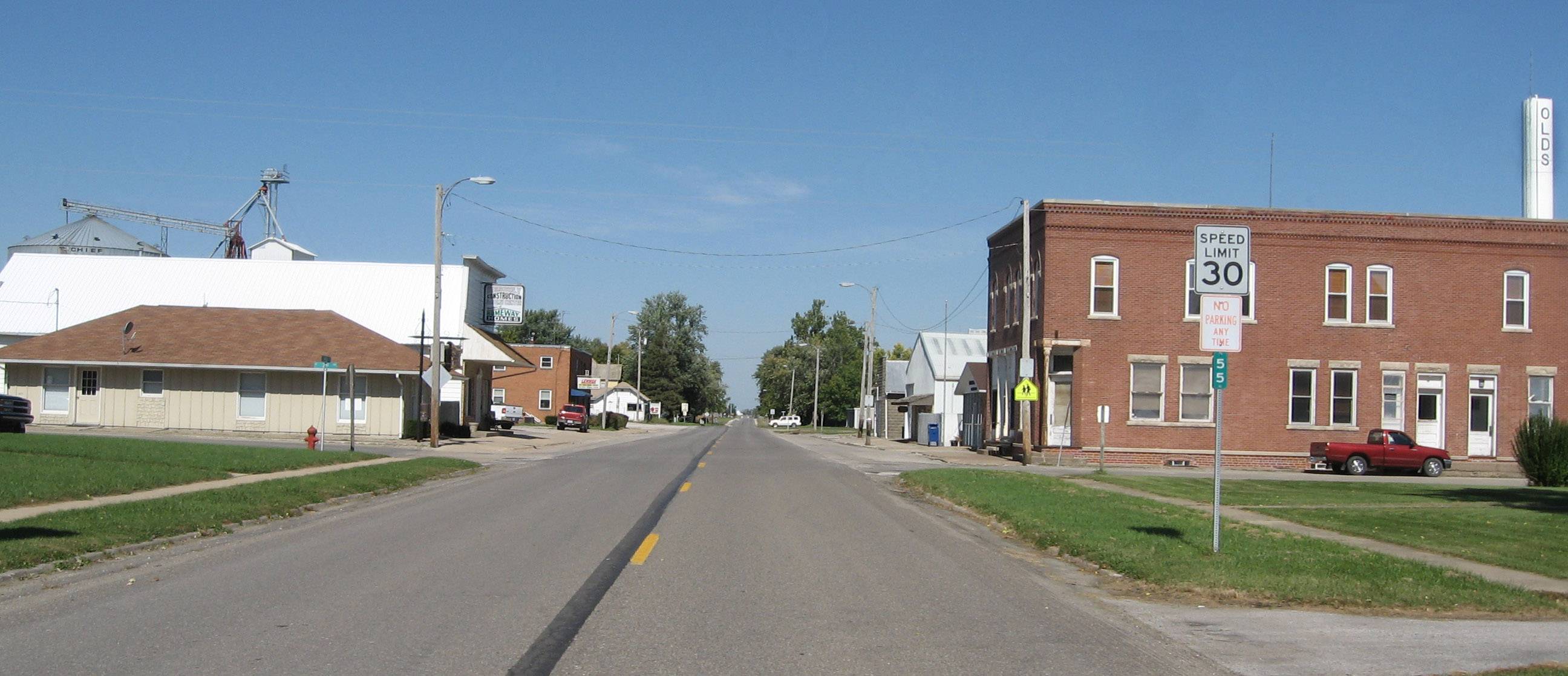
Iowa 78 through Olds.

Between Wayland and Winfield, Iowa 78 has a stairstep route, with short sections of north–south road followed by longer stretches of east–west road. Through Olds, Iowa 78 runs parallel to the US / Iowa 27 expressway to the east before intersecting it south of town. South of Winfield, it again becomes an east–west route, where it passes through Morning Sun. Four miles (6.4 km) east of Morning Sun, the route ends at US 61.

== History ==
Primary Road No. 78 was created in the 1920s as a 5-mile-long (8.0 km) spur route which connected Winfield to Primary Road No. 40 at Olds. By 1947, the route had been extended in both directions. It began at Iowa 77 in Richland in the west, and ended at U.S. Highway 61 in the east. The original section from Olds to just south of Winfield was the only fully paved road at the time. The short segment from Iowa 78 to Winfield was designated Iowa 249. That segment was turned over to Henry County on July 1, 2003. By 1952, the route had been extended west to Iowa 149 near Martinsburg, absorbing most of Iowa 304, which served Ollie. The section from Iowa 78 to Ollie remained as Iowa 304 until 1980. Before the US 218 / Iowa 27 freeway was built, Iowa 78 overlapped US 218 through Olds. After the expressway opened in 1999, US 218 was placed onto the new road while Iowa 78 stayed on the old two-lane alignment.

== Major intersections ==
County	Location	mi	km	Destinations	Notes
Keokuk	Jackson Township	0.000	0.000	Iowa 149 – Hedrick, Sigourney	
Keokuk	Richland Township	12.980	20.889	Iowa 1 south – Fairfield	Western end of Iowa 1 overlap
Washington	Brighton	20.588	33.133	Iowa 1 north / CR W40 – Washington	Eastern end of Iowa 1 overlap
Jefferson	No major junctions				
Henry	Wayne Township	37.970	61.107	US 218 / Iowa 27 – Mount Pleasant, Iowa City	
Louisa	Wapello Township	58.429	94.032	US 61 / CR H22 to CR X99 – Mediapolis, Wapello	
1.000 mi = 1.609 km; 1.000 km = 0.621 mi
