= Lancaster Township =

Lancaster Township may refer to:

== Canada ==
- Lancaster Township, Ontario, now part of South Glengarry

== United States ==
Arkansas

- Lancaster Township, Crawford County, Arkansas, in Crawford County, Arkansas

Illinois

- Lancaster Township, Stephenson County, Illinois

Indiana

- Lancaster Township, Huntington County, Indiana
- Lancaster Township, Jefferson County, Indiana
- Lancaster Township, Wells County, Indiana

Iowa

- East Lancaster Township, Keokuk County, Iowa
- West Lancaster Township, Keokuk County, Iowa

Kansas

- Lancaster Township, Atchison County, Kansas

Pennsylvania

- Lancaster Township, Butler County, Pennsylvania
- Lancaster Township, Lancaster County, Pennsylvania
