= Steady Run Township, Keokuk County, Iowa =

Township in Keokuk County, Iowa, U.S.

Coordinates: 42°12′N 92°14′W

Steady Run Township is a township in Keokuk County, Iowa, USA.
