= Washington Township, Keokuk County, Iowa =

Township in Iowa, USA

Coordinates: 42°23′N 92°21′W

Washington Township is a township in Keokuk County, Iowa.
