= Keota Community School District =

Public school district in Keota, Iowa, United States

Coordinates: 41.369°N 91.953°W

Location
- Keota, Iowa Keokuk and Washington counties United States

District information
- Type: Local school district
- Motto: Dedicated to Preparing Lifelong Learners for an Ever Changing Society
- Grades: K-12
- Superintendent: Lisa Brenneman
- Schools: 2
- Budget: $5,609,000 (2020-21)
- NCES District ID: 1915660

Students and staff
- Students: 321 (2022-23)
- Teachers: 30.28 FTE
- Staff: 34.08 FTE
- Student–teacher ratio: 10.60
- Athletic conference: South Iowa Cedar League
- District mascot: Eagles
- Colors: Purple and gold

Other information
- Website: www.keota.k12.ia.us

The Keota Community School District, or Keota Community Schools, is a rural public school district serving the towns of Keota and Harper and surrounding areas in eastern Keokuk and western Washington counties.

The school, which serves all grade levels PreK-12 in one building, is located at 505 N Ellis Street in Keota.

The school's mascot is the Eagle. Their colors are purple and gold.

== Schools ==
- Keota Elementary School
- Keota High School

=== Athletics ===
The Eagles compete in the South Iowa Cedar League Conference in the following sports:

- Cross Country (boys and girls)
- Volleyball (girls)
- Football (boys) (jointly with Sigourney Community School District as Sigourney/Keota)
  - State Champions - 1995, 2001, 2005 (as Sigourney/Keota)
- Basketball (boys and girls)
  - Boys' State Champions 1989
- Wrestling (boys and girls) (jointly with Sigourney Community School District as Sigourney/Keota)
- Track and Field (boys and girls)
- Golf (boys and girls)
- Baseball (boys)
- Softball (girls)

== See also ==
- List of school districts in Iowa
- List of high schools in Iowa
