= Warren Township, Keokuk County, Iowa =

Township in Iowa, USA

Coordinates: 42°18′N 92°21′W

Warren Township is a township in Keokuk County, Iowa, USA.
