= Sigourney Community School District =

Public school district in Sigourney, Iowa, United States

Coordinates: 41.329022°N 92.193882°W

Location
- Sigourney, Iowa Keokuk County United States
- Coordinates: 41.329022, -92.193882

District information
- Type: Local school district
- Grades: K–12
- Superintendent: Kevin Hatfield
- Schools: 2
- Budget: $8,220,000 (2020-21)
- NCES District ID: 1931680

Students and staff
- Students: 593 (2022-23)
- Teachers: 41.62 FTE
- Staff: 41.50 FTE
- Student–teacher ratio: 14.25
- Athletic conference: South Iowa Cedar League
- District mascot: Savages
- Colors: Black and gold

Other information
- Website: sigourneyschools.com

Sigourney Community School District is a rural public school district headquartered in Sigourney, Iowa. The district is completely within Keokuk County and serves Sigourney, Delta, and Hayesville. It operates a preschool/elementary school and a junior/senior high school.

In 2016 the district agreed to begin a superintendent-sharing arrangement with the Pekin Community School District.

== Schools ==
- Sigourney Elementary School
- Sigourney Jr.-Sr. High School

=== Athletics ===
The Savages compete in the South Iowa Cedar League Conference in the following sports:

- Cross Country (boys and girls)
- Volleyball (girls)
- Football (boys) (jointly with Keota Community School District as Sigourney/Keota)
  - State Champions – 1979 (Sigourney); 1995, 2001 and 2005 (as Sigourney/Keota)
- Basketball (boys and girls)
- Wrestling (boys and girls)
- Track and Field (boys and girls)
  - Girls' Class 1A State Champions – 1990, 1991, 1992
- Golf (boys and girls)
- Baseball (boys)
- Softball (girls)

== See also ==
- List of school districts in Iowa
- List of high schools in Iowa
