= Cedar, Iowa =

- Unincorporated community
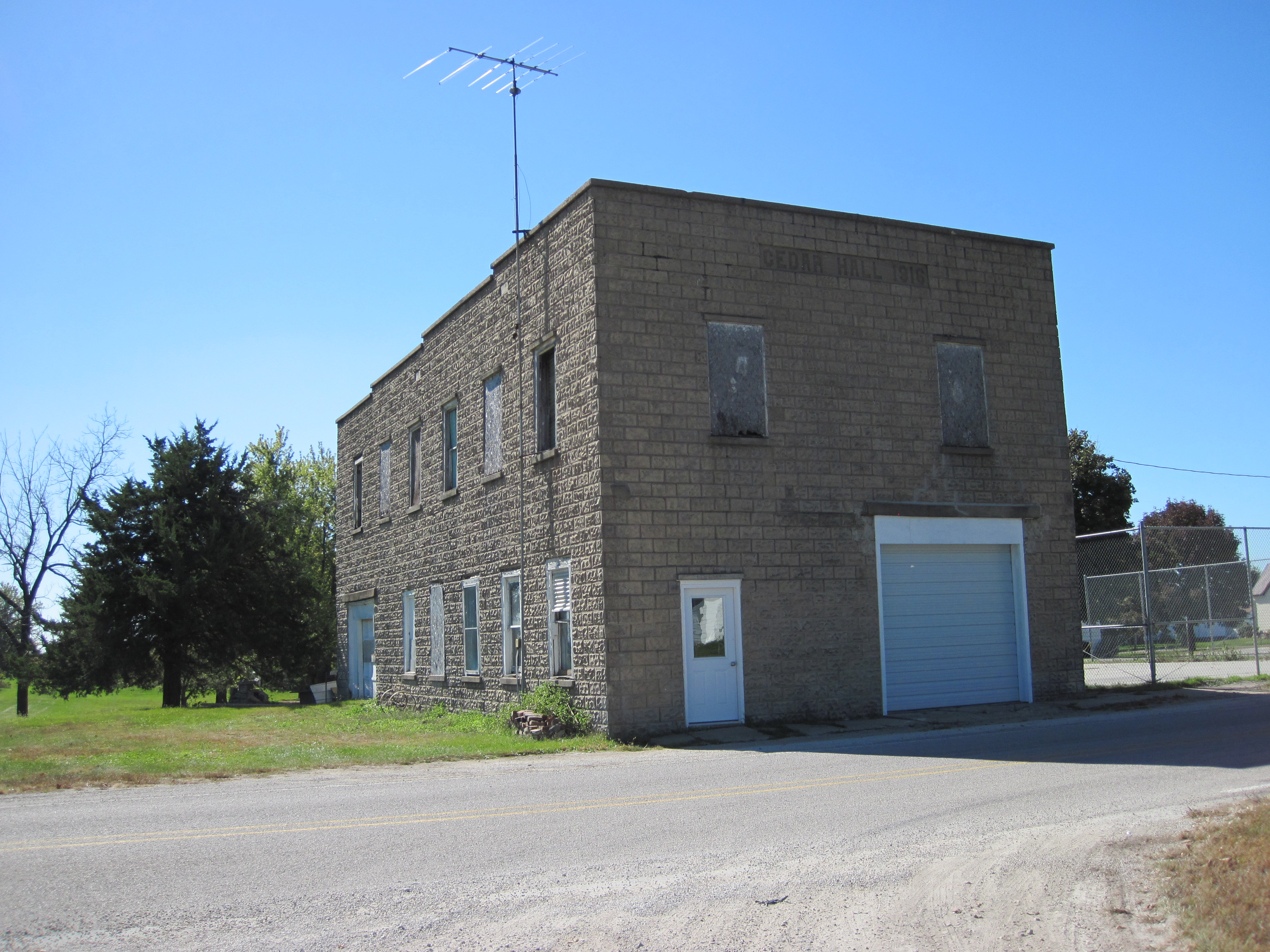
- Cedar Hall

- Location within Iowa Location within the United States
- Coordinates: 41°12′44″N 92°31′33″W
- Country: United States
- State: Iowa
- County: Mahaska
- Elevation: 814 ft (248 m)
- Time zone: UTC-6 (Central (CST))
  - Summer (DST): UTC-5 (CDT)
- ZIP code: 52543
- Area code: 641
- GNIS feature ID: 455220

Cedar is an unincorporated community in southeastern Mahaska County, Iowa, United States. It lies along Iowa Highway 23 southeast of the city of Oskaloosa, the county seat of Mahaska County.

Cedar has a Methodist church, Christian Reformed church, and a grain elevator.

== History ==
A post office opened in 1874.

The Burlington and Western Railway arrived in Cedar in late 1882. This was a narrow gauge line, widened to standard gauge in 1902 and taken over by the Chicago, Burlington and Quincy. the Burlington line was abandoned in 1934.

Cedar's population was 53 in 1925. The population was 113 in 1940.
