= Hayesville, Iowa =

- City
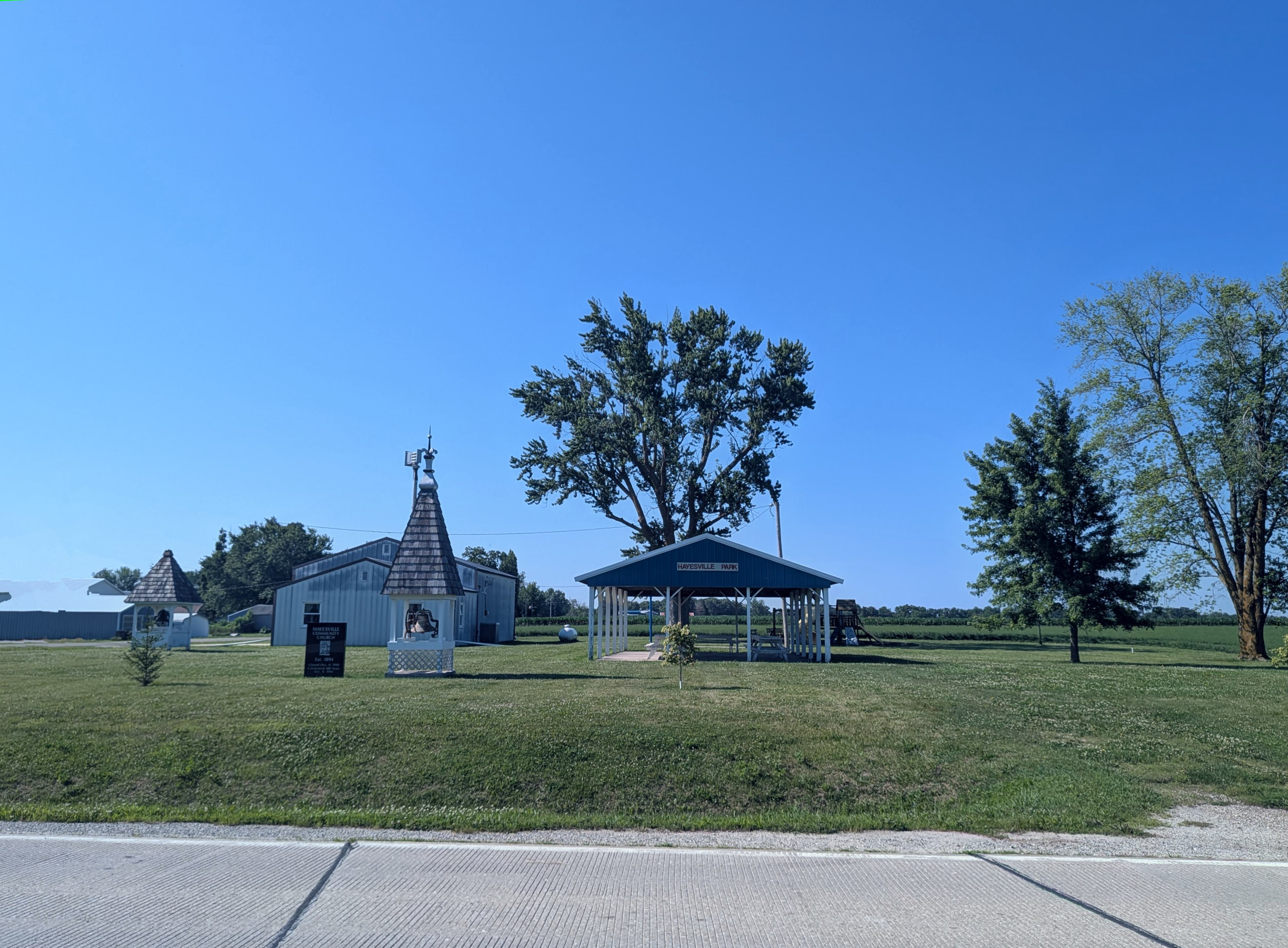
- Hayesville City Park

- Location of Hayesville, Iowa
- Coordinates: 41°15′53″N 92°14′56″W
- Country: United States
- State: Iowa
- County: Keokuk

Area
  - Total: 0.25 sq mi (0.65 km^{2})
  - Land: 0.25 sq mi (0.65 km^{2})
  - Water: 0 sq mi (0.00 km^{2})
- Elevation: 794 ft (242 m)

Population (2020)
  - Total: 41
  - Density: 164.0/sq mi (63.31/km^{2})
- Time zone: UTC-6 (Central (CST))
  - Summer (DST): UTC-5 (CDT)
- ZIP code: 52562
- Area code: 641
- FIPS code: 19-35445
- GNIS feature ID: 2394333

Hayesville is a city in Keokuk County, Iowa, United States. The population was 41 at the time of the 2020 census.

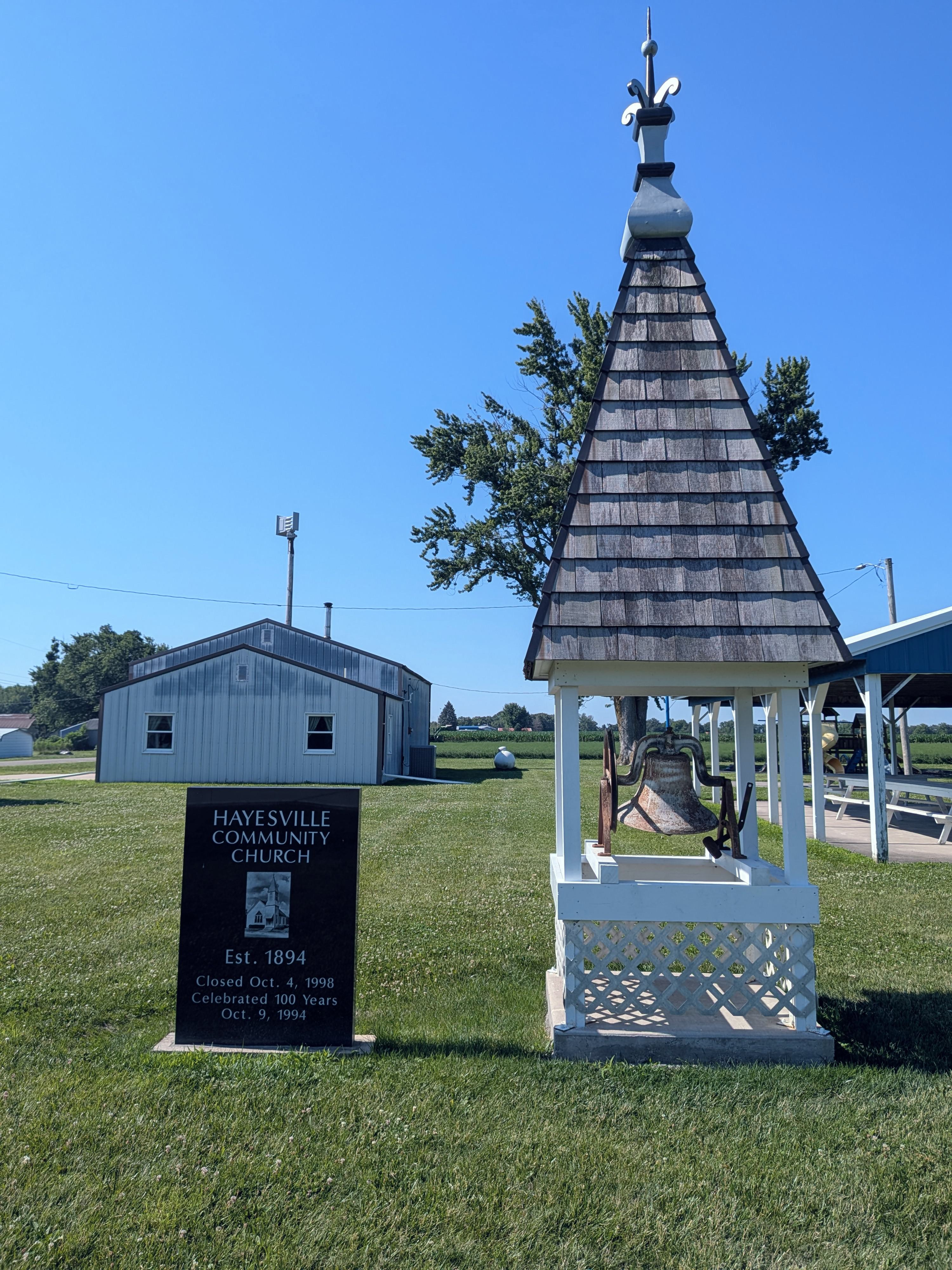
The spire from the Hayesville Community Church, which closed in 1998 after 104 years in operation.

== Geography ==
According to the United States Census Bureau, the city has a total area of 0.25 square miles (0.65 km^{2}), all of it land.

== Demographics ==
Historical populations
Year	Pop.	±%
1920	124	—
1930	133	+7.3%
1940	120	−9.8%
1950	137	+14.2%
1960	122	−10.9%
1970	93	−23.8%
1980	93	+0.0%
1990	62	−33.3%
2000	64	+3.2%
2010	50	−21.9%
2020	41	−18.0%
Source:"U.S. Census website". United States Census Bureau. and Iowa Data Center; Source: U.S. Decennial Census

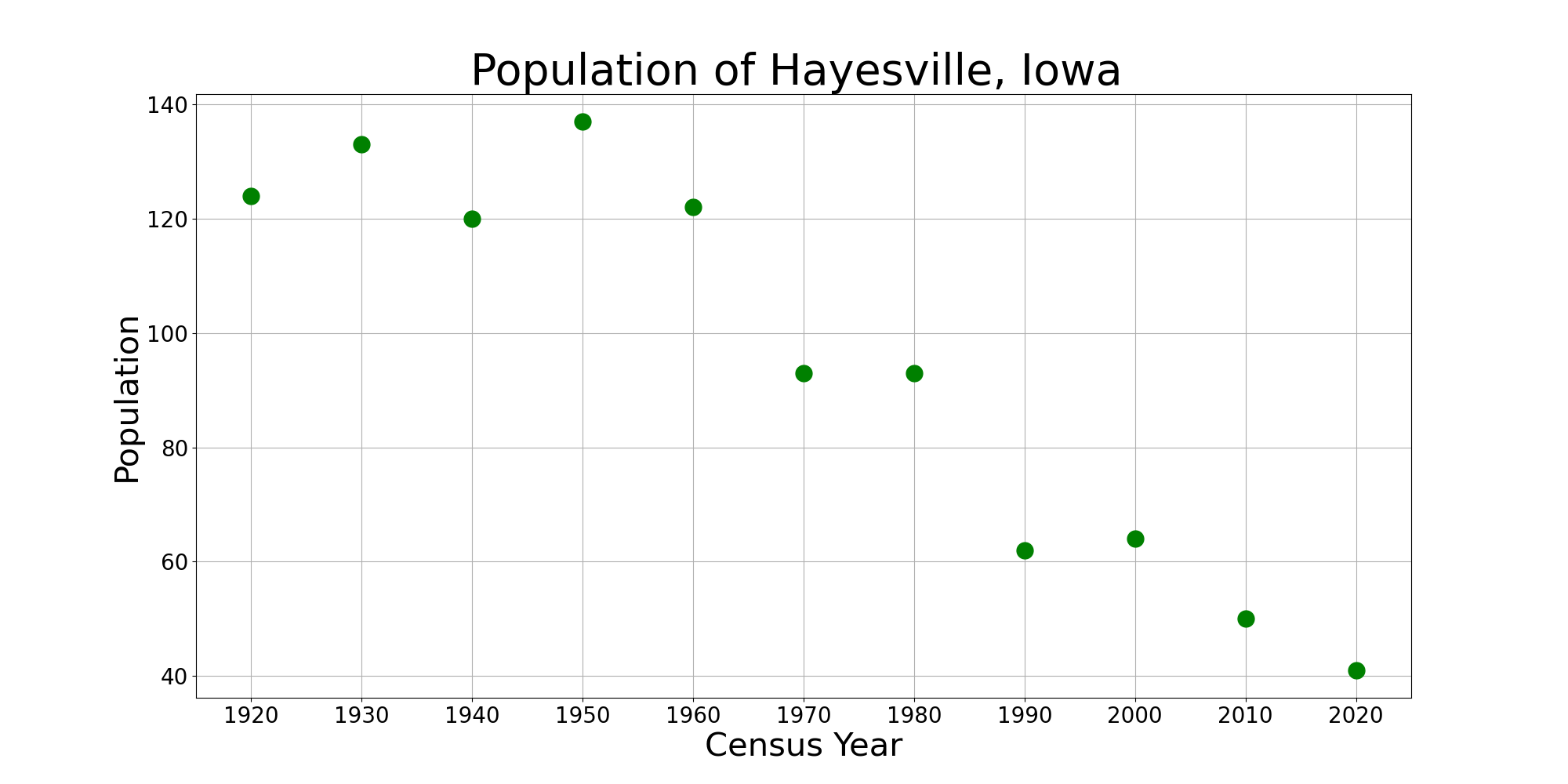
The population of Hayesville, Iowa from US census data

=== 2020 census ===
As of the census of 2020, there were 41 people, 23 households, and 14 families residing in the city. The population density was 164.0 inhabitants per square mile (63.3/km^{2}). There were 25 housing units at an average density of 100.0 per square mile (38.6/km^{2}). The racial makeup of the city was 100.0% White, 0.0% Black or African American, 0.0% Native American, 0.0% Asian, 0.0% Pacific Islander, 0.0% from other races and 0.0% from two or more races. Hispanic or Latino persons of any race comprised 0.0% of the population.

Of the 23 households, 26.1% of which had children under the age of 18 living with them, 52.2% were married couples living together, 4.3% were cohabitating couples, 13.0% had a female householder with no spouse or partner present and 30.4% had a male householder with no spouse or partner present. 39.1% of all households were non-families. 39.1% of all households were made up of individuals, 30.4% had someone living alone who was 65 years old or older.

The median age in the city was 52.4 years. 9.8% of the residents were under the age of 20; 0.0% were between the ages of 20 and 24; 22.0% were from 25 and 44; 41.5% were from 45 and 64; and 26.8% were 65 years of age or older. The gender makeup of the city was 58.5% male and 41.5% female.

=== 2010 census ===
As of the census of 2010, there were 50 people, 24 households, and 16 families living in the city. The population density was 200.0 inhabitants per square mile (77.2/km^{2}). There were 25 housing units at an average density of 100.0 per square mile (38.6/km^{2}). The racial makeup of the city was 100.0% White.

There were 24 households, of which 16.7% had children under the age of 18 living with them, 58.3% were married couples living together, 4.2% had a female householder with no husband present, 4.2% had a male householder with no wife present, and 33.3% were non-families. 20.8% of all households were made up of individuals, and 12.5% had someone living alone who was 65 years of age or older. The average household size was 2.08 and the average family size was 2.44.

The median age in the city was 55.3 years. 10% of residents were under the age of 18; 6% were between the ages of 18 and 24; 18% were from 25 to 44; 38% were from 45 to 64; and 28% were 65 years of age or older. The gender makeup of the city was 48.0% male and 52.0% female.

=== 2000 census ===
As of the census of 2000, there were 64 people, 28 households, and 19 families living in the city. The population density was 250.5 inhabitants per square mile (96.7/km^{2}). There were 32 housing units at an average density of 125.3 per square mile (48.4/km^{2}). The racial makeup of the city was 100.00% White.

There were 28 households, out of which 25.0% had children under the age of 18 living with them, 60.7% were married couples living together, 3.6% had a female householder with no husband present, and 32.1% were non-families. 21.4% of all households were made up of individuals, and 14.3% had someone living alone who was 65 years of age or older. The average household size was 2.29 and the average family size was 2.68.

In the city, the population was spread out, with 18.8% under the age of 18, 7.8% from 18 to 24, 23.4% from 25 to 44, 29.7% from 45 to 64, and 20.3% who were 65 years of age or older. The median age was 45 years. For every 100 females, there were 82.9 males. For every 100 females age 18 and over, there were 92.6 males.

The median income for a household in the city was $38,125, and the median income for a family was $36,250. Males had a median income of $33,750 versus $16,250 for females. The per capita income for the city was $15,973. None of the population and none of the families were below the poverty line.

== Education ==
The community is within the Sigourney Community School District.
