= Atwood, Iowa =

- Unincorporated community
- Location within Iowa Location within the United States
- Coordinates: 41°19′30″N 92°24′22″W
- Country: United States
- State: Iowa
- County: Keokuk
- Township: Warren
- Elevation: 699 ft (213 m)
- Time zone: UTC-6 (Central (CST))
  - Summer (DST): UTC-5 (CDT)
- Area code: 641
- GNIS feature ID: 464274

Atwood is an unincorporated community in Keokuk County, in the U.S. state of Iowa.

== History ==
Atwood contained a post office from 1889 until 1899. The community was named for Daniel Atwood, a railroad official. The population was 12 in 1940.
