= Tri-County Community School District (Iowa) =

Public school district in Thornburg, Iowa, United States

Location
- Thornburg, Iowa Keokuk, Mahaska and Powesheik counties United States
- Coordinates: 41.453331°N 92.335271°W

District information
- Type: Local school district
- Grades: K-12
- Superintendent: Chad Straight
- Schools: 3
- Budget: $4,546,000 (2020-21)
- NCES District ID: 1928020

Students and staff
- Students: 211 (2022-23)
- Teachers: 20.26 FTE
- Staff: 23.57 FTE
- Student–teacher ratio: 10.41
- Athletic conference: South Iowa Cedar League
- District mascot: Trojans
- Colors: Black and Gold

Other information
- Website: www.tri-countyschools.com

The Tri-County Community School District, or Tri-County Community School, is a rural public school district based in Thornburg, Iowa, and serves the towns of Thornburg, What Cheer, Keswick, and Gibson and surrounding areas in northwestern Keokuk County, with smaller areas in Mahaska and Poweshiek counties.

The school's mascot is the Trojans. Their colors are black and gold. There is little diversity in this school district with a diversity score of .09. Tri-County Community school district has a ranking of #203 of 329 of the safest schools in Iowa and a ranking of #215 of 328 of the best teachers in Iowa. According to Niche, Tri-County Community School District has an overall grade of C−, their elementary specifically has a grade of C−, and their diversity grade is a C+. The student-teacher ratio is 11:1, versus the state average of 15:1. As for where academics are involved, the Tri-County Community school district as a whole has an average math proficiency score of 64%, versus the Iowa public school average of 76% and a below-average score in reading proficiency, having a score of 70% versus the statewide average of 74%.

== History ==
Tri-County school was originally built in 1956, and officially opened in 1966. At first, the district had four buildings: they were located in Keswick, What Cheer, Gibson, and Thornburg. The What Cheer center was demolished in 1978. In 1993, all of the classes in Tri-County were originally held in Thornburg, except for kindergarten through the third grade, which were held in Keswick. The expansion of the school in Thornburg had plans to demolish the North High building, which led to the additions of secondary and elementary classrooms and a library. The building's current design was built in 1998, which led to the elementary grades from the Keswick building to be transferred over to Thornburg. making a Pre-K through 12th grade school district.

== Schools ==
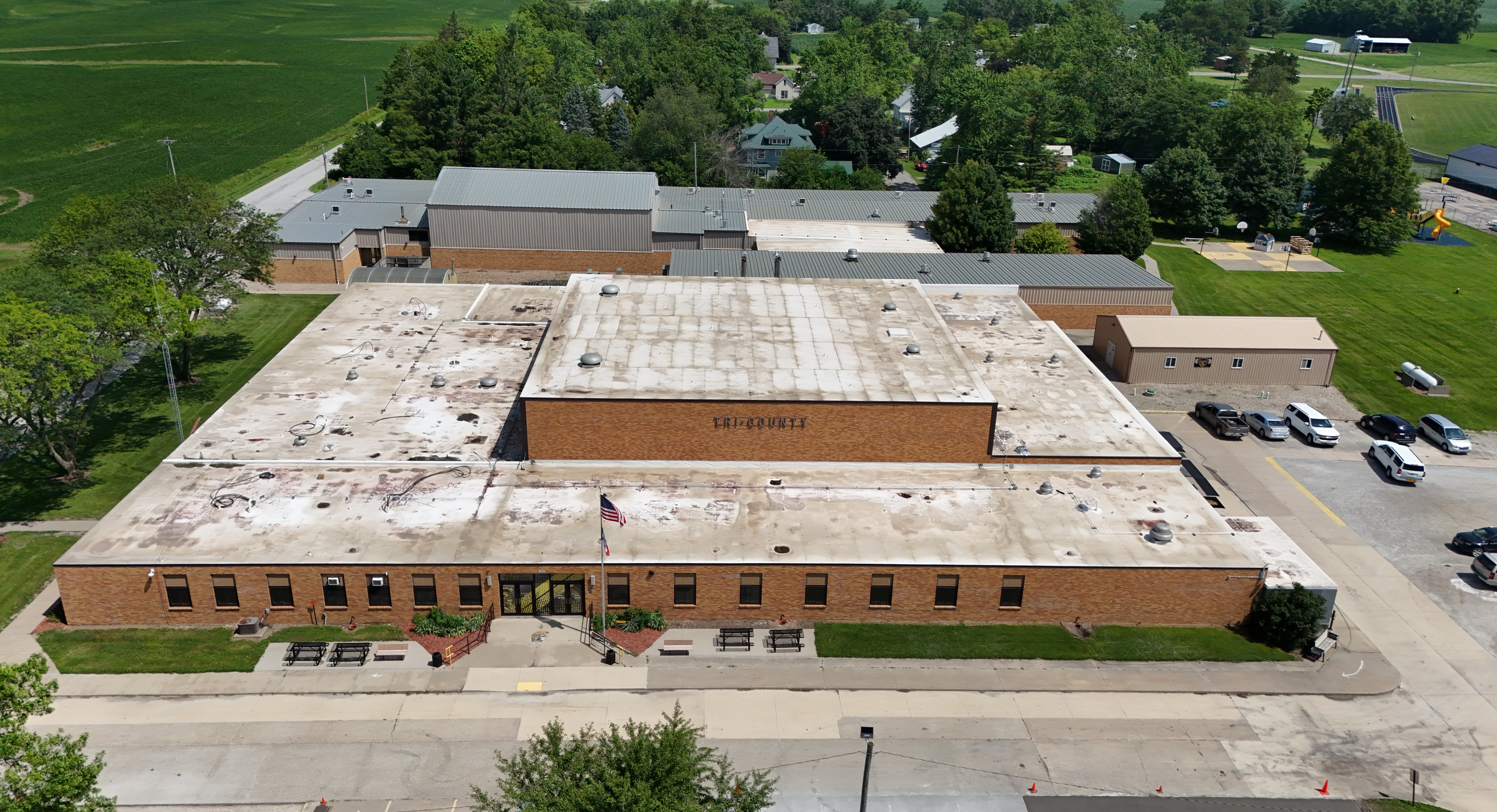
The school building in Thornburg

The district operates three schools on one campus in Thornburg:

- Tri-County Elementary School
- Tri-County Junior High School
- Tri-County High School

=== Tri-County High School ===
==== Athletics ====
The Tri-County Trojans compete in the South Iowa Cedar League Conference in the following sports:

- Volleyball (girls)
- Football (boys)
- Cross-Country (boys and girls)
- Basketball (boys and girls)
- Wrestling (boys and girls)
- Track and field (boys and girls)
- Golf (boys and girls)
- Baseball (boys)
- Softball (girls)
- Cheerleading (girls)

==== Performing Arts ====
- Speech and drama
- Pep and concert band
- Choir

== See also ==
- List of school districts in Iowa
- List of high schools in Iowa
