= Keswick, Iowa =

- City
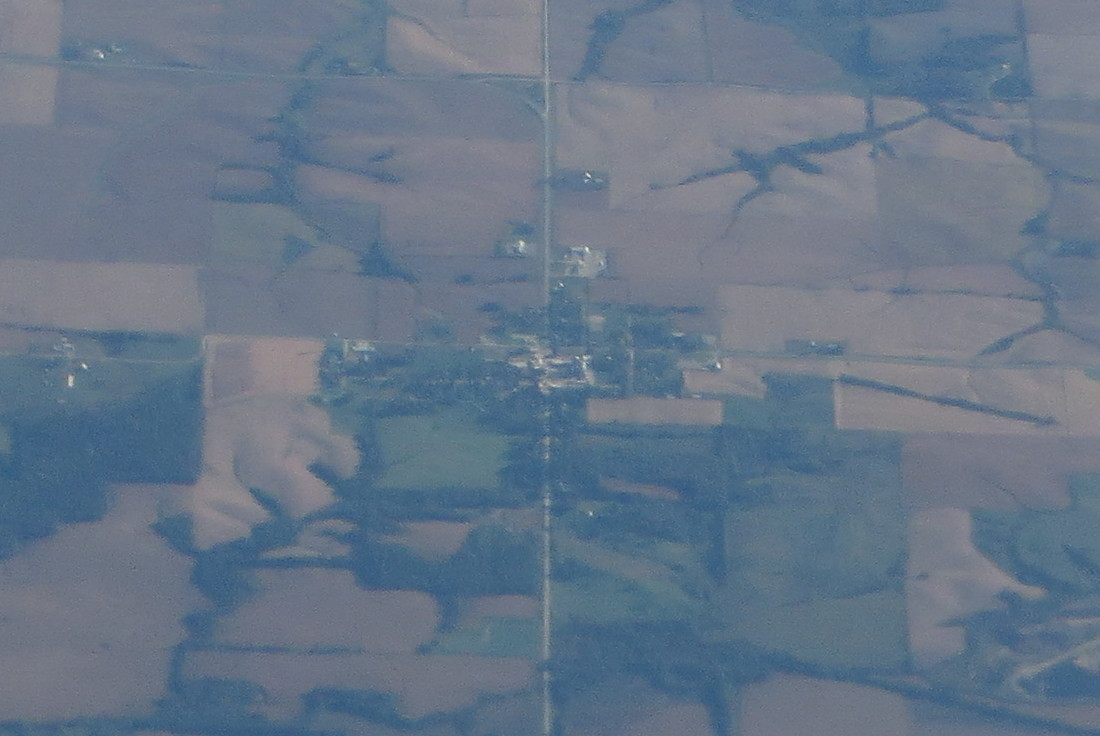
- Aerial photograph of Keswick

- Location of Keswick, Iowa
- Coordinates: 41°27′16″N 92°14′18″W
- Country: United States
- State: Iowa
- County: Keokuk

Area
  - Total: 0.45 sq mi (1.16 km^{2})
  - Land: 0.45 sq mi (1.16 km^{2})
  - Water: 0 sq mi (0.00 km^{2})
- Elevation: 873 ft (266 m)

Population (2020)
  - Total: 242
  - Density: 542.4/sq mi (209.44/km^{2})
- Time zone: UTC-6 (Central (CST))
  - Summer (DST): UTC-5 (CDT)
- ZIP code: 50136
- Area code: 319
- FIPS code: 19-41070
- GNIS feature ID: 2395521

Keswick is a city in Keokuk County, Iowa, United States. The population was 242 at the time of the 2020 census.

== History ==
The Burlington, Cedar Rapids and Northern Railway built a 66-mile branch to What Cheer via Keswick in 1879 The town is named for Keswick, England, the home town of a local woman who had offered lodging to the track-laying crew.

== Geography ==
According to the United States Census Bureau, the city has a total area of 0.43 square miles (1.11 km^{2}), all of it land.

== Demographics ==
Historical populations
| Year | Pop. | ±% |
|---|---|---|
| 1880 | 59 | — |
| 1920 | 354 | +500.0% |
| 1930 | 358 | +1.1% |
| 1940 | 307 | −14.2% |
| 1950 | 276 | −10.1% |
| 1960 | 265 | −4.0% |
| 1970 | 257 | −3.0% |
| 1980 | 300 | +16.7% |
| 1990 | 284 | −5.3% |
| 2000 | 295 | +3.9% |
| 2010 | 246 | −16.6% |
| 2020 | 242 | −1.6% |
Source:"U.S. Census website". United States Census Bureau. and Iowa Data Center; Source: U.S. Decennial Census

=== 2020 census ===
As of the census of 2020, there were 242 people, 92 households, and 59 families residing in the city. The population density was 542.4 inhabitants per square mile (209.4/km^{2}). There were 110 housing units at an average density of 246.6 per square mile (95.2/km^{2}). The racial makeup of the city was 94.6% White, 0.4% Black or African American, 0.0% Native American, 0.0% Asian, 0.0% Pacific Islander, 2.1% from other races and 2.9% from two or more races. Hispanic or Latino persons of any race comprised 2.5% of the population.

Of the 92 households, 26.1% of which had children under the age of 18 living with them, 55.4% were married couples living together, 9.8% were cohabitating couples, 15.2% had a female householder with no spouse or partner present and 19.6% had a male householder with no spouse or partner present. 35.9% of all households were non-families. 28.3% of all households were made up of individuals, 12.0% had someone living alone who was 65 years old or older.

The median age in the city was 37.5 years. 29.8% of the residents were under the age of 20; 5.4% were between the ages of 20 and 24; 22.7% were from 25 and 44; 20.7% were from 45 and 64; and 21.5% were 65 years of age or older. The gender makeup of the city was 48.8% male and 51.2% female.

=== 2010 census ===
As of the census of 2010, there were 246 people, 105 households, and 69 families residing in the city. The population density was 572.1 inhabitants per square mile (220.9/km^{2}). There were 118 housing units at an average density of 274.4 per square mile (105.9/km^{2}). The racial makeup of the city was 97.6% White, 1.2% Native American, and 1.2% from two or more races.

There were 105 households, of which 27.6% had children under the age of 18 living with them, 49.5% were married couples living together, 10.5% had a female householder with no husband present, 5.7% had a male householder with no wife present, and 34.3% were non-families. 28.6% of all households were made up of individuals, and 18.1% had someone living alone who was 65 years of age or older. The average household size was 2.34 and the average family size was 2.87.

The median age in the city was 38.3 years. 24% of residents were under the age of 18; 6.5% were between the ages of 18 and 24; 24.8% were from 25 to 44; 26% were from 45 to 64; and 18.7% were 65 years of age or older. The gender makeup of the city was 46.3% male and 53.7% female.

=== 2000 census ===
As of the census of 2000, there were 295 people, 115 households, and 86 families residing in the city. The population density was 674.2 inhabitants per square mile (260.3/km^{2}). There were 121 housing units at an average density of 276.6 per square mile (106.8/km^{2}). The racial makeup of the city was 98.98% White, 0.34% Asian, 0.68% from other races. Hispanic or Latino of any race were 0.68% of the population.

There were 115 households, out of which 32.2% had children under the age of 18 living with them, 60.9% were married couples living together, 9.6% had a female householder with no husband present, and 25.2% were non-families. 22.6% of all households were made up of individuals, and 16.5% had someone living alone who was 65 years of age or older. The average household size was 2.57 and the average family size was 2.93.

In the city, the population was spread out, with 28.5% under the age of 18, 5.4% from 18 to 24, 27.1% from 25 to 44, 20.7% from 45 to 64, and 18.3% who were 65 years of age or older. The median age was 37 years. For every 100 females, there were 87.9 males. For every 100 females age 18 and over, there were 88.4 males.

The median income for a household in the city was $31,354, and the median income for a family was $32,188. Males had a median income of $27,778 versus $22,143 for females. The per capita income for the city was $15,779. About 4.7% of families and 5.5% of the population were below the poverty line, including 4.9% of those under the age of eighteen and 10.5% of those 65 or over.

== Education ==
The Tri-County Community School District operates local area public schools.
