= East Lancaster Township, Keokuk County, Iowa =

Township in Keokuk County, Iowa, U.S.

East Lancaster Township
- Township
- Interactive map of East Lancaster Township
- Coordinates: 41°15′N 92°03′W
- Country: United States
- State: Iowa
- County: Keokuk

East Lancaster Township is a township in Keokuk County, Iowa, USA.
