= West Lancaster Township, Keokuk County, Iowa =

Township in Iowa, USA

Coordinates: 42°16′N 92°15′W

West Lancaster Township is a township in Keokuk County, Iowa.
