= Prairie Township, Keokuk County, Iowa =

Township in Keokuk County, Iowa, U.S.

Coordinates: 42°28′N 92°21′W

Prairie Township is a township in Keokuk County, Iowa, USA.
