= Keokuk County, Iowa =

County in Iowa, United States

- County
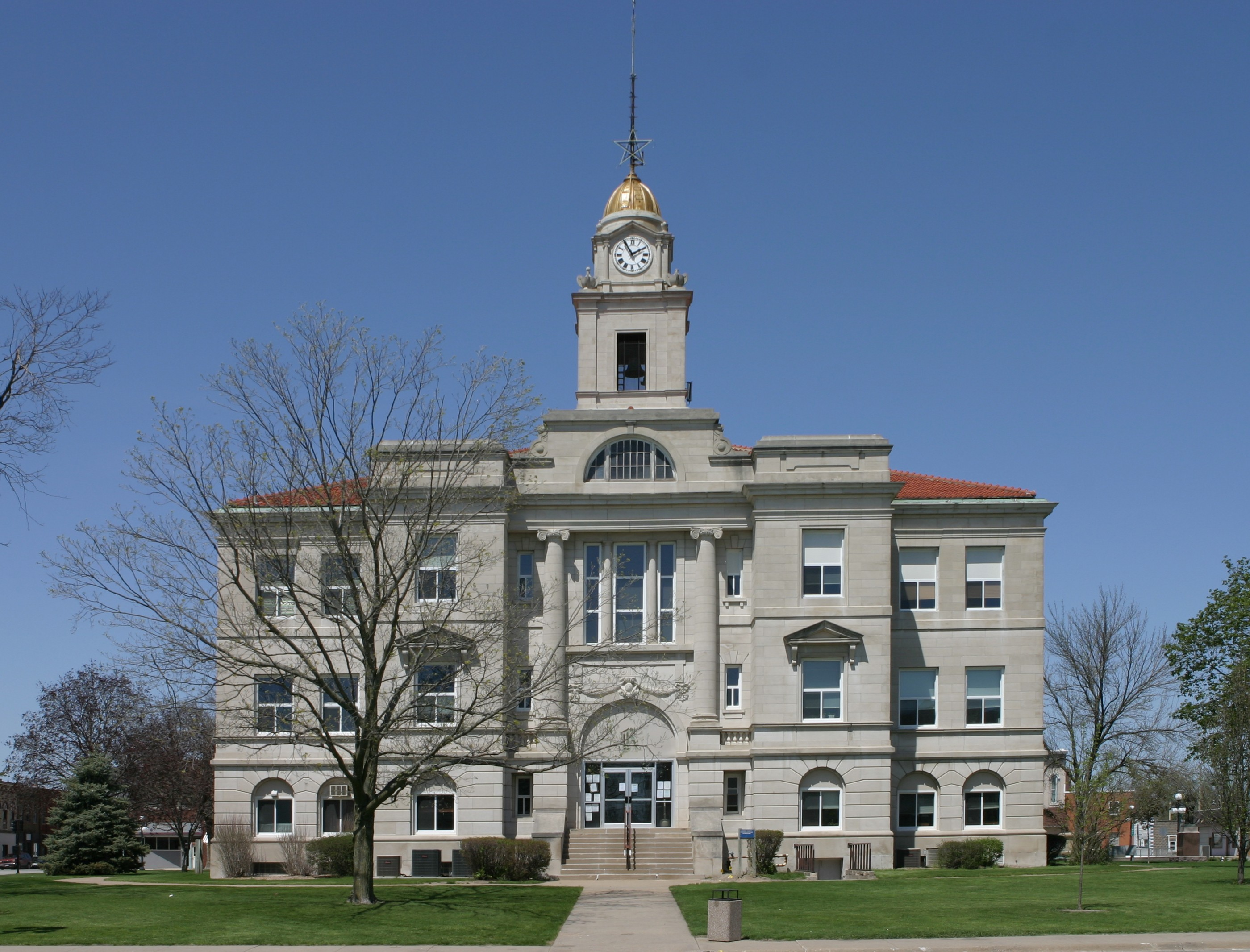
- The Courthouse in Sigourney is on the NRHP

- Location within the U.S. state of Iowa
- Coordinates: 41.331182°N 92.167721°W
- Country: United States
- State: Iowa
- Founded: February 17, 1843
- Named for: Keokuk (Sauk leader)
- Seat: Sigourney
- Largest city: Sigourney

Area
  - Total: 579.926 sq mi (1,502.00 km^{2})
  - Land: 579.175 sq mi (1,500.06 km^{2})
  - Water: 0.751 sq mi (1.95 km^{2}) 0.13%

Population (2020)
  - Total: 10,033
  - Estimate (2025): 9,797 ▼
  - Density: 17.323/sq mi (6.6884/km^{2})
- Time zone: UTC−6 (Central)
  - Summer (DST): UTC−5 (CDT)
- Congressional district: 2nd
- Website: keokukcounty.iowa.gov
- Iowa county number 54

Keokuk County is a county located in the U.S. state of Iowa. As of the 2020 census, the population was 10,033, and was estimated to be 9,797 in 2025. The county seat and the largest city is Sigourney.

== History ==
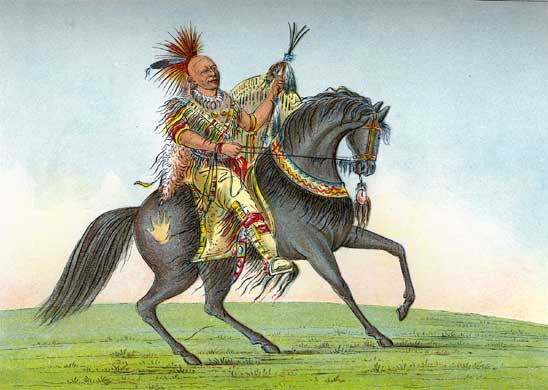
Keokuk (Sauk chief) by George Catlin

Keokuk County was formed in 1837. It was named for Keokuk, the leader of the Sauk tribe, who advocated peace with the white settlers. In May 1843, the county opened for public settlement, with its judicial and regulatory duties assigned to the existing Washington County. Its governing structure was created in 1844, although the seat was not decided (for Sigourney) until 1856.

Keokuk County is unusual in that it has two county fairs. The Keokuk County Fair is held in What Cheer and immediately followed by the Keokuk County Expo which is held 8.9 miles east-southeast in Sigourney.

The Keokuk County Courthouse was built in 1911, in Sigourney's Public Square Historic District. It has been listed on the National Register of Historic Places since 1981.

== Geography ==
According to the United States Census Bureau, the county has a total area of 580 square miles (1,500 km^{2}), of which 579 square miles (1,500 km^{2}) is land and 0.7 square miles (1.8 km^{2}) (0.1%) is water. The South Branch of the Skunk River drains the topography, flowing eastward through the lower portion of the county.

=== Major highways ===
- Iowa Highway 1
- Iowa Highway 21
- Iowa Highway 22
- Iowa Highway 78
- Iowa Highway 92
- Iowa Highway 149

=== Adjacent counties ===
- Poweshiek County − northwest
- Iowa County − north
- Washington County − east
- Jefferson County − southeast
- Wapello County − southwest
- Mahaska County − west

== Demographics ==
Historical population
Census	Pop.	Note	%±
1850	4,822		—
1860	13,271		175.2%
1870	19,434		46.4%
1880	21,258		9.4%
1890	23,862		12.2%
1900	24,979		4.7%
1910	21,160		−15.3%
1920	20,983		−0.8%
1930	19,148		−8.7%
1940	18,406		−3.9%
1950	16,797		−8.7%
1960	15,492		−7.8%
1970	13,943		−10.0%
1980	12,921		−7.3%
1990	11,624		−10.0%
2000	11,400		−1.9%
2010	10,511		−7.8%
2020	10,033		−4.5%
2025 (est.)	9,797	▼	−2.4%
U.S. Decennial Census; 1790–1960 1900–1990; 1990–2000 2010–2020

=== 2020 census ===
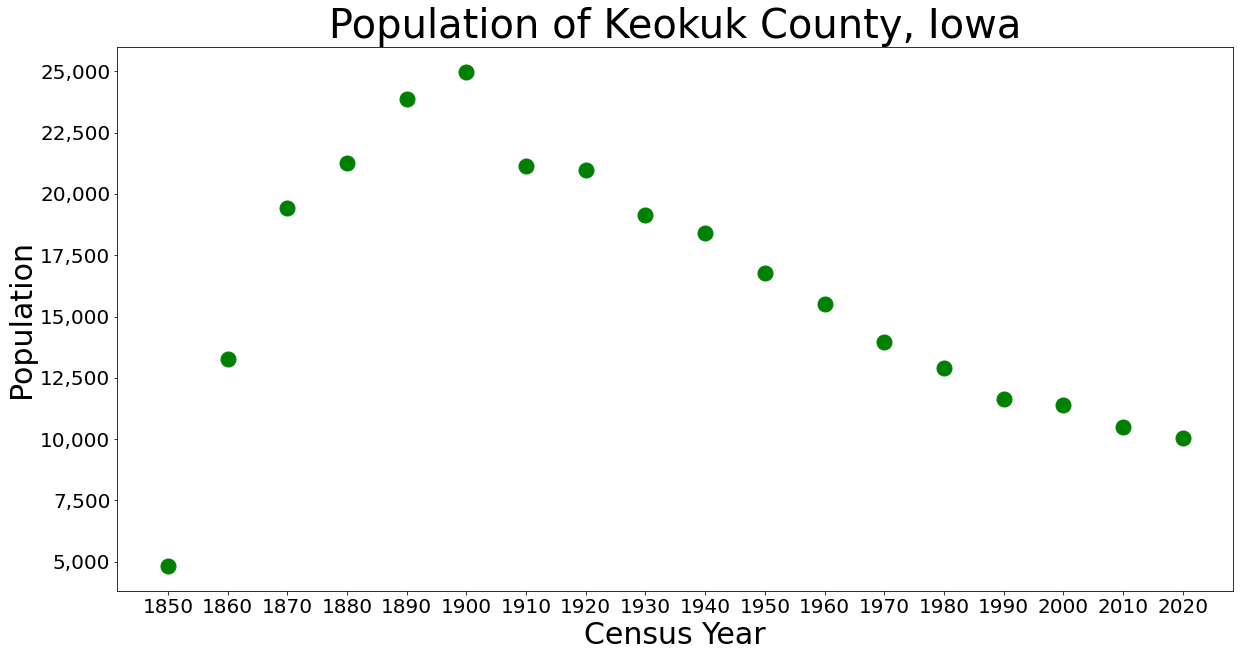
Population of Keokuk County from the U.S. census data

As of the 2020 census, the county had a population of 10,033, with a population density of 17.3/sq mi (6.7/km^{2}). 96.81% of the population reported being of one race.

The median age was 43.5 years. 23.7% of residents were under the age of 18 and 21.7% of residents were 65 years of age or older. For every 100 females there were 102.4 males, and for every 100 females age 18 and over there were 100.4 males age 18 and over.

The racial makeup of the county was 95.2% White, 0.5% Black or African American, 0.1% American Indian and Alaska Native, 0.2% Asian, <0.1% Native Hawaiian and Pacific Islander, 0.8% from some other race, and 3.2% from two or more races. Hispanic or Latino residents of any race comprised 2.1% of the population.

There were 4,174 households in the county, of which 27.2% had children under the age of 18 living in them. Of all households, 51.4% were married-couple households, 20.0% were households with a male householder and no spouse or partner present, and 21.2% were households with a female householder and no spouse or partner present. About 30.1% of all households were made up of individuals and 15.4% had someone living alone who was 65 years of age or older.

There were 4,654 housing units, of which 10.3% were vacant. Among occupied housing units, 79.1% were owner-occupied and 20.9% were renter-occupied. The homeowner vacancy rate was 1.4% and the rental vacancy rate was 8.3%.

<0.1% of residents lived in urban areas, while 100.0% lived in rural areas.

=== 2010 census ===
The 2010 census recorded a population of 10,511 in the county, with a population density of 18.1/sq mi (7.0/km^{2}). There were 4,931 housing units, of which 4,408 were occupied.

=== 2000 census ===
As of the 2000 census, there were 11,400 people, 4,586 households, and 3,155 families in the county. The population density was 20 people per square mile (7.7 people/km^{2}). There were 5,013 housing units at an average density of 9 units per square mile (3.5 units/km^{2}). The racial makeup of the county was 99.00% White, 0.07% Black or African American, 0.11% Native American, 0.23% Asian, 0.02% Pacific Islander, 0.21% from other races, and 0.36% from two or more races. 0.54% of the population were Hispanic or Latino of any race.

There were 4,586 households, out of which 30.50% had children under the age of 18 living with them, 59.00% were married couples living together, 6.50% had a female householder with no husband present, and 31.20% were non-families. 27.80% of all households were made up of individuals, and 15.80% had someone living alone who was 65 years of age or older. The average household size was 2.45 and the average family size was 2.99.

The county population contained 25.70% under the age of 18, 7.00% from 18 to 24, 25.50% from 25 to 44, 21.60% from 45 to 64, and 20.20% who were 65 years of age or older. The median age was 40 years. For every 100 females there were 94.10 males. For every 100 females age 18 and over, there were 91.80 males.

The median income for a household in the county was $34,025, and the median income for a family was $41,818. Males had a median income of $28,306 versus $22,083 for females. The per capita income for the county was $17,120. About 7.50% of families and 10.10% of the population were below the poverty line, including 12.90% of those under age 18 and 10.50% of those age 65 or over.

== Politics ==
For most of its history, Keokuk County has backed Republican Party candidates in presidential elections, with Democratic Party candidates only winning the county in eight presidential elections from 1896 on. Bill Clinton is the most recent Democratic presidential candidate to win the county (1996), while in 2016 his wife, Hillary Clinton, had the worst performance by a Democrat since 1924, only winning 26.9 percent of the vote. 2016 Republican candidate Donald Trump made a significant gain compared to his party's 2012 candidate Mitt Romney.

United States presidential election results for Keokuk County, Iowa
Year	Republican		Democratic		Third party(ies)	
Year	No.	%	No.	%	No.	%
1896	3,166	50.72%	2,891	46.32%	185	2.96%
1900	3,339	54.32%	2,669	43.42%	139	2.26%
1904	3,079	55.82%	2,172	39.38%	265	4.80%
1908	2,728	50.71%	2,459	45.71%	193	3.59%
1912	1,361	26.07%	2,434	46.63%	1,425	27.30%
1916	2,822	52.18%	2,486	45.97%	100	1.85%
1920	6,207	67.95%	2,800	30.65%	128	1.40%
1924	4,795	51.36%	2,568	27.51%	1,973	21.13%
1928	5,304	58.23%	3,772	41.41%	32	0.35%
1932	3,442	36.74%	5,839	62.32%	88	0.94%
1936	4,491	45.46%	5,162	52.26%	225	2.28%
1940	5,394	54.00%	4,552	45.57%	42	0.42%
1944	4,644	53.96%	3,900	45.32%	62	0.72%
1948	4,201	49.57%	4,118	48.59%	156	1.84%
1952	5,712	64.20%	3,135	35.24%	50	0.56%
1956	4,680	56.13%	3,649	43.76%	9	0.11%
1960	4,697	57.88%	3,408	42.00%	10	0.12%
1964	2,597	35.08%	4,790	64.69%	17	0.23%
1968	3,588	53.26%	2,807	41.67%	342	5.08%
1972	3,831	58.35%	2,619	39.89%	115	1.75%
1976	2,920	44.90%	3,482	53.54%	102	1.57%
1980	3,145	52.64%	2,390	40.00%	440	7.36%
1984	2,913	51.50%	2,649	46.84%	94	1.66%
1988	2,278	43.56%	2,899	55.43%	53	1.01%
1992	1,981	35.52%	2,329	41.76%	1,267	22.72%
1996	2,080	40.78%	2,545	49.89%	476	9.33%
2000	2,571	51.97%	2,181	44.09%	195	3.94%
2004	3,119	56.92%	2,294	41.86%	67	1.22%
2008	2,712	50.58%	2,518	46.96%	132	2.46%
2012	2,843	53.99%	2,303	43.73%	120	2.28%
2016	3,390	68.00%	1,342	26.92%	253	5.08%
2020	3,797	71.60%	1,414	26.66%	92	1.73%
2024	3,869	75.13%	1,219	23.67%	62	1.20%

== Communities ==
=== Cities ===
- Delta
- Gibson
- Harper
- Hayesville
- Hedrick
- Keota
- Keswick
- Kinross
- Martinsburg
- North English (partial)
- Ollie
- Richland
- Sigourney
- South English
- Thornburg
- Webster
- What Cheer

=== Unincorporated communities ===
- Atwood
- Coal Creek
- Hinkletown
- Pekin (partial)
- Talleyrand
- Tilton

=== Townships ===
- Adams
- Benton
- Clear Creek
- East Lancaster
- English River
- Jackson
- Lafayette
- Liberty
- Plank
- Prairie
- Richland
- Sigourney
- Steady Run
- Van Buren
- Warren
- Washington
- West Lancaster

=== Population ranking ===
The population ranking of the following table is based on the 2020 census of Keokuk County.

† county seat

Rank	City/Town/etc.	Municipal type	Population (2020 Census)
1	† Sigourney	City	2,004
2	North English (mostly in Iowa County)	City	1,065
3	Keota	City	897
4	Hedrick	City	728
5	What Cheer	City	607
6	Richland	City	542
7	Keswick	City	242
8	South English	City	202
9	Ollie	City	201
10	Harper	City	118
11	Martinsburg	City	110
12	Webster	City	94
13	Kinross	City	80
14	Thornburg	City	45
15	Hayesville	City	41

== Education ==
School districts include:

- Eddyville–Blakesburg–Fremont Community School District, Eddyville – Formed on July 1, 2012.
- English Valleys Community School District, North English
- Keota Community School District, Keota
- Pekin Community School District, Packwood
- Sigourney Community School District, Sigourney
- Tri-County Community School District, Thornburg

Former school districts:

- Fremont Community School District, Fremont - Merged into Eddyville-Blakesburg-Fremont on July 1, 2012.
- Hedrick Community School District, Hedrick – Involuntarily dissolved on July 1, 1991.

== See also ==
- National Register of Historic Places listings in Keokuk County, Iowa
