= North English, Iowa =

- City
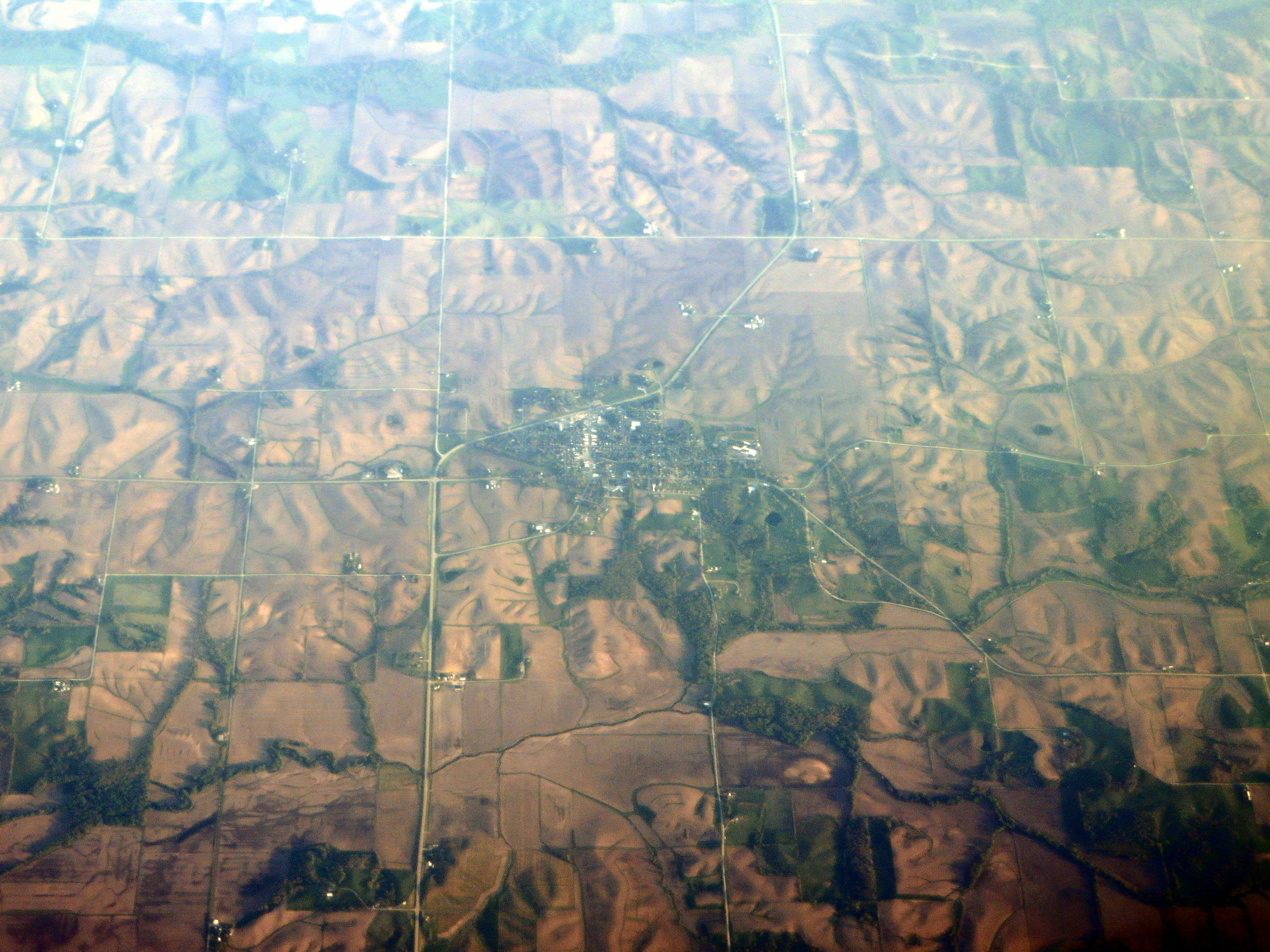
- Aerial view of North English

- Location of North English, Iowa
- Coordinates: 41°31′00″N 92°04′40″W
- Country: United States
- State: Iowa
- Counties: Iowa, Keokuk

Area
  - Total: 0.61 sq mi (1.57 km^{2})
  - Land: 0.61 sq mi (1.57 km^{2})
  - Water: 0 sq mi (0.00 km^{2})
- Elevation: 820 ft (250 m)

Population (2020)
  - Total: 1,065
  - Density: 1,754.7/sq mi (677.48/km^{2})
- Time zone: UTC-6 (Central (CST))
  - Summer (DST): UTC-5 (CDT)
- ZIP code: 52316
- Area code: 319
- FIPS code: 19-57225
- GNIS feature ID: 2395254
- Website: www.northenglishia.org

North English is a city located mainly in Iowa county with a small portion in Keokuk county in the U.S. state of Iowa. The population was 1,065 at the time of the 2020 census. It is named for the English River.

== History ==
North English was laid out in 1855; it was originally called Nevada.

== Geography ==
According to the United States Census Bureau, the city has a total area of 0.55 square miles (1.42 km^{2}), all land.

== Demographics ==
Historical populations
Year	Pop.	±%
1900	683	—
1910	848	+24.2%
1920	933	+10.0%
1930	780	−16.4%
1940	865	+10.9%
1950	853	−1.4%
1960	1,004	+17.7%
1970	965	−3.9%
1980	990	+2.6%
1990	944	−4.6%
2000	991	+5.0%
2010	1,041	+5.0%
2020	1,065	+2.3%
Source:"U.S. Census website". United States Census Bureau. and Iowa Data Center; Source: U.S. Decennial Census

=== 2020 census ===
As of the 2020 census, there were 1,065 people, 430 households, and 255 families residing in the city. The population density was 1,754.7 inhabitants per square mile (677.5/km^{2}). There were 461 housing units at an average density of 759.5 per square mile (293.3/km^{2}).

The median age was 37.9 years. 28.1% of residents were under the age of 18. For every 100 females there were 84.9 males, and for every 100 females age 18 and over there were 77.7 males age 18 and over. 30.4% of the residents were under the age of 20; 4.4% were between the ages of 20 and 24; 21.4% were from 25 to 44; 24.3% were from 45 to 64; and 19.4% were 65 years of age or older. The gender makeup of the city was 45.9% male and 54.1% female.

0.0% of residents lived in urban areas, while 100.0% lived in rural areas.

Of the 430 households, 34.7% had children under the age of 18 living with them. 42.3% were married-couple households, 10.0% were cohabitating couples, 32.1% had a female householder with no spouse or partner present, and 15.6% had a male householder with no spouse or partner present. 40.7% of all households were non-families. 34.9% of all households were made up of individuals, and 18.8% had someone living alone who was 65 years of age or older.

Of all housing units, 6.7% were vacant. The homeowner vacancy rate was 2.2% and the rental vacancy rate was 3.9%.

Racial composition as of the 2020 census
Race	Number	Percent
White	990	93.0%
Black or African American	10	0.9%
American Indian and Alaska Native	3	0.3%
Asian	5	0.5%
Native Hawaiian and Other Pacific Islander	0	0.0%
Some other race	9	0.8%
Two or more races	48	4.5%
Hispanic or Latino (of any race)	54	5.1%

=== 2010 census ===
As of the census of 2010, there were 1,041 people, 444 households, and 276 families living in the city. The population density was 1,892.7 inhabitants per square mile (730.8/km^{2}). There were 484 housing units at an average density of 880.0 per square mile (339.8/km^{2}). The racial makeup of the city was 99.2% White, 0.3% African American, and 0.5% from two or more races. Hispanic or Latino of any race were 0.7% of the population.

There were 444 households, of which 29.7% had children under the age of 18 living with them, 45.5% were married couples living together, 13.1% had a female householder with no husband present, 3.6% had a male householder with no wife present, and 37.8% were non-families. 35.4% of all households were made up of individuals, and 18.1% had someone living alone who was 65 years of age or older. The average household size was 2.23 and the average family size was 2.86.

The median age in the city was 41.7 years. 24.9% of residents were under the age of 18; 5.6% were between the ages of 18 and 24; 23% were from 25 to 44; 23.3% were from 45 to 64; and 23.2% were 65 years of age or older. The gender makeup of the city was 45.7% male and 54.3% female.

=== 2000 census ===
As of the census of 2000, there were 991 people, 408 households, and 255 families living in the city. The population density was 1,784.2 inhabitants per square mile (688.9/km^{2}). There were 449 housing units at an average density of 808.4 per square mile (312.1/km^{2}). The racial makeup of the city was 98.99% White, 0.10% African American, 0.30% Native American, 0.10% Asian, and 0.50% from two or more races. Hispanic or Latino of any race were 1.01% of the population.

There were 408 households, out of which 28.2% had children under the age of 18 living with them, 50.5% were married couples living together, 9.8% had a female householder with no husband present, and 37.3% were non-families. 33.6% of all households were made up of individuals, and 17.6% had someone living alone who was 65 years of age or older. The average household size was 2.29 and the average family size was 2.94.

Age spread: 22.5% under the age of 18, 7.0% from 18 to 24, 24.4% from 25 to 44, 18.2% from 45 to 64, and 28.0% who were 65 years of age or older. The median age was 42 years. For every 100 females, there were 84.5 males. For every 100 females age 18 and over, there were 77.4 males.

The median income for a household in the city was $32,639, and the median income for a family was $43,162. Males had a median income of $31,480 versus $23,563 for females. The per capita income for the city was $16,158. About 5.9% of families and 8.2% of the population were below the poverty line, including 8.8% of those under age 18 and 7.6% of those age 65 or over.

== Schools ==
North English is located within the English Valleys Community School District. Schools include:

- English Valleys Elementary School
- English Valleys Jr/Sr High School

== Notable person ==
- Mace Brown, born in North English, was a relief pitcher in Major League Baseball
