= Plank Township, Keokuk County, Iowa =

Township in Keokuk County, Iowa, U.S.

Coordinates: 42°22′N 92°07′W

Plank Township is a township in Keokuk County, Iowa, USA.
