= Van Buren Township, Keokuk County, Iowa =

Township in Iowa, USA

Coordinates: 42°23′N 92°14′W

Van Buren Township is a township in Keokuk County, Iowa, USA.
