= Cedar Township, Mahaska County, Iowa =

Township in Iowa, USA

Coordinates: 41°12′N 92°28′W

Cedar Township is a township in Mahaska County, Iowa, United States.
