= Benton Township, Keokuk County, Iowa =

Township in Keokuk County, Iowa, U.S.

Coordinates: 42°12′N 92°21′W

Benton Township is a township in Keokuk County, Iowa, United States.
