= Thornburg, Iowa =

- City
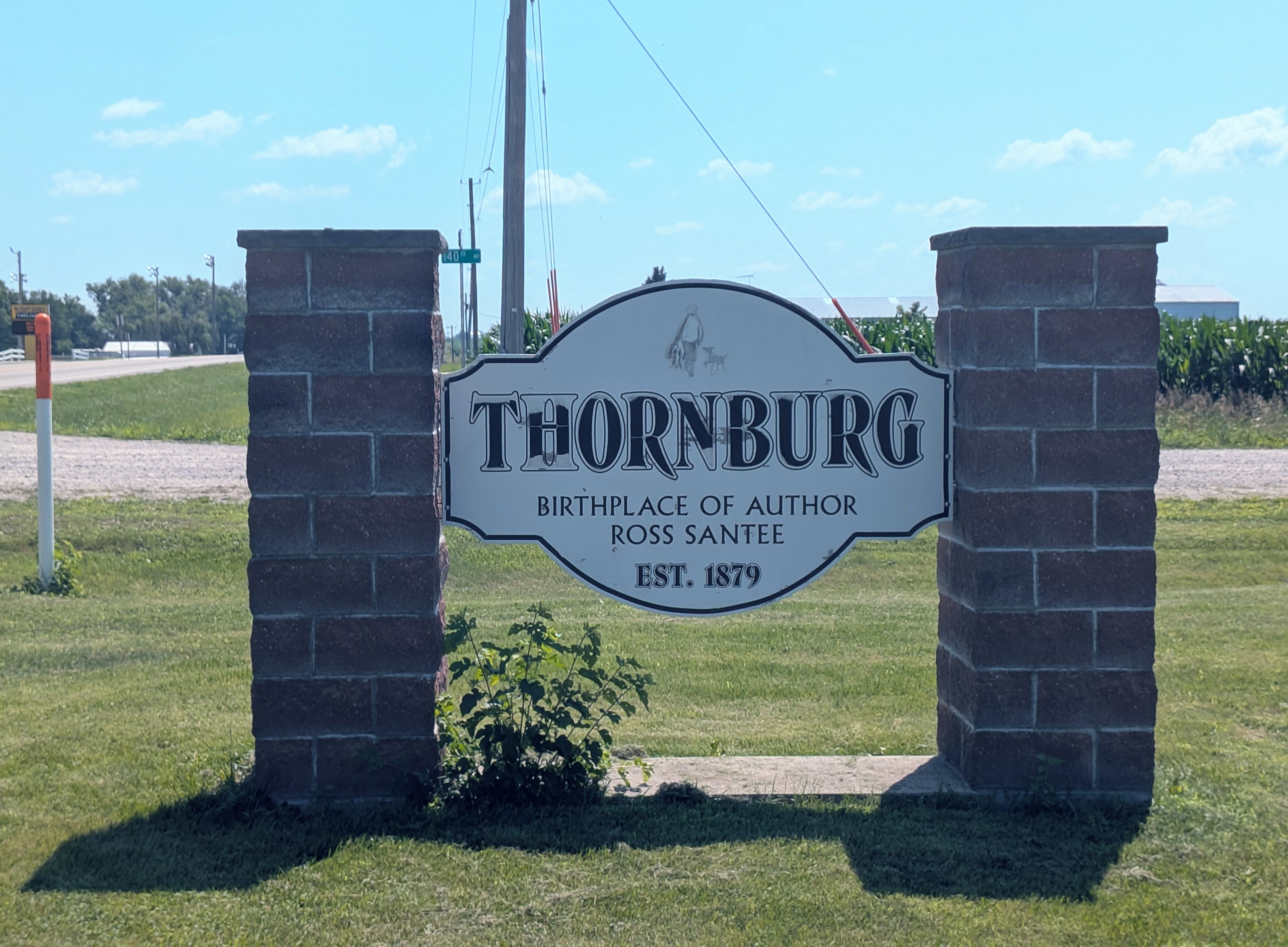
- Thornburg's welcome sign

- Location of Thornburg, Iowa
- Coordinates: 41°27′21″N 92°19′56″W
- Country: United States
- State: Iowa
- County: Keokuk

Area
  - Total: 0.20 sq mi (0.52 km^{2})
  - Land: 0.20 sq mi (0.52 km^{2})
  - Water: 0 sq mi (0.00 km^{2})
- Elevation: 879 ft (268 m)

Population (2020)
  - Total: 45
  - Density: 226.0/sq mi (87.26/km^{2})
- Time zone: UTC-6 (Central (CST))
  - Summer (DST): UTC-5 (CDT)
- ZIP code: 50255
- Area code: 641
- FIPS code: 19-77835
- GNIS feature ID: 2397020

Thornburg is a city in Keokuk County, Iowa, United States. The population was 45 at the time of the 2020 census. Its sole enterprise is the Tri-County Community School, a public school serving grades K-12.

== History ==
The Burlington, Cedar Rapids and Northern Railway built a 66-mile branch to What Cheer via Thornburg in 1879. The town was founded by the railroad and named in memory of Major Thomas T. Thornburgh, who died in the Meeker Massacre. By 1881, Thornburg was at the junction of the line to What Cheer and a branch to Montezuma.

== Geography ==
According to the United States Census Bureau, the city has a total area of 0.20 square miles (0.52 km^{2}), all of it land.

== Demographics ==
Historical populations
Year	Pop.	±%
1880	65	—
1900	267	+310.8%
1910	233	−12.7%
1920	197	−15.5%
1930	171	−13.2%
1940	184	+7.6%
1950	138	−25.0%
1960	101	−26.8%
1970	98	−3.0%
1980	103	+5.1%
1990	91	−11.7%
2000	84	−7.7%
2010	67	−20.2%
2020	45	−32.8%
Source:"U.S. Census website". United States Census Bureau. and Iowa Data Center; Source: U.S. Decennial Census

=== 2020 census ===
As of the census of 2020, there were 45 people, 22 households, and 17 families residing in the city. The population density was 226.0 inhabitants per square mile (87.3/km^{2}). There were 24 housing units at an average density of 120.5 per square mile (46.5/km^{2}). The racial makeup of the city was 97.8% White, 2.2% Black or African American, 0.0% Native American, 0.0% Asian, 0.0% Pacific Islander, 0.0% from other races and 0.0% from two or more races. Hispanic or Latino persons of any race comprised 0.0% of the population.

Of the 22 households, 45.5% of which had children under the age of 18 living with them, 68.2% were married couples living together, 4.5% were cohabitating couples, 13.6% had a female householder with no spouse or partner present and 13.6% had a male householder with no spouse or partner present. 22.7% of all households were non-families. 18.2% of all households were made up of individuals, 13.6% had someone living alone who was 65 years old or older.

The median age in the city was 46.8 years. 17.8% of the residents were under the age of 20; 2.2% were between the ages of 20 and 24; 26.7% were from 25 and 44; 35.6% were from 45 and 64; and 17.8% were 65 years of age or older. The gender makeup of the city was 55.6% male and 44.4% female.

=== 2010 census ===
At the 2010 census there were 67 people, 27 households, and 20 families living in the city. The population density was 335.0 inhabitants per square mile (129.3/km^{2}). There were 29 housing units at an average density of 145.0 per square mile (56.0/km^{2}). The racial makup of the city was 100.0% White. Hispanic or Latino of any race were 1.5%.

Of the 27 households 25.9% had children under the age of 18 living with them, 55.6% were married couples living together, 14.8% had a female householder with no husband present, 3.7% had a male householder with no wife present, and 25.9% were non-families. 22.2% of households were one person and 7.4% were one person aged 65 or older. The average household size was 2.48 and the average family size was 2.80.

The median age was 42.5 years. 22.4% of residents were under the age of 18; 7.6% were between the ages of 18 and 24; 21% were from 25 to 44; 34.3% were from 45 to 64; and 14.9% were 65 or older. The gender makeup of the city was 46.3% male and 53.7% female.

=== 2000 census ===
As of the census of 2000, there were 84 people, 33 households, and 22 families living in the city. The population density was 426.9 inhabitants per square mile (164.8/km^{2}). There were 36 housing units at an average density of 183.0 per square mile (70.7/km^{2}). The racial makup of the city was 100.00% White.

Of the 33 households 30.3% had children under the age of 18 living with them, 60.6% were married couples living together, 3.0% had a female householder with no husband present, and 33.3% were non-families. 27.3% of households were one person and 12.1% were one person aged 65 or older. The average household size was 2.55 and the average family size was 3.14.

The age distribution was 19.0% under the age of 18, 16.7% from 18 to 24, 28.6% from 25 to 44, 22.6% from 45 to 64, and 13.1% 65 or older. The median age was 40 years. For every 100 females, there were 115.4 males. For every 100 females age 18 and over, there were 119.4 males.

The median household income was $45,313 and the median family income was $42,500. Males had a median income of $26,250 versus $20,536 for females. The per capita income for the city was $15,954. There were 9.1% of families and 4.9% of the population living below the poverty line, including no under eighteens and 50.0% of those over 64.

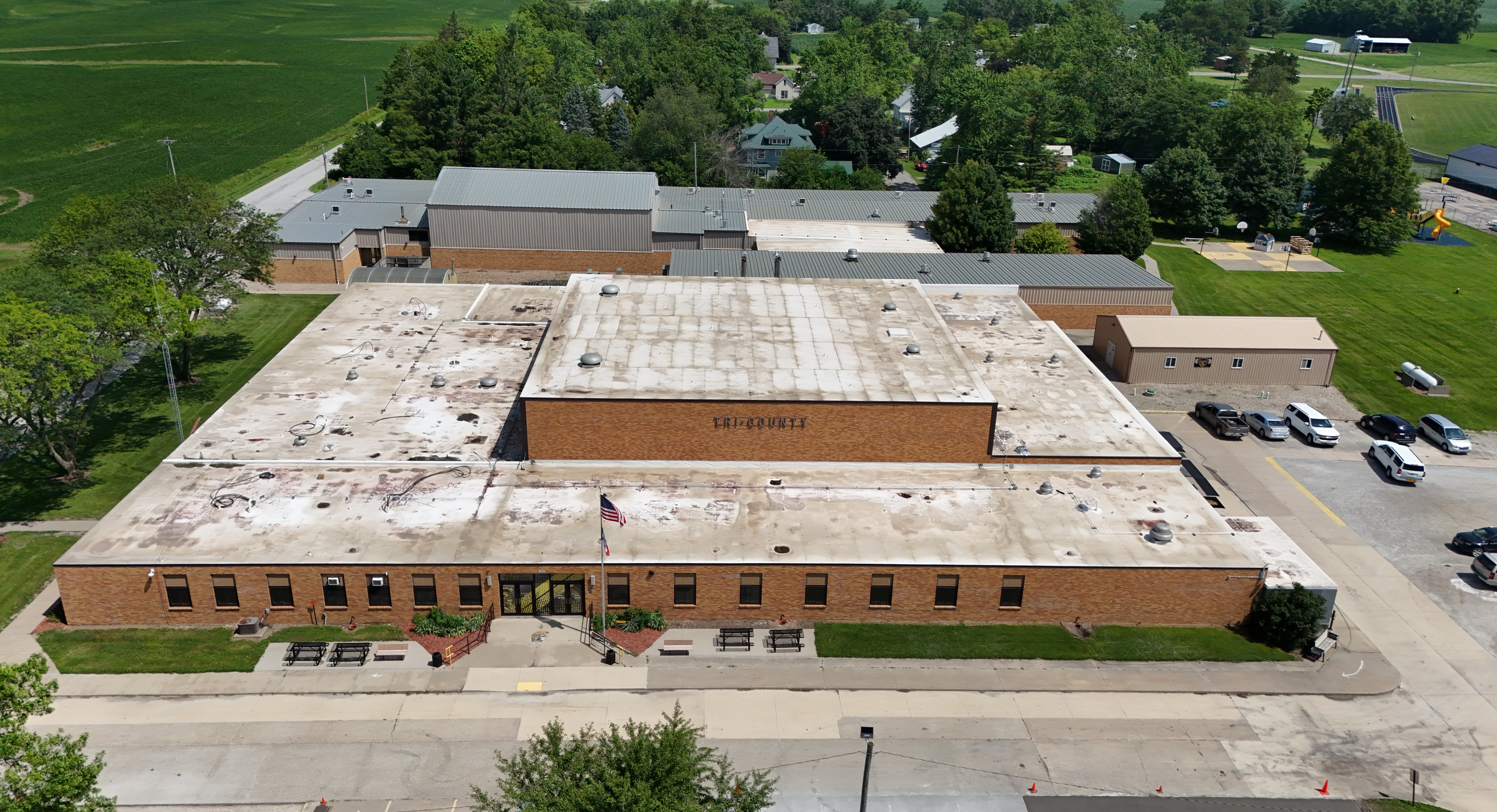
Tri-County Community School

== Education ==
The Tri-County Community School District operates local area public schools.
