= Webster, Iowa =

- City
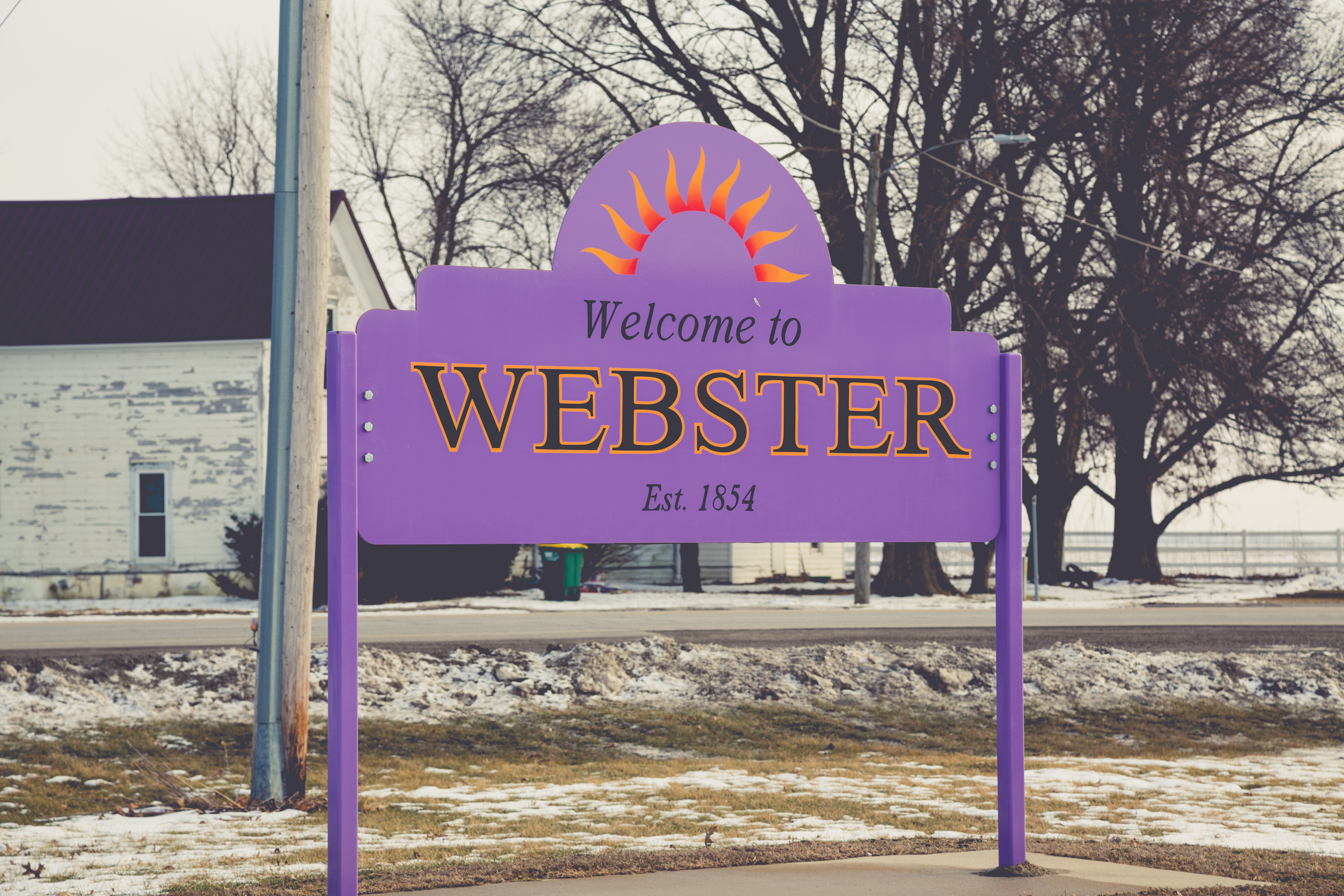
- Welcome sign in Webster

- Location of Webster, Iowa
- Coordinates: 41°26′18″N 92°10′18″W
- Country: United States
- State: Iowa
- County: Keokuk

Area
  - Total: 0.27 sq mi (0.71 km^{2})
  - Land: 0.27 sq mi (0.71 km^{2})
  - Water: 0 sq mi (0.00 km^{2})
- Elevation: 856 ft (261 m)

Population (2020)
  - Total: 94
  - Density: 344.1/sq mi (132.85/km^{2})
- Time zone: UTC-6 (Central (CST))
  - Summer (DST): UTC-5 (CDT)
- ZIP code: 52355
- Area code: 319
- FIPS code: 19-83055
- GNIS feature ID: 2397241

Webster is a city in Keokuk County, Iowa, United States. The population was 94 at the time of the 2020 census.

== Geography ==
According to the United States Census Bureau, the city has a total area of 0.32 square miles (0.83 km^{2}), all of it land.

== Demographics ==
Historical populations
Year	Pop.	±%
1880	73	—
1910	127	+74.0%
1920	172	+35.4%
1930	178	+3.5%
1940	165	−7.3%
1950	136	−17.6%
1960	137	+0.7%
1970	130	−5.1%
1980	124	−4.6%
1990	103	−16.9%
2000	110	+6.8%
2010	88	−20.0%
2020	94	+6.8%
Source:"U.S. Census website". United States Census Bureau. and Iowa Data Center; Source: U.S. Decennial Census

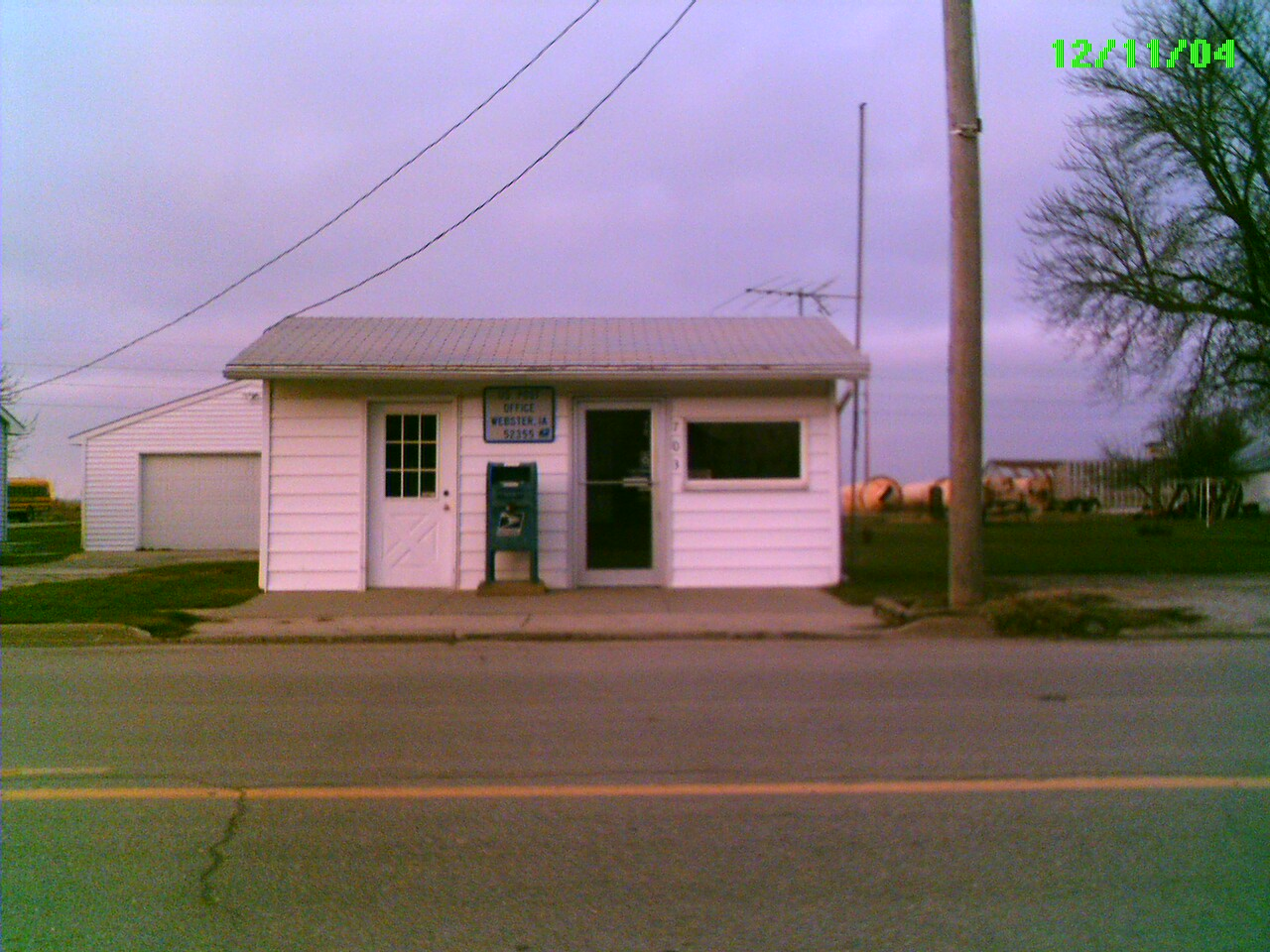
Post Office in Webster closed in 2011

=== 2020 census ===
As of the census of 2020, there were 94 people, 47 households, and 37 families residing in the city. The population density was 344.1 inhabitants per square mile (132.9/km^{2}). There were 47 housing units at an average density of 172.0 per square mile (66.4/km^{2}). The racial makeup of the city was 93.6% White, 0.0% Black or African American, 0.0% Native American, 0.0% Asian, 0.0% Pacific Islander, 2.1% from other races and 4.3% from two or more races. Hispanic or Latino persons of any race comprised 4.3% of the population.

Of the 47 households, 29.8% of which had children under the age of 18 living with them, 53.2% were married couples living together, 14.9% were cohabitating couples, 14.9% had a female householder with no spouse or partner present and 17.0% had a male householder with no spouse or partner present. 21.3% of all households were non-families. 17.0% of all households were made up of individuals, 8.5% had someone living alone who was 65 years old or older.

The median age in the city was 46.5 years. 21.3% of the residents were under the age of 20; 5.3% were between the ages of 20 and 24; 22.3% were from 25 and 44; 36.2% were from 45 and 64; and 14.9% were 65 years of age or older. The gender makeup of the city was 52.1% male and 47.9% female.

=== 2010 census ===
As of the census of 2010, there were 88 people, 41 households, and 24 families living in the city. The population density was 275.0 inhabitants per square mile (106.2/km^{2}). There were 50 housing units at an average density of 156.3 per square mile (60.3/km^{2}). The racial makeup of the city was 100.0% White. Hispanic or Latino of any race were 4.5% of the population.

There were 41 households, of which 22.0% had children under the age of 18 living with them, 53.7% were married couples living together, 4.9% had a male householder with no wife present, and 41.5% were non-families. 34.1% of all households were made up of individuals, and 9.8% had someone living alone who was 65 years of age or older. The average household size was 2.15 and the average family size was 2.71.

The median age in the city was 43.5 years. 17% of residents were under the age of 18; 10.2% were between the ages of 18 and 24; 23.9% were from 25 to 44; 34.1% were from 45 to 64; and 14.8% were 65 years of age or older. The gender makeup of the city was 54.5% male and 45.5% female.

=== 2000 census ===
As of the census of 2000, there were 110 people, 44 households, and 31 families living in the city. The population density was 367.0 inhabitants per square mile (141.7/km^{2}). There were 47 housing units at an average density of 156.8 per square mile (60.5/km^{2}). The racial makeup of the city was 100.00% White.

There were 44 households, out of which 38.6% had children under the age of 18 living with them, 63.6% were married couples living together, 4.5% had a female householder with no husband present, and 27.3% were non-families. 25.0% of all households were made up of individuals, and 11.4% had someone living alone who was 65 years of age or older. The average household size was 2.50 and the average family size was 3.03.

In the city, the population was spread out, with 30.9% under the age of 18, 4.5% from 18 to 24, 29.1% from 25 to 44, 15.5% from 45 to 64, and 20.0% who were 65 years of age or older. The median age was 38 years. For every 100 females, there were 103.7 males. For every 100 females age 18 and over, there were 100.0 males.

The median income for a household in the city was $38,958, and the median income for a family was $42,500. Males had a median income of $31,250 versus $24,063 for females. The per capita income for the city was $18,519. There were no families and 3.9% of the population living below the poverty line, including no under eighteens and 13.8% of those over 64.
