= Delta, Iowa =

- City
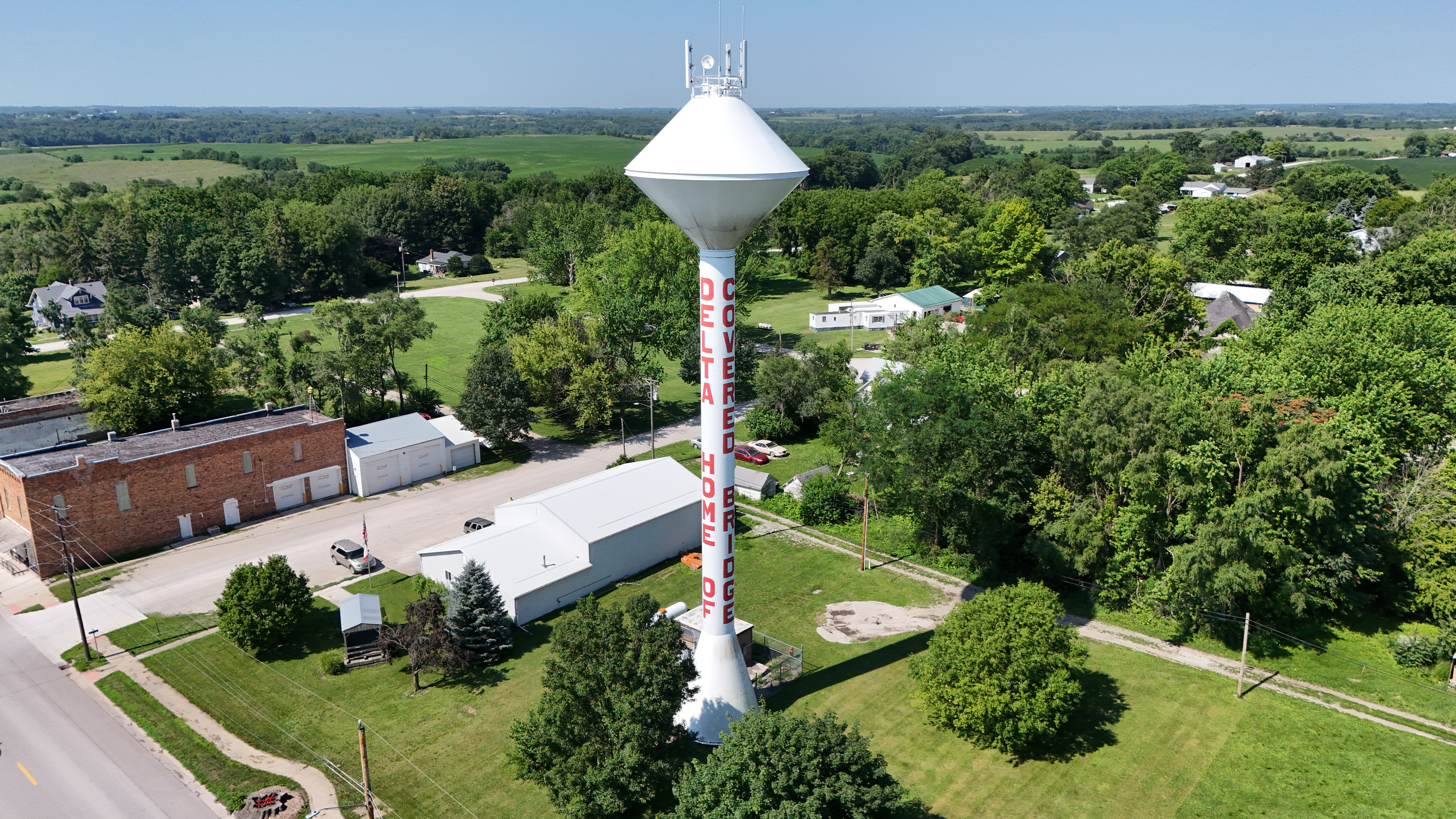
- Delta's water tower

- Location of Delta, Iowa
- Coordinates: 41°19′22″N 92°19′50″W
- Country: United States
- State: Iowa
- County: Keokuk

Area
  - Total: 0.96 sq mi (2.48 km^{2})
  - Land: 0.96 sq mi (2.48 km^{2})
  - Water: 0 sq mi (0.00 km^{2})
- Elevation: 807 ft (246 m)

Population (2020)
  - Total: 264
  - Density: 275.6/sq mi (106.41/km^{2})
- Time zone: UTC-6 (Central (CST))
  - Summer (DST): UTC-5 (CDT)
- ZIP code: 52550
- Area code: 641
- FIPS code: 19-19855
- GNIS feature ID: 2394511

Delta is a city in Keokuk County, Iowa, United States. The population was 264 at the 2020 census.

== Geography ==
According to the United States Census Bureau, the city has a total area of 0.93 square miles (2.41 km^{2}), all of it land.

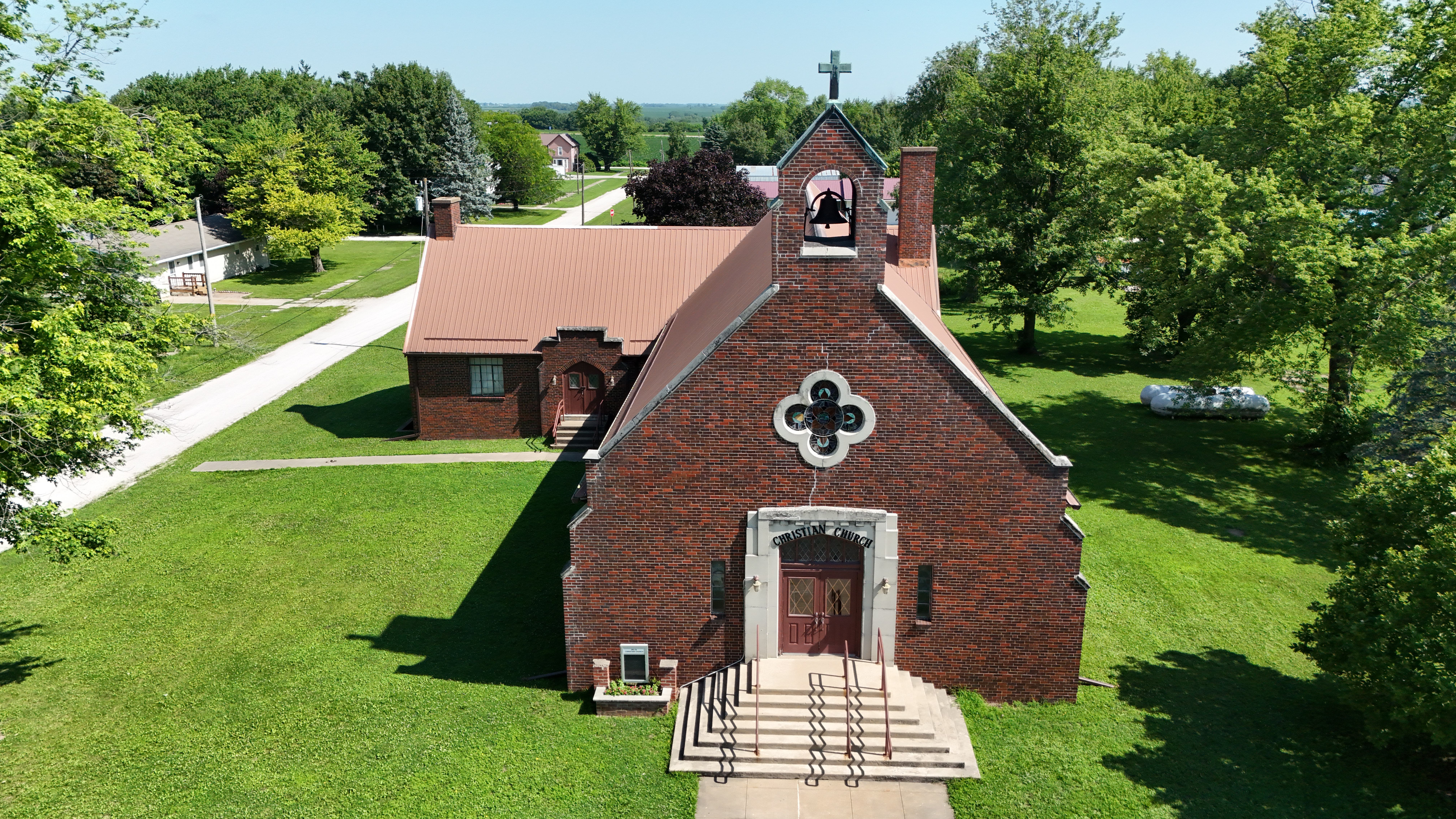
Delta Christian Church

== Demographics ==
Historical populations
Year	Pop.	±%
1880	416	—
1890	409	−1.7%
1900	691	+68.9%
1910	728	+5.4%
1920	688	−5.5%
1930	588	−14.5%
1940	602	+2.4%
1950	562	−6.6%
1960	514	−8.5%
1970	475	−7.6%
1980	482	+1.5%
1990	409	−15.1%
2000	410	+0.2%
2010	328	−20.0%
2020	264	−19.5%
Source:"U.S. Census website". United States Census Bureau. and Iowa Data Center; Source: U.S. Decennial Census

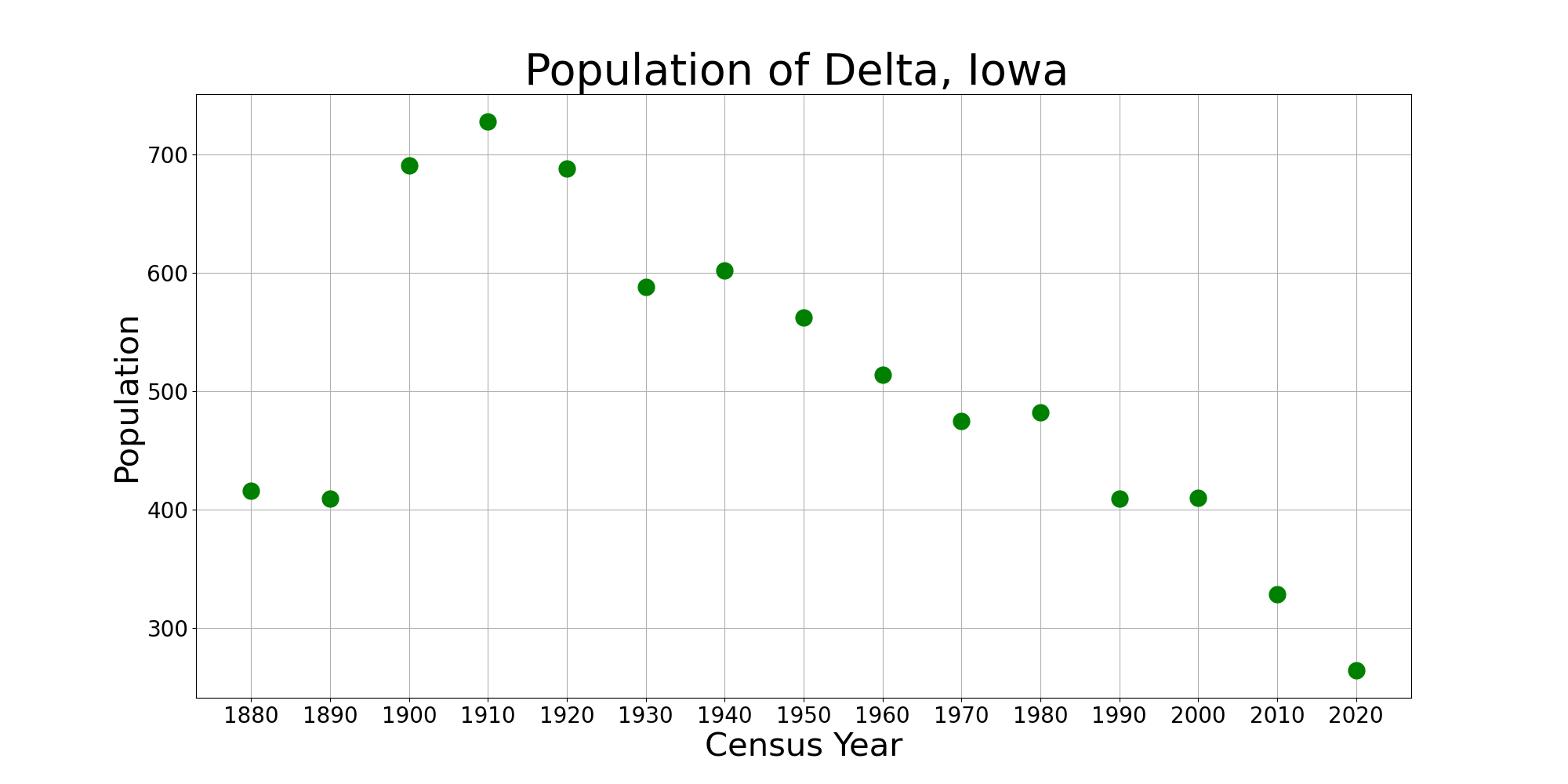
The population of Delta, Iowa from US census data

=== 2020 census ===
As of the census of 2020, there were 264 people, 114 households, and 58 families residing in the city. The population density was 275.6 inhabitants per square mile (106.4/km^{2}). There were 157 housing units at an average density of 163.9 per square mile (63.3/km^{2}). The racial makeup of the city was 96.2% White, 0.4% Black or African American, 0.0% Native American, 0.0% Asian, 0.0% Pacific Islander, 0.8% from other races and 2.7% from two or more races. Hispanic or Latino persons of any race comprised 3.4% of the population.

Of the 114 households, 18.4% of which had children under the age of 18 living with them, 36.0% were married couples living together, 7.0% were cohabitating couples, 28.1% had a female householder with no spouse or partner present and 28.9% had a male householder with no spouse or partner present. 49.1% of all households were non-families. 43.9% of all households were made up of individuals, 16.7% had someone living alone who was 65 years old or older.

The median age in the city was 46.0 years. 24.6% of the residents were under the age of 20; 2.7% were between the ages of 20 and 24; 20.8% were from 25 and 44; 31.4% were from 45 and 64; and 20.5% were 65 years of age or older. The gender makeup of the city was 50.0% male and 50.0% female.

=== 2010 census ===
As of the census of 2010, there were 328 people, 157 households, and 78 families living in the city. The population density was 352.7 inhabitants per square mile (136.2/km^{2}). There were 172 housing units at an average density of 184.9 per square mile (71.4/km^{2}). The racial makeup of the city was 97.0% White, 1.8% African American, 0.3% Native American, 0.3% from other races, and 0.6% from two or more races. Hispanic or Latino of any race were 0.6% of the population.

There were 157 households, of which 27.4% had children under the age of 18 living with them, 36.3% were married couples living together, 9.6% had a female householder with no husband present, 3.8% had a male householder with no wife present, and 50.3% were non-families. 45.2% of all households were made up of individuals, and 18.5% had someone living alone who was 65 years of age or older. The average household size was 2.09 and the average family size was 2.91.

The median age in the city was 38.9 years. 22.9% of residents were under the age of 18; 5.8% were between the ages of 18 and 24; 28% were from 25 to 44; 25.9% were from 45 to 64; and 17.4% were 65 years of age or older. The gender makeup of the city was 48.8% male and 51.2% female.

=== 2000 census ===
As of the census of 2000, there were 410 people, 172 households, and 99 families living in the city. The population density was 410.6 inhabitants per square mile (158.5/km^{2}). There were 191 housing units at an average density of 191.3 per square mile (73.9/km^{2}). The racial makeup of the city was 98.29% White, 1.22% from other races, and 0.49% from two or more races. Hispanic or Latino of any race were 1.71% of the population.

There were 172 households, out of which 26.2% had children under the age of 18 living with them, 43.6% were married couples living together, 7.6% had a female householder with no husband present, and 42.4% were non-families. 35.5% of all households were made up of individuals, and 19.8% had someone living alone who was 65 years of age or older. The average household size was 2.38 and the average family size was 3.09.

In the city, the population was spread out, with 26.8% under the age of 18, 8.5% from 18 to 24, 26.1% from 25 to 44, 19.3% from 45 to 64, and 19.3% who were 65 years of age or older. The median age was 37 years. For every 100 females, there were 83.0 males. For every 100 females age 18 and over, there were 88.7 males.

The median income for a household in the city was $27,019, and the median income for a family was $30,417. Males had a median income of $27,500 versus $18,333 for females. The per capita income for the city was $14,516. About 20.0% of families and 25.4% of the population were below the poverty line, including 33.6% of those under age 18 and 22.4% of those age 65 or over.

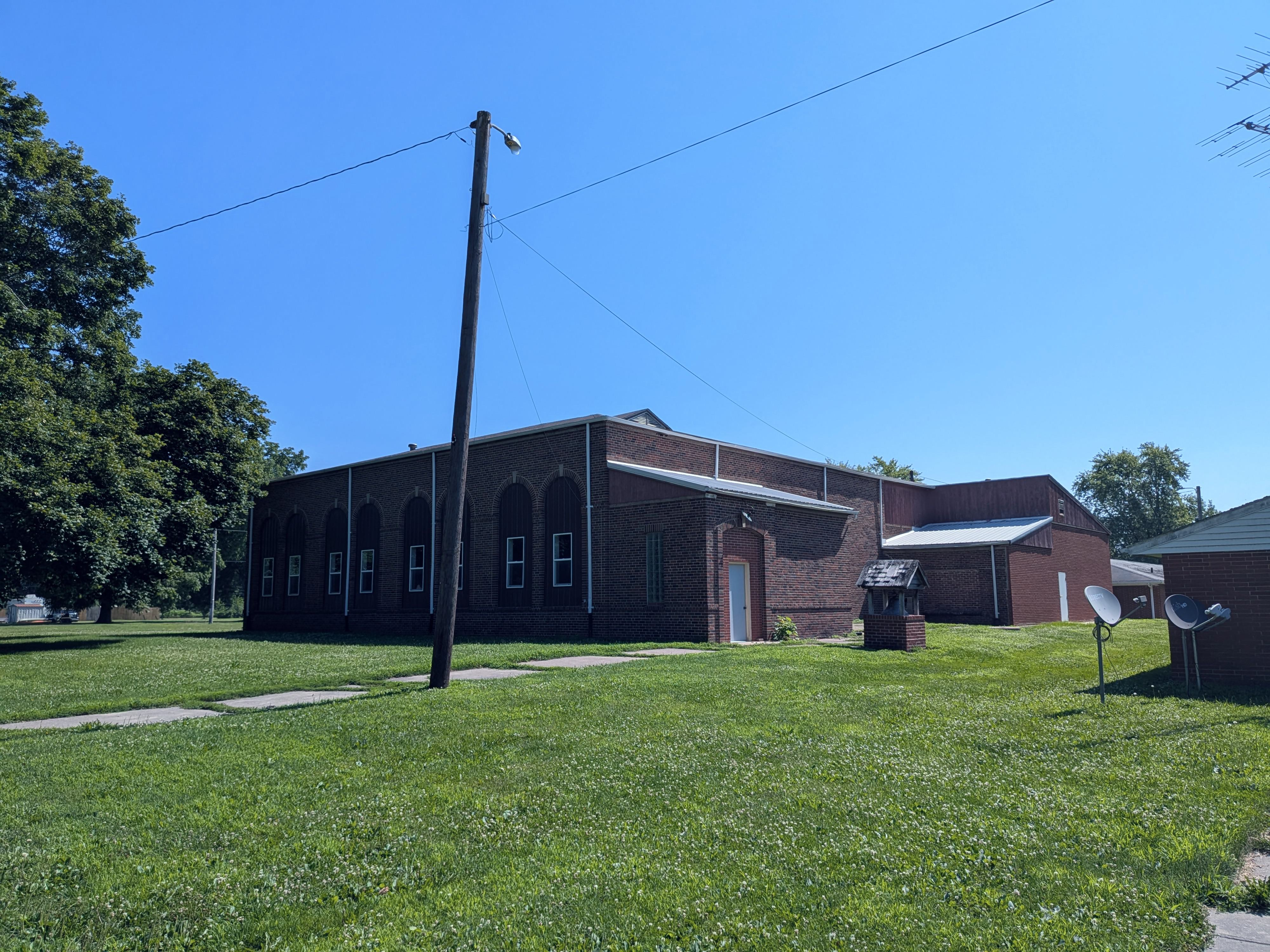
The former school building which now serves as Delta's community center

== Education ==
The community is within the Sigourney Community School District.

== Rock Island system ==
The community of Delta was, like hundreds of towns and villages, served by an expanded Rock Island system.
