= National Register of Historic Places listings in Keokuk County, Iowa =

Location of Keokuk County in Iowa

This is a list of the National Register of Historic Places listings in Keokuk County, Iowa.

This is intended to be a complete list of the properties and districts on the National Register of Historic Places in Keokuk County, Iowa. Latitude and longitude coordinates are provided for many National Register properties and districts; these locations may be seen together in a map.

There are 10 properties and districts listed on the National Register in the county.

This National Park Service list is complete through NPS recent listings posted March 14, 2025.

	Name on the Register	Image	Date listed	Location	City or town	Description
1	Bruce Goldfish Fisheries	Bruce Goldfish Fisheries	September 20, 1982 (#82002626)	East of Thornburg off Iowa Highway 22; 41°27′16″N 92°18′42″W	Thornburg	
2	Keokuk County Courthouse	Keokuk County Courthouse	July 2, 1981 (#81000251)	Main St. 41°20′00″N 92°12′16″W	Sigourney	
3	Lancaster School	Lancaster School	October 4, 1984 (#84000010)	Southeast of Sigourney; 41°16′31″N 92°10′02″W	Sigourney	
4	Masonic Opera House	Masonic Opera House	June 4, 1973 (#73000733)	201 Barnes St. 41°24′05″N 92°21′17″W	What Cheer	
5	Public Square Historic District	Public Square Historic District	April 29, 1999 (#99000487)	Roughly around the Keokuk County Courthouse; 41°20′00″N 92°12′16″W	Sigourney	
6	Ramsey Building	Ramsey Building	April 24, 2017 (#100000909)	204 E. Broadway Ave. 41°21′49″N 91°57′12″W	Keota	
7	Saints Peter and Paul Roman Catholic Church Historic District	Saints Peter and Paul Roman Catholic Church Historic District	August 6, 1986 (#86002277)	Southeast of Harper; 41°18′19″N 92°00′20″W	Harper	
8	Sigourney Public Library	Sigourney Public Library	May 23, 1983 (#83000381)	203 N. Jefferson St. 41°20′06″N 92°12′13″W	Sigourney	
9	C.F. and Mary Singmaster House	C.F. and Mary Singmaster House	January 16, 1998 (#97001608)	32263 190th St. 41°22′53″N 91°58′49″W	Keota	
10	Theodore White House		July 14, 1983 (#83000382)	Broadway St. 41°26′59″N 92°05′24″W	South English	

== Former listings ==
	Name on the Register	Image	Date listed	Date removed	Location	City or town	Description
1	Delta Covered Bridge	Delta Covered Bridge	November 8, 1974 (#74000795)	November 3, 2003	S of Delta off IA 108 across North Skunk River	Delta vicinity	Destroyed by arsonist in 2003
2	Hayesville Independent School		August 3, 1990 (#90001195)	October 15, 2014	231 Washington St. 41°15′52″N 92°14′59″W	Hayesville	
3	What Cheer City Hall		August 27, 1981 (#81000252)	March 15, 2004	Barnes and Washington Sts.	What Cheer	

== See also ==
- List of National Historic Landmarks in Iowa
- National Register of Historic Places listings in Iowa
- Listings in neighboring counties: Iowa, Jefferson, Mahaska, Poweshiek, Wapello, Washington
