= What Cheer =

What Cheer is a dated English greeting. It may also refer to:

== Places ==
- What Cheer, Iowa
  - Masonic Opera House, also known as "What Cheer Opera House"
- What Cheer House (Sacramento, California)
- "What Cheer?", the motto on the seal of Providence, Rhode Island
- What Cheer Airport, a former airport in Pawtucket, Rhode Island, later the location of Narragansett Park

== Species ==
- Whatcheeriidae, extinct family of stem-tetrapods
  - Whatcheeria, extinct genus of early tetrapod

== Literature ==
- What Cheer, a poem by Job Durfee
- What Cheer!, a story by William Clark Russell
- What Cheer, a story by RJ Edwards in the collection Meanwhile, Elsewhere

== Music ==
- Undertow Brass Band, known as "What Cheer? Brigade" until 2020
- Wot Cher! Knocked 'em in the Old Kent Road, a song by Albert Chevalier
- What Cheer, a song on the album Dream Skipper by Nana Mizuki
- What Cheer, a song on the The Jethro Tull Christmas Album
- What Cheer (or What Cher), a Christmas carol in Richard Hill's Commonplace Book
- What Cheer, a Christmas choral by William Walton; see List of compositions by William Walton
- What Cheer, a choral by Peter Warlock; see List of compositions by Peter Warlock

== Other ==
- What Cheer, a British ship wrecked in Malaya; see List of shipwrecks in January 1870
