= Abram Troup =

State legislator in Kansas

Abram Troup Jr. (September 14, 1865 – 1947) was a merchant, state legislator, and public official in Kansas. A Republican, he served in the Kansas House of Representatives from 1919 to 1921. He represented Phillips County. In 1918 he defeated Democrat Frank Donovan. He defeated Democrat A. B. Dixon of Agra, Kansas in 1920.

His father, Abram Troup Sr. (January 13, 1819 – June 17, 1892), moved from Pennsylvania to Kansas in 1874. Abram Troup Jr. born in South English, Iowa. He married Flora Cochran in 1893. He had brothers and sisters including judge M. G. Troup.

From 1922 to 1925 he served as treasurer of the Kansas Board of Embalming. He served two terms in the state legislature representing Phillips County. A House Resolution noted his passing. In 1931 he was documented as a postmaster in Logan, Kansas. He was married to Flora Troup.

He died in 1947.
