= Frank N. Seerley =

American football coach

Biographical details
- Born: November 21, 1859; South English, Iowa, U.S.
- Died: 1946; Sarasota County, Florida, U.S.
- Education: Springfield YMCA (1890); Iowa State Normal School (1896)

Coaching career (HC unless noted)
- 1892–1894: Springfield YMCA

Head coaching record
- Overall: 7–3–2

Frank N. Seerley (November 21, 1859 – 1946) was an American football coach. He served as the head football coach at his alma mater, the Springfield YMCA Training School—now known as Springfield College—in Springfield, Massachusetts from 1892 to 1894, compiling a record of 7–3–2. He was the brother of Homer Horatio Seerley, president of the Iowa State Normal School / Iowa State Teachers College Teachers College—now known as University of Northern Iowa—from 1886 to 1928.
