= Theodore White House =

Historic house in Iowa, United States

- U.S. National Register of Historic Places
- Location within Iowa Location within the United States
- Location: Broadway St. South English, Iowa
- Coordinates: 41°26′59″N 92°05′24″W
- Area: less than one acre
- Built: 1899-1900
- Architectural style: Queen Anne
- NRHP reference No.: 83000382
- Added to NRHP: July 14, 1983

The Theodore White House, also known as the White Sisters House, is located in South English, Iowa, United States. Theodore White was a local merchant who operated a general store. The family operated White State Bank from 1908 to 1919. He had this house built in 1900, and it remained in the family until the early 1970s. The house is a transitional Queen Anne, which is unique in South English for both its scale and style. The two-story, frame house features a corner tower with a conical roof, a wrap-around porch built on brick piers, and pedimented dormers on the hip roof. It was listed on the National Register of Historic Places in 1983.
