= Lancaster School (Sigourney, Iowa) =

- U.S. National Register of Historic Places
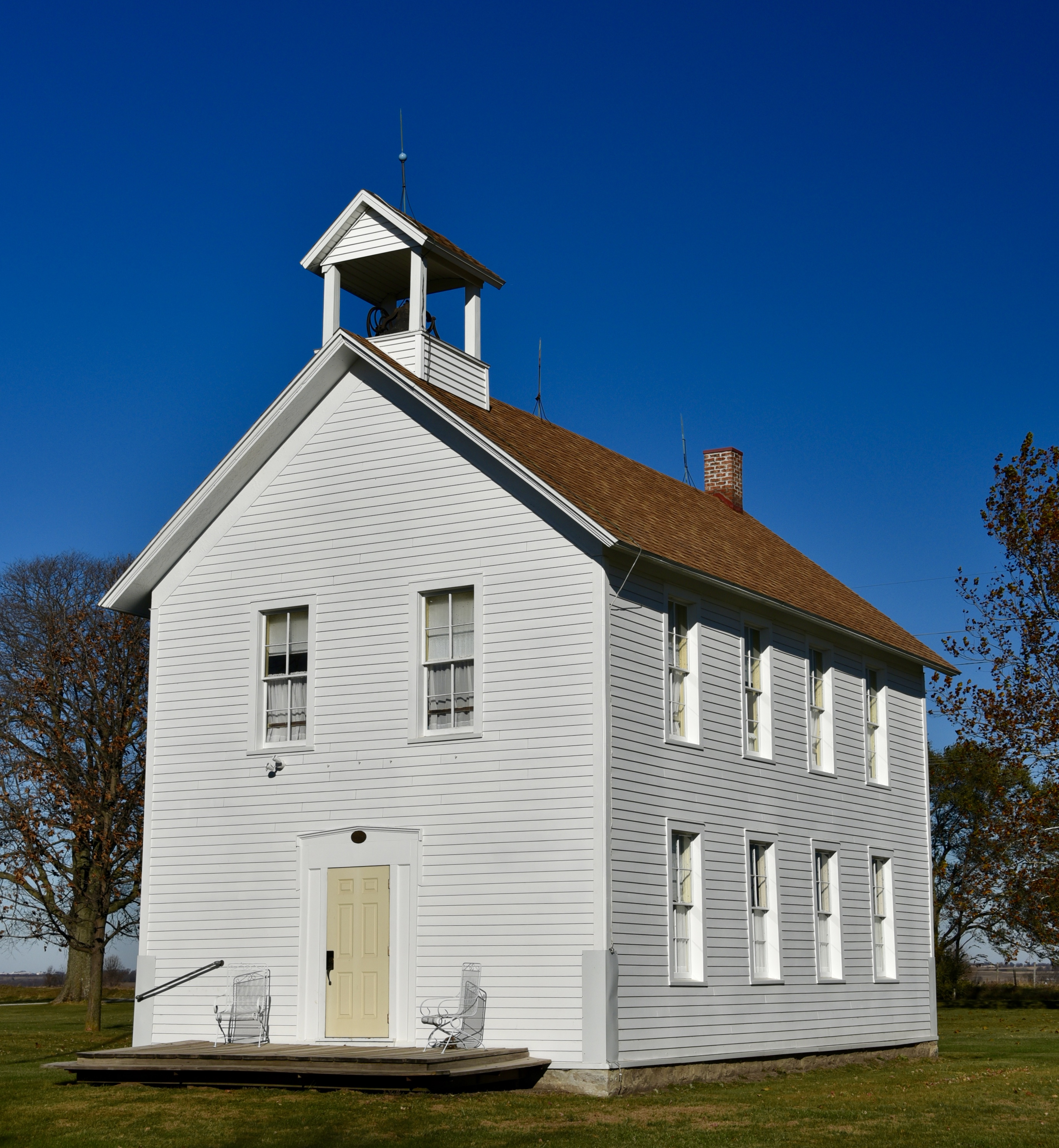

- Location within Iowa Location within the United States
- Location: Southeast of Sigourney
- Coordinates: 41.275175°N 92.167284°W
- Area: 1 acre (0.40 ha)
- Built: 1881
- Built by: Reynolds Bros.
- Architectural style: Colonial Revival
- NRHP reference No.: 84000010
- Added to NRHP: October 4, 1984

Lancaster School is a preserved 1881 two-story schoolhouse located in rural Keokuk County, Iowa, United States southeast of the county seat of Sigourney.

== History ==
Lancaster School is the last remaining public building in what was the former county seat of Lancaster. It occupies the ground that was the courthouse square. The school was one of six two-story buildings built by the county for educational purposes in the 1870s and early 1880s. They required two teachers, and were therefore more expensive to operate. This building was constructed in 1881 by Reynolds Bros. It replaced a school building that had been built further east in 1874. It is a two-story frame structure that measures 33 by 22 feet (10.1 by 6.7 m). The pedimented entry faces the south, and there is a belfry above the gable. A single classroom is located on the northern two-thirds of both floors. The town of Lancaster at one time had 32 buildings, but it started to decline in the 20th century. Enrollment in the school was 119 in 1898, but fell to about thirty early in the 20th century. When it closed in 1964 there were 13 students enrolled, and by that time they only utilized the first floor. The former school building, one of the churches and a few houses are all that remain of Lancaster. The building has been used in subsequent years as a voting facility. It was listed on the National Register of Historic Places in 1984.
