= Tally's War =

Talley's War also called the Skunk River War was an incident in 1863 in Iowa, in which pro-war individuals opened fire on a peace demonstration; one person was killed.

== Conflict ==
Cyphert (or Syphert) Tally was a pro-peace Baptist minister whose family moved into the Keokuk County, Iowa, area from Tennessee in 1840. During the Civil War, he became known in Keokuk County for pro-peace speeches, which sometimes drew an armed audience. On Saturday, August 1, 1863, he spoke at a Democratic rally near the English river to an audience of hundreds. After the rally, Tally and others rode in wagons to the nearby town of South English, Iowa, where a meeting of Republicans had taken place. He was warned not to enter the town, but did so anyway, to accusations of his cowardice. According to an 1880 recounting of the event, the Democrats in wagons displayed their weapons at these cries to the equally well-armed people in the town. It was said that a townsperson started the firing. Hundreds of shots were fired, but only Tally died.

== Resolution ==
Tally's friends sent out the word of his death widely, and the next day people began to arrive in answer to the news, demanding vengeance. A citizen committee reassured the first hundred who assembled that the guilty party would be sought and brought to justice, but the crowd continued to gather, until hundreds of men had formed by the Skunk River into what would later be known as the Skunk River Army. Several citizens of the town made an excursion to Davenport, Iowa, to appeal to Governor Kirkwood, who travelled with several hundred troops and cannons to the area. While the action brought legends of the terrified retreat of the Skunk River Army, the fact is that it had all but disbanded before the governor arrived.

All told, eleven companies were engaged in quelling uprisings in August 1863 in Keokuk County. No one was indicted for the crime of shooting Tally, although the placement of the wound suggested it was intentionally inflicted. Citizens of the area kept the identity of the shooter to themselves.

== Sources ==
- The History of Washington County, Iowa Union County Historical Society. 1880. pp. 523–527.
- Iowa: The Middle Land Dorothy Schwieder. 1996. University of Iowa Press. pp. 77–78.
