= Bruce Goldfish Fisheries =

- U.S. National Register of Historic Places
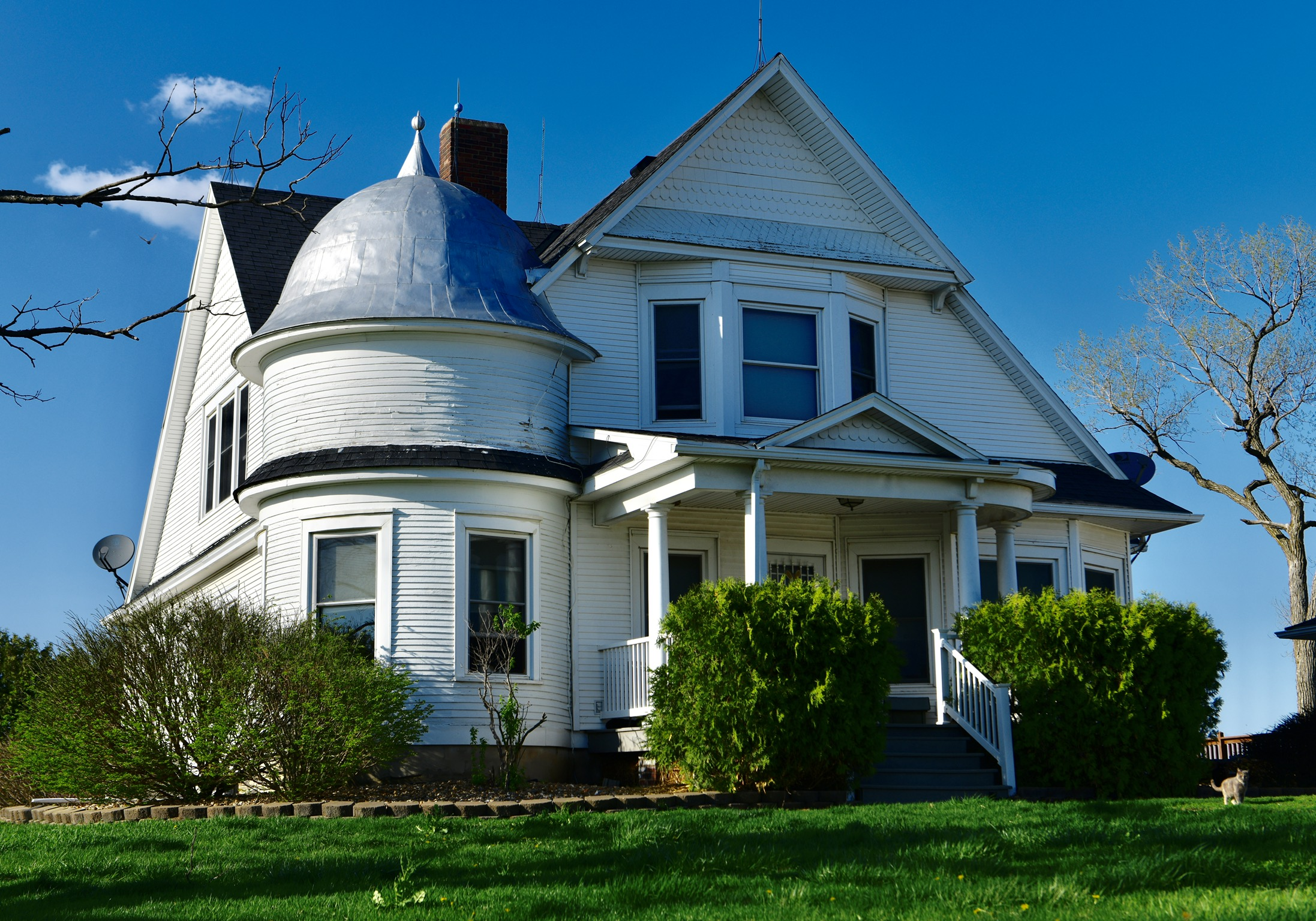

- Location within Iowa Location within the United States
- Location: East of Thornburg off Iowa Highway 22
- Coordinates: 41°27′18″N 92°18′58″W
- Area: 80 acres (32 ha)
- Built: 1877 (fisheries); 1910 (house)
- Built by: E.K. Bruce, Jr.
- Architectural style: Queen Anne; Neoclassical
- NRHP reference No.: 82002626
- Added to NRHP: September 20, 1982

Bruce Goldfish Fisheries is located in rural Keokuk County, Iowa, United States east of the village of Thornburg. The fishery was founded in 1877 and ended operations in the 1940s. It became listed on the National Register of Historic Places in 1982.

== History ==
It was established in 1877 by Elgin K. Bruce, who had started raising goldfish in Pittsburgh in 1845. His son, E.K. Bruce, Jr., took over the business in 1900 and he had the 1½-story, frame, Queen Anne-Neoclassical style house completed in 1910.

At one time, the Bruce Goldfish Fisheries consisted of twenty-four ponds, nine windmills, two fish houses, a storage house, barn, garage and two cement tanks sunk in the ground. The tanks were used to display the fish for public tours, and to sort them before they were shipped. The heyday of the business was in the 1920s, shipping goldfish across the United States and around the world.

Tariff protections were removed in 1933 and the American market was opened to less expensive Japanese fish. The effects of the Great Depression also led to the rapid decline of the business. E.K. Bruce, Jr. died in 1936 and the family tried to continue the operation, but it came to an end in the early 1940s. The Bruce family remained on the property until 1978. The house and some of the ponds remain on the property. The farm was listed on the National Register of Historic Places in 1982.
