= Ramsey Building =

- U.S. National Register of Historic Places
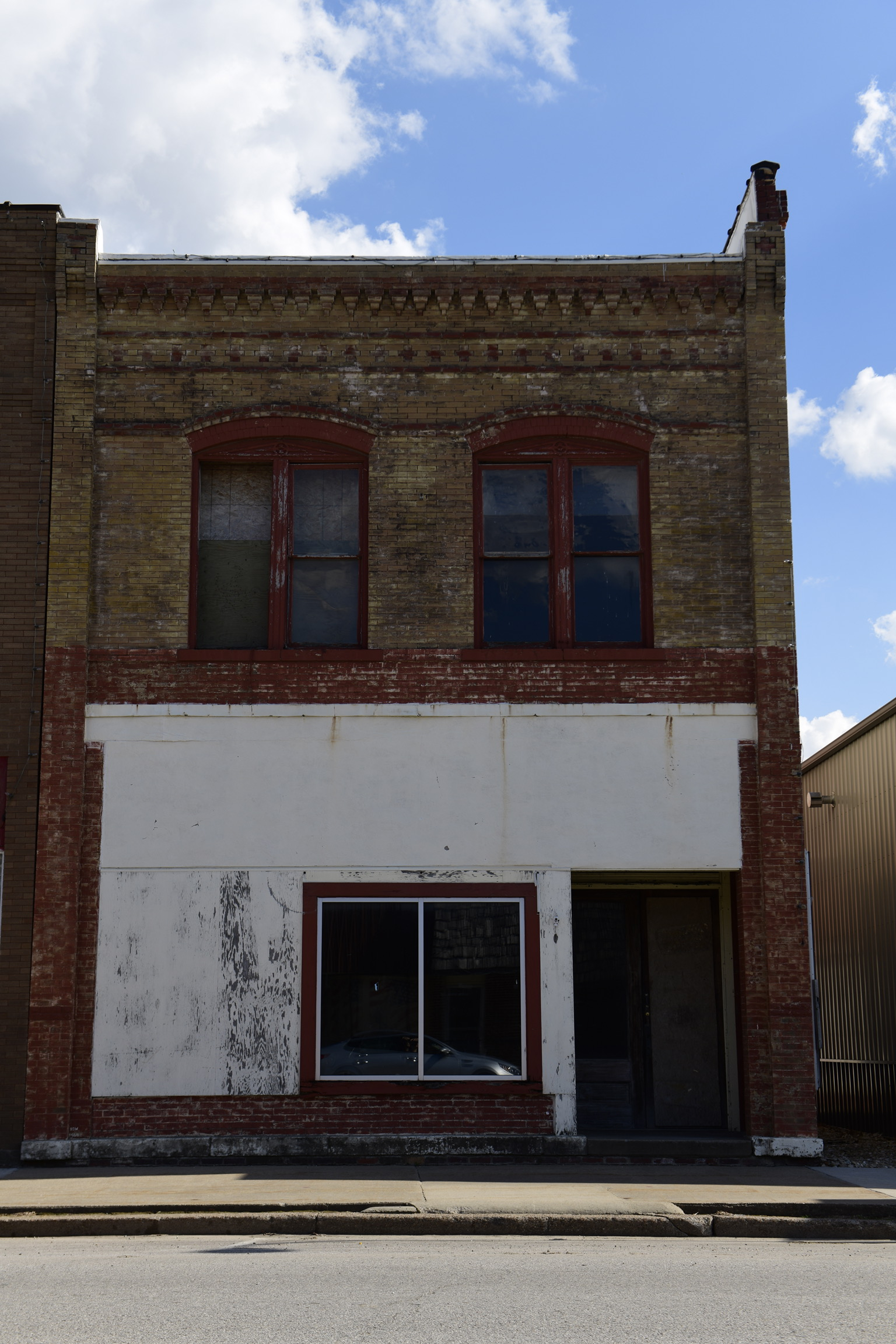

- Location within Iowa Location within the United States
- Location: 204 E. Broadway Ave. Keota, Iowa
- Coordinates: 41°21′48.9″N 91°57′11.9″W
- Area: less than one acre
- Built: 1893
- Architectural style: Romanesque Revival
- NRHP reference No.: 100000909
- Added to NRHP: April 24, 2017

The Ramsey Building is a historic building located in Keota, Iowa, United States. Eben J. Ramsey had the two-story, brick, Romanesque Revival commercial building constructed in 1895. Its significance is derived from its association with both the furniture and funeral business. Ramsey had both businesses in the building until 1907. He had to partially rebuild it after a fire in 1897. A furniture store continued to occupy the building until 1957. A funeral home was located here until 1937 when it was relocated to a house. This marked the separation of a business marketing goods with one that provided services. At the same time, the furniture store merged with the new appliance store, which represented a sift to selling traditional furnishings with modern conveniences for the home. The building was listed on the National Register of Historic Places in 2017.
