= Public Square Historic District (Sigourney, Iowa) =

Historic district in Iowa, United States

- U.S. National Register of Historic Places
- U.S. Historic district
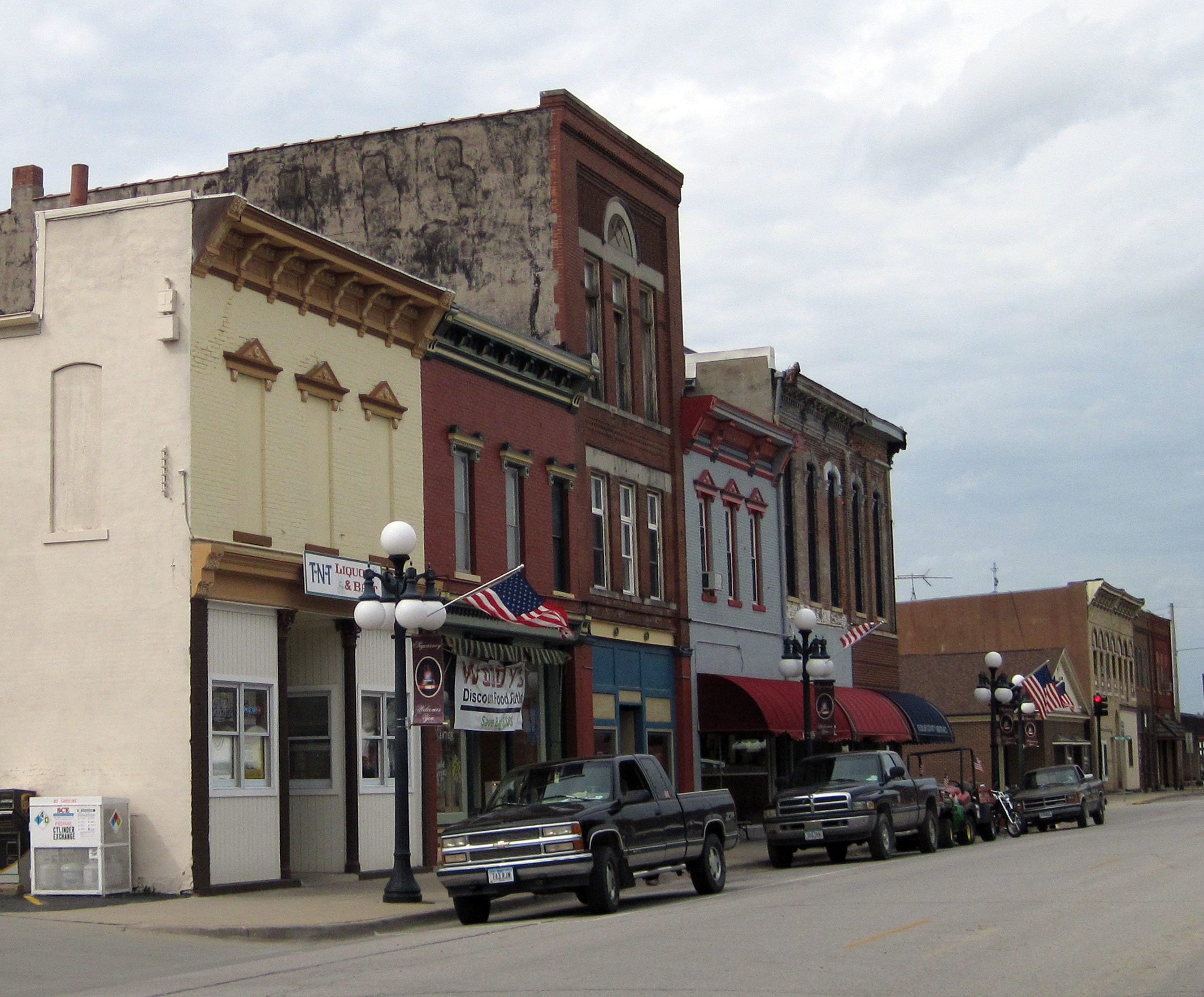

- Location within Iowa Location within the United States
- Interactive map showing the location for Public Square Historic District
- Location: Roughly around Keokuk County Court House, Sigourney, Iowa
- Coordinates: 41°20′0″N 92°12′16″W
- Area: 11.9 acres (4.8 ha)
- Architect: Wetherell and Gage; Burdette Higgins
- Architectural style: Italianate; Romanesque, et al.
- MPS: Sigourney, Iowa MPS
- NRHP reference No.: 99000487
- Added to NRHP: April 29, 1999

The Public Square Historic District in Sigourney, Iowa, United States is a 11.9-acre (4.8 ha) historic district that was listed on the National Register of Historic Places in 1999. The listing included 41 contributing buildings, a contributing structure, and two contributing objects. The district includes work by architects Wetherell & Gage.

The district largely includes commercial buildings that surround the 1911 Keokuk County Courthouse, which is separately listed on the National Register. For the most part the buildings are one or two-story brick structures. Two of the buildings are three stories. Initially, the buildings built around the square were all wood-frame construction. After the Civil War brick buildings began to replace them, with 1876 being a prominent year for new construction. The change from wood to brick structures continued into the 20th century. There are also two other civic buildings in the district, Memorial Hall (1923; Sigourney City Hall and auditorium), and the post office (1938). Both of these buildings are located just off of the square proper. The contributing structure is a bandstand, and contributing objects are a fountain, and a Civil War Monument. All three are located on the courthouse grounds.
