= Keokuk County Courthouse =

- U.S. National Register of Historic Places
- U.S. Historic district – Contributing property
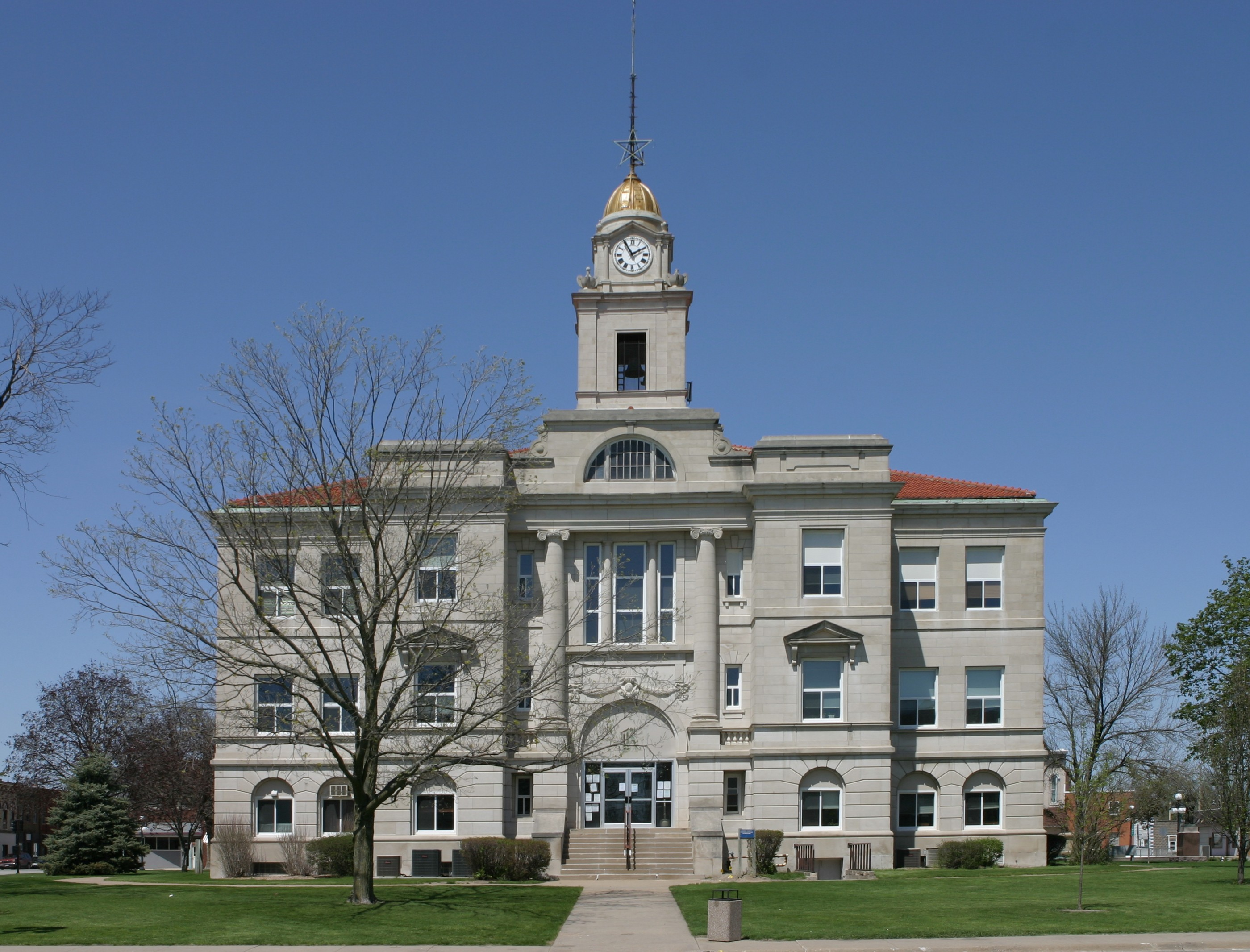

- Location within Iowa Location within the United States
- Interactive map showing the location for Keokuk County Courthouse
- Location: Main St. Sigourney, Iowa
- Coordinates: 41°20′0″N 92°12′16″W
- Built: 1909–1911
- Built by: J.L Simmons
- Architect: Wetherell & Gage
- Architectural style: Classical Revival
- Part of: Public Square Historic District (ID99000487)
- MPS: County Courthouses in Iowa TR
- NRHP reference No.: 81000251
- Added to NRHP: July 2, 1981

The Keokuk County Courthouse located in Sigourney, Iowa, United States, was built in 1911. It was individually listed on the National Register of Historic Places in 1981 as a part of the County Courthouses in Iowa Thematic Resource. In 1999 it was included as a contributing property in the Public Square Historic District. The courthouse is the fourth building the county has used for court functions and county administration.

== History ==
Keokuk County built its first courthouse in Sigourney in 1845 for $218. The 24-by-20-foot (7.3 by 6.1 m) building, which was constructed of logs, also housed the jail and served as a schoolhouse, public hall, and hotel. Lancaster became the county seat in the late 1840s and a two-story frame courthouse was built there in 1848 for $699. By the mid-1850s the county seat was back in Sigourney. A new courthouse was built in 1858 for $17,200. It was remodeled over the years until the present courthouse was begun in 1909. It was completed two years later at a cost of $150,000.

== Architecture ==
The building was designed in the Classical Revival style by the Des Moines architectural firm Wetherell & Gage, and built by J.L Simmons. The Columbian Exposition of 1893 in Chicago influenced the design of the building. The Bedford limestone structure rests on a raised basement level. Each facade features a frontispiece with large engaged columns in the Ionic order that are set in antis above first floor level. It is capped by a clock tower and cupola. Other historic structures on the courthouse square include a fountain, bandstand, and a Civil War Monument. The significance of the courthouse is derived from its association with county government, and the political power and prestige of Sigourney as the county seat.
