= List of shipwrecks in January 1870 =

The list of shipwrecks in January 1870 includes ships sunk, foundered, grounded, or otherwise lost during January 1870.

== 1 January ==
List of shipwrecks: 1 January 1870
Ship	State	Description
Anne	United Kingdom	The barque was driven ashore and wrecked at Villarreal, Spain. Her twelve crew were rescued. She was on a voyage from Gibraltar to Villarreal.
David	United Kingdom	The ship was driven ashore at The Gobbins, County Antrim. She was on a voyage from Dublin to Troon, Ayrshire.
Hermann Weedel	Flag unknown	The barque was discovered abandoned in the Atlantic Ocean 120 nautical miles (220 km) south west of The Lizard, Cornwall (48°18′N 6°10′W) by the steamship Thomas Powell (United Kingdom), which put four crew aboard with the intention of taking her in to Falmouth, Cornwall. She was taken in to Dartmouth, Devon on 3 February in a waterlogged condition with assistance from Vesta (United Kingdom).
Volunteer	United Kingdom	The ship was driven ashore at Villarreal. Her crew were rescued. She was on a voyage from Gaspé, Quebec, Canada to Cádiz, Spain.

== 2 January ==
List of shipwrecks: 2 January 1870
Ship	State	Description
Eliza	United Kingdom	The ship foundered in the Bristol Channel with the loss of all hands.
Pluto, Quickstep, an unnamed flat, and a tender	Brazil	The schooner Pluto was obliterated by an explosion of gunpowder at Cerrito with the loss of all nineteen people on board. The explosion caused two further explosions destroying the pontoon Quickstep and a gunpowder magazine, in total 360 long tons (370 t) of gunpowder. A tender and a flat were also sunk.
Theban	United Kingdom	The steamship departed from Gibraltar for Glasgow, Renfrewshire. No further trace, presumed foundered with the loss of all hands.
Unnamed	United Kingdom	The ship caught fire and sank off Ostend, West Flanders, Belgium.

== 3 January ==
List of shipwrecks: 3 January 1870
Ship	State	Description
Courter	United Kingdom	The ship ran aground. She was on a voyage from Liverpool, Lancashire to Aberdeen. She was refloated and taken in to Stornoway, Isle of Lewis, Outer Hebrides.
Delegate	United Kingdom	The ship was wrecked on the Barber Sand, in the North Sea off the coast of Norfolk. She was on a voyage from Harwich, Essex to Blyth, Northumberland.
Emilie	United Kingdom	The steamship ran aground off "Zugenoit", near Kristiansund, Norway. She was on a voyage from Sunderland, County Durham to Stettin.
Herald	United Kingdom	The steamship ran aground at Pillau, Prussia. She was refloated.
Isabella	United Kingdom	The ship was wrecked at Scarborough, Yorkshire.
Louise	France	The ship caught fire off Gravelines, Nord and was abandoned by her crew.
Sainte Fleur	France	The ship was lost. She was on a voyage from Nantes, Loire-Inférieure to Cardiff, Glamorgan, United Kingdom.

== 4 January ==
List of shipwrecks: 4 January 1870
Ship	State	Description
Brenton	United Kingdom	The schooner was driven ashore on Horse Isle, in the Firth of Clyde. She was on a voyage from Belfast, County Antrim to Ardrossan, Ayrshire. Brenton was refloated on 8 January and taken in to Ardrossan in a leaky condition.
Clyde	United Kingdom	The steamship foundered off Hirtshals, Denmark. Her crew were rescued by a British barque. She was on a voyage from Ängelholm, Sweden to Hartlepool, County Durham.
Eliza	United Kingdom	The ship foundered in the Bristol Channel with the loss of all hands.
Ellen	United Kingdom	The ship was driven ashore and wrecked at Barmouth, Merionethshire. She was on a voyage from Bristol, Gloucestershire to Barmouth.
Hansa	United Kingdom	The ship ran aground on Taylor's Bank, in Liverpool Bay. She was on a voyage from Paraíba, Brazil to Liverpool, Lancashire. She was refloated and taken in to Liverpool in a leaky condition.
Jessie Campbell	United States	The barque was abandoned in the Atlantic Ocean. Her ten crew took to two boats. Four crew in one of the boats landed at Graciosa, Canary Islands. Those in the other boat were reported missing. She was on a voyage from New York to Bristol, Gloucestershire, United Kingdom.
Maria	United States Navy	The tug was run into and sunk off the coast of New England by the monitor USS Miantonomoh (United States Navy) with the loss of four of her crew.
Standard	United Kingdom	The smack was run down and sunk at Brightlingsea, Essex by the steamship Mizpah (United Kingdom).
Tamaulipas	United Kingdom	The steamship collided with the Mersey ferry Gem (United Kingdom). Tamaulipas was on a voyage from Bordeaux, Gironde, France to Liverpool. She was taken in to Liverpool, where she sank the next day.
Trenton	United Kingdom	The ship was driven ashore on Horse Island, County Cork.
Volunteer	United Kingdom	The schooner capsized in the Menai Strait. Her crew were rescued. She was on a voyage from Hamburg to Barrow-in-Furness, Lancashire.
'Unnamed	Austro-Hungarian Navy	The frigate was driven ashore at Honolulu, Kingdom of Hawaii.

== 5 January ==
List of shipwrecks: 5 January 1870
Ship	State	Description
Ada	United Kingdom	The schooner was wrecked on the East Saddles, in the South China Sea with the loss of three of her crew.
Eliza	United Kingdom	The cutter foundered off Newhaven, Sussex.
Elizabeth Margaret	United Kingdom	The ship foundered off Woodhaven, Fife. She was on a voyage from Dundee, Forfarshire to Woodhaven.
Enchantress	United Kingdom	The schooner collided with the steamship Talbot (United Kingdom) and sank off the Mull of Galloway, Wigtownshire. Her five crew were rescued by Talbot.
Flekkefjord	Norway	The barque ran aground, heeled over and was severely damaged at Belfast, County Antrim, United Kingdom. She was refloated.
Inchdairnie	United Kingdom	The barque was wrecked in the Caicos Passage. Her crew were rescued. She was on a voyage from New York, United States to Montego Bay, Jamaica.
La Halma, or Lahaina	United States of Colombia	The brig foundered in Ballycotton Bay with the loss of all hands. She was on a voyage from Riohacha to Liverpool, Lancashire, United Kingdom.

== 6 January ==
List of shipwrecks: 6 January 1870
Ship	State	Description
Attila	United Kingdom	The ship was abandoned in the Atlantic Ocean. Her crew were rescued. She was on a voyage from Liverpool, Lancashire to Baltimore, Maryland, United States.
E. H. Taylor	United Kingdom	The ship was driven ashore and wrecked at Port Erin, Isle of Man. She was on a voyage from Liverpool, Lancashire to New York, United States.
Etoile du Nord	France	The schooner was wrecked at Penmarc'h, Finistère with the loss of two of her crew.
Johanna	Denmark	The ship was driven ashore on Skagen. She was on a voyage from Burntisland, Fife, Northumberland, United Kingdom to Copenhagen.
Londonderry	United Kingdom	The ship ran aground at Hartlepool, County Durham. She was on a voyage from Hartlepool to Rochester, Kent. She was refloated and put back to Hartlepool.
Olga	Sweden	The ship was driven ashore near Gothenburg. She was on a voyage from Newcastle upon Tyne, United Kingdom to Gothenburg.
Reindeer	United Kingdom	The ship ran aground and sank off Orfordness, Suffolk. Her crew were rescued. She was on a voyage from Great Yarmouth, Norfolk to London.
Robin Hood	United States	The full-rigged ship was destroyed by fire at Bakers Island, Massachusetts. She was on a voyage from San Francisco, California to Queenstown, County Cork, United Kingdom.
Runnymede	United Kingdom	The ship was wrecked 10 nautical miles (19 km) south of Niigata, Japan. She was on a voyage from Hakodate, Japan to London.
Wasp	United Kingdom	The Mersey Flat collided with the steamship Nova Scotian (United Kingdom) and sank in the River Mersey. Her crew survived.

== 7 January ==
List of shipwrecks: 7 January 1870
Ship	State	Description
Ada	United Kingdom	The schooner was driven ashore at Hook of Holland, South Holland, Netherlands.
Amy	United Kingdom	The schooner was driven ashore at Plymouth, Devon. Her crew were rescued by rocket apparatus.
Amelia	Norway	The ship was driven ashore at Plymouth.
Cheval Marin	France	The ship foundered off "Cabella".
Countess	United Kingdom	The brig was driven ashore at Sizewell, Suffolk. Her crew were rescued. She was on a voyage from London to Belfast, County Antrim.
Diadem	United Kingdom	The steamship ran aground on the East Knock, in the Thames Estuary.
Friendship	United Kingdom	The sloop was driven ashore 5 nautical miles (9.3 km) east of Dunbar, Lothian. She was on a voyage from Sunderland, County Durham to Fisherrow, Lothian. She was refloated and taken in to Eyemouth, Berwickshire in a sinking condition.
Gambia	United Kingdom	The steamship sprang a leak and foundered in the North Sea 40 nautical miles (74 km) north of the Dudgeon Sandbank. All 53 people on board were rescued by the barque Solon ( (Russian Empire) Grand Duchy of Finland). Gambia was on a voyage from London to Aberdeen.
Jane Gwynne	United Kingdom	The ship was driven ashore at Abersoch, Caernarfonshire. She was on a voyage from Yarmouth, Isle of Wight to Liverpool, Lancashire. She was refloated and taken in to Pwllheli, Caernarfonshire.
King Lear	United Kingdom	The barque foundered 30 nautical miles (56 km) off the Smalls Lighthouse, Cornwall with the loss of 35 of the 39 people on board. Survivors were rescued by the steamship Chester (United Kingdom). King Lear was on a voyage from Cardiff, Glamorgan to Hong Kong.
Maria Regina	Flag unknown	The ship capsized at Amsterdam, North Holland, Netherlands.
Olivia	United Kingdom	The barque was driven ashore north of the mouth of the River Avon. She was on a voyage from Bristol, Gloucestershire to the Cape Verde Islands.
Petite Leocadie	France	The ship ran aground off Ragshead, Isles of Scilly, United Kingdom. She was on a voyage from Cardiff to Quiberon, Morbihan. She was refloated and beached at New Grimsby, Isles of Scilly.
Salcombe	United Kingdom	The full-rigged ship was driven ashore at Plymouth.
Svesta''	Russia	The brigantine was driven ashore at Plymouth. Her crew were rescued by rocket apparatus, but her captain committed suicide.
Star of the West	United Kingdom	The ship broke from her moorings, collided with the steamship Prince of Wales (United Kingdom) and was driven ashore at Bristol.
St. Bede	United Kingdom	The steamship collided with the steamship Black Swan (United Kingdom) and foundered in the North Sea 9 nautical miles (17 km) off Flamborough Head, Yorkshire with the loss of eighteen of her nineteen crew. St. Bede was on a voyage from Newcastle upon Tyne, Northumberland to Huelva, Spain.
Terpsichore	United Kingdom	The barque was driven ashore and wrecked 6 leagues (18 nautical miles (33 km)) north of Mar Chiquita, Argentina. She was on a voyage from Buenos Aires, Argentina to Valparaíso, Chile.
Victor	United Kingdom	The schooner sank at Newport, Monmouthshire. She was on a voyage from Newport to the Clyde. She was refloated the next day.

== 8 January ==
List of shipwrecks: 8 January 1870
Ship	State	Description
Alice	Hamburg	The ship was driven ashore at Waterloo, Lancashire, United Kingdom. She was on a voyage from Liverpool, Lancashire to Tobasco. She was refloated on 16 January and taken in to Liverpool.
Andrina	Austria-Hungary	The brig was abandoned off the Smalls Lighthouse, Cornwall, United Kingdom. Her crew were rescued by the brig Patagonia (United Kingdom). She was on a voyage from Sulina, Ottoman Empire to a British port. she was subsequently towed in to Milford Haven, Pembrokeshire, United Kingdom by the steamship Athlete (United Kingdom).
Charles et Amélie	France	The schooner was driven ashore at Swansea, Glamorgan, United Kingdom. Her crew were rescued, but her pilot was drowned. She was on a voyage from Bordeaux, Gironde to Porthcawl, Glamorgan.
Henukkertensen	Norway	The barque was taken in to South Shields, County Durham, United Kingdom in a derelict condition by two Dutch fishing smacks.
Henry and Harriet	United Kingdom	The ship foundered in the North Sea 15 nautical miles (28 km) north east of Cromer, Norfolk with the loss of two of her seven crew. Survivors were rescued by the smack Electra (United Kingdom). Henry and Harriet was on a voyage from South Shields to London.
Lass o'Gowrie	United Kingdom	The tug sank at Milford Haven, Pembrokeshire.
Little Liz	United Kingdom	The ship was driven ashore east of the Little Orme Head, Caernarfonshire. Her crew were rescued. She was on a voyage from Africa to Liverpool.
Rosina	Italy	The ship was driven ashore at Milford Haven.
Suez	Austria-Hungary	The barque was wrecked on the Doom Bar. Her nine crew were rescued by the Padstow Lifeboat Albert Edward ( Royal National Lifeboat Institution).
Ulrika	Sweden	The ship was abandoned in the Atlantic Ocean (49°11′N 7°10′W). Her crew were rescued. She was on a voyage from the River Tyne to Havana, Cuba. She was towed in to Plymouth, Devon, United Kingdom on 16 January in a derelict condition.
William	United Kingdom	The schooner was driven ashore at the Landguard Fort, Felixtowe, Suffolk. She was refloated the next day.

== 9 January ==
List of shipwrecks: 9 January 1870
Ship	State	Description
Alida	Netherlands	The ship foundered. She was on a voyage from Blyth, Northumberland, United Kingdom to Groningen.
Cambridgeshire	United Kingdom	The steamship ran aground on the Jenkin Sand, in the Thames Estuary. She was later refloated and sailed for London.
Cossipore	United Kingdom	The ship foundered in the Atlantic Ocean (50°41′N 7°49′W) with the loss of sixteen of her 28 crew. Survivors were rescued by the steamships Bonny and Navarre (both United Kingdom). Cossipore was on a voyage from Liverpool, Lancashire to Calcutta, India.
Jordan	United Kingdom	The derelict brig foundered in the Irish Sea off Arklow, County Wicklow, witnessed by the steamship Lara (United Kingdom). She had been on a voyage from Falmouth, Cornwall to Cork.
Leonora	United Kingdom	The ship ran aground on the Spile Sand, off the north Kent coast. She floated off but conseuqnetly sank. Her crew were rescued by Providence (United Kingdom).
Lynx	United Kingdom	The steamship ran aground near Margate, Kent. She was refloated and taken in to Margate.
Milberg Engstrom	Norway	The barque collided with another vessel and sank in the English Channel 3 nautical miles (5.6 km) off Dover, Kent, United Kingdom. All fifteen people on board survived. She was on a voyage from Águilas, Spain to London, United Kingdom.
Triton	United Kingdom	The schooner was driven ashore near Kristiansand, Norway. She was on a voyage from Wismar to London.
Virgen del Carma, and an Unnamed vessel	Spain; Flag unknown	The barque collided with another vessel and foundered 16 nautical miles (30 km) south west of the Tuskar Rock. Her crew were got aboard the Connibeg Lightship ( Trinity House ). Virgen del Carma was on a voyage from Liverpool to Havana, Cuba. The other vessel sank with the loss of all hands.
Unnamed	Flag unknown	The ship was driven ashore and wrecked at St Ann's Head Lighthouse, Pembrokeshire, United Kingdom with the loss of all hands.

== 10 January ==
List of shipwrecks: 10 January 1870
Ship	State	Description
Arche d'Alliance	Belgium	The ship was driven ashore near Vlissingen, Zeeland, Netherlands. She was on a voyage from Antwerp to the West Indies.
Auguste Victorine	France	The ship was driven ashore at Rye, Sussex, United Kingdom.
Caterina V	Russia	The ship was abandoned at sea. She was on a voyage from Odesa to Falmouth, Cornwall, United Kingdom.
Clemanthe	United Kingdom	The brig was abandoned in the Atlantic Ocean. Her crew were rescued by the schooner Louisa Caroline (Denmark). Clemanthe was on a voyage from Africa to London.
Jenny	United Kingdom	The ship was driven ashore at Arklow, County Wicklow. Her crew were rescued.
Knowsley	United Kingdom	The barque was driven ashore at Nymindegab, Denmark. Her crew were rescued. She was on a voyage from Hamburg to Newport, Monmouthshire.
Medusa	United Kingdom	The steamship ran aground on the Nore. She was on a voyage from Sunderland, County Durham to London. She was later refloated and resumed her voyage.
Pacific	United Kingdom	The ship was driven ashore and severely damaged near Milford Haven, Pembrokeshire.
Robert and Alexander	United Kingdom	The ship ran aground on the Haaks Sandbank, in the North Sea off the Dutch coast. Her crew were rescued. She was on a voyage from Bassein, India to Bremen.
W. and M. J.	United Kingdom	The ship was wrecked on the Banjaard Sand, in the North Sea off the Dutch coast. Her crew were rescued. She was on a voyage from Middlesbrough, Yorkshire to Newport, Monmouthshire.

== 11 January ==
List of shipwrecks: 11 January 1870
Ship	State	Description
Donna Feliciana	Spain	The ship ran aground on the Longnose Sand, off Kingsgate, Kent, United Kingdom. She was on a voyage from Sunderland, County Durham, United Kingdom to Bilbao.
Euterpe	United States	The steamship was destroyed by fire in Galveston Bay. She was on a voyage from Galveston, Texas to New York.
Gabalva	United Kingdom	The ship was wrecked on a reef off Cabo San Roque, Brazil. Her crew were rescued. She was on a voyage from Boston to Melbourne, Victoria.
Great Britain	United Kingdom	The schooner ran aground on the Foreness Rock, Margate, Kent. She was on a voyage from Hull, Yorkshire to Plymouth, Devon.
Indian Chief	United Kingdom	The ship was driven ashore at Mobile, Alabama. She was on a voyage from Cardiff, Glamorgan to Mobile. She broke up on 18 January.
Susquehanna	United States	The barque ran aground on the Goodwin Sands, Kent. She was on a voyage from Newcastle upon Tyne, Northumberland, United Kingdom to Cartagena, Spain.
William Dent	United Kingdom	The ship was beached on Annobón, Spanish Guinea in a sinking condition with the loss of three of her crew. She was on a voyage from the west coast of Africa to Liverpool, Lancashire.
Unnamed	United Kingdom	The schooner ran aground on the Longnose Sand.

== 12 January ==
List of shipwrecks: 12 January 1870
Ship	State	Description
Berdinkha	United Kingdom	The ship was driven ashore at Redcar, Yorkshire.
General Garibaldi	United Kingdom	The steamship ran aground in the River Tweed.
Mirella	United Kingdom	The ship was destroyed by fire in the Guañape Islands, Peru.
Zamis	United Kingdom	The steamship was driven ashore near Saltfleet, Lincolnshire.

== 13 January ==
List of shipwrecks: 13 January 1870
Ship	State	Description
Albion	United Kingdom	The smack was wrecked on the East Hoyle Sandbank, in Liverpool Bay.
Ann	United Kingdom	The ship ran aground on the Knock Sand. She was refloated.
Ann Elizabeth	United Kingdom	The smack was wrecked on the East Hoyle Sandbank.
Esperance	France	The schooner was driven ashore at Langston, Hampshire, United Kingdom. She was on a voyage from Havre de Grâce, Seine-Inférieure to Guadeloupe.
Glenfladen	United Kingdom	The ship was driven ashore at Burry Port, Glamorgan.
Ludwig	(Russian Empire) Grand Duchy of Finland	The ship was driven ashore and wrecked at "Grenda", near Cette, Hérault, France.
Sarah Horne	United Kingdom	The ship ran aground on the Knock Sand.
Unnamed	United Kingdom	The schooner was driven ashore at Langstone.

== 14 January ==
List of shipwrecks: 14 January 1870
Ship	State	Description
Cloffock	United Kingdom	The ship was driven ashore at "Port Tavira", Spain. She was on a voyage from Gibraltar to Huelva, Spain.
Elizabeth Nicholson	United Kingdom	The ship struck a sunken wreck and foundered in the North Sea off Withernsea, Yorkshire. Her crew were rescued. She was on a voyage from South Shields, County Durham to Havre de Grâce, Seine-Inférieure, France.
Froy Halversen	Flag unknown	The ship was driven ashore. She was on a voyage from Antwerp, Belgium to Syracuse, Sicily, Italy. She was refloated and put back to Antwerp.
Irwell	United Kingdom	The steamship was driven ashore at Whitby, Yorkshire. She was refloated with the assistance of the paddle tug Mariner (United Kingdom) and taken in to South Shields.
Laughing Water	New South Wales	The 411-ton barque, carrying coal from New South Wales to Port Chalmers, hit a submerged rock and sank during a gale south of Te Waewae Bay, New Zealand, on the western approaches to Foveaux Strait. All fifteen on board survived, reaching the mainland near Orepuki in a longboat, though the ship's mate was lost overboard in the same storm two days before the ship was holed. She was on a voyage from Newcastle to Otago, New Zealand.
Therese	France	The ship sank 6 nautical miles (11 km) west of "Dome Island". She was on a voyage from Bilbao, Spain to Havre de Grâce.

== 15 January ==
List of shipwrecks: 15 January 1870
Ship	State	Description
Anna	France	The ship was discovered derelict off Tory Island, County Donegal, United Kingdom. She was subsequently taken in to Liverpool, Lancashire, United Kingdom.
Elizabeth	United Kingdom	The brig struck a sunken wreck and foundered off Withernsea, Yorkshire. Her crew were rescued by the smack Smilax (United Kingdom). Elizabeth was on a voyage from South Shields, County Durham to Havre de Grâce, Seine-Inférieure, France.
Juno	United Kingdom	The steamship was driven ashore near Domesnes, Russia. Fifteen of her crew were taken off by the steamship Napoleon (Flag unknown). Juno was on a voyage from Riga, Russia to Dundee, Forfarshire. She was refloated on 14 February.
Kenilworth	United Kingdom	The ship was wrecked on Sarn Badrig. Eight of her 28 crew were rescued by the Barmouth Lifeboat Ellen ( Royal National Lifeboat Institution), the other twenty were subsequently rescued by the Abersoch Lifeboat. She was on a voyage from New Orleans, Louisiana, United States to Liverpool, Lancashire.

== 16 January ==
List of shipwrecks: 16 January 1870
Ship	State	Description
John Davies	United Kingdom	The ship was wrecked at Pensacola, Florida, United States. Her crew were rescued. She was on a voyage from Liverpool, Lancashire to Pensacola.
Laura	United Kingdom	The vessel sprang a leak and foundered in the English Channel 9 nautical miles (17 km) south of Bridport, Dorset. Her nine crew were rescued. She was on a voyage from Carloforte, Sardinia, Italy to Swansea, Glamorgan.
Unnamed	Flag unknown	The barque was driven ashore at Aigburth, Lancashire.

== 17 January ==
List of shipwrecks: 17 January 1870
Ship	State	Description
Glimpse	United Kingdom	The ship struck a sunken rock off "Guarero" and was holed. She was on a voyage from Middlesbrough, Yorkshire to Trieste. She put in to Ancona, Papal States in a sinking condition.
Hannah	United Kingdom	The brig was damaged by fire at Antwerp, Belgium.
Mediateur	United Kingdom	The ship was beached at Saint-Nazaire, Ille-et-Vilaine.
Pet	United Kingdom	The ship ran aground on the Pennington Spit, off the coast of Hampshire. She was on a voyage from Hull to São Miguel Island, Azores.
Ripple	United Kingdom	The brig was wrecked on the Tuskar Rock. She was on a voyage from Galaţi, Ottoman Empire to Wexford.

== 18 January ==
List of shipwrecks: 18 January 1870
Ship	State	Description
Emily Anna	United Kingdom	The ship departed from Cádiz, Spain for Swansea, Glamorgan. No further trace, presumed foundered with the loss of all hands.
Merces	Danzig	The barque was driven ashore and wrecked at Boulmer, Northumberland, United Kingdom. She was on a voyage from Danzig to Sunderland, County Durham, United Kingdom. She broke up in mid-February.
Nearchus	United Kingdom	The ship foundered in the Atlantic Ocean.

== 19 January ==
List of shipwrecks: 19 January 1870
Ship	State	Description
Carrie A. Clarke	United States	The ship was wrecked on The Elbow, off the coast of Florida.
Discovery	Colony of British Columbia	The ship sank off Thetis Island. She was refloated on 1 February and taken in to Victoria.
Duke of Edinburgh	United Kingdom	The paddle steamer ran aground on Ailsa Craig. Her passengers were taken off by the tug Flying Sylph (United Kingdom). Duke of Edinburgh was on a voyage from Dublin to Glasgow, Renfrewshire. Salvage was subsequently abandoned.
Eliza Corry	United Kingdom	The brig was wrecked near Akita, Japan with the loss of all but her captain. The ship's dog also survived. She was on a voyage from Shanghai, China to Hakodate, Japan.
Intrinsic	United Kingdom	The ship was destroyed by fire at Oran, Algeria.
Persevere	New Zealand	The paddle steamer went aground and was wrecked on a bar at the mouth of the Hokitika River.
Whiff	United Kingdom	The fishing smack was wrecked on the Quern Shoal, off Ramsgate, Kent with the loss of two of her four crew. Survivors were rescued by the Ramsgate Lifeboat Bradford ( Royal National Lifeboat Institution).

== 20 January ==
List of shipwrecks: 20 January 1870
Ship	State	Description
Cestrian	United Kingdom	The ship departed from Sunderland, County Durham for Singapore, Straits Settlements. No further trace, presumed foundered with the loss of all hands.
Coronea	Greece	The paddle tug was severely damaged by a boiler explosion at Galaţi, Ottoman Empire with the loss of six of her seven crew.
Sailor Boy	United Kingdom	The brig was abandoned in the Atlantic Ocean. Her crew were rescued by a barque.

== 21 January ==
List of shipwrecks: 21 January 1870
Ship	State	Description
Fairona	Spain	The steamship was severely damaged by a boiler explosion at Cartagena. She was on a voyage from "Santa Martha" to Cartagena.
Jones Brothers	United Kingdom	The brig collided with the Newarp Lightship ( Trinity House) and was severely damaged. Four of her eight crew got on board the lightship before the brig drifted off. They were subsequently rescued by a lifeboat. Jones Brothers was on a voyage from Middlesbrough, Yorkshire to Newport, Monmouthshire. She subsequently put in to Harwich, Essex.
Larissa	United Kingdom	The barque collided with the Newarp Lightship ( Trinity House). Two of her crew got on board the lightship, from where they were rescued by the Winterton Lifeboat. Larissa was on a voyage from South Shields, County Durham to Trinidad.
Peri	United Kingdom	The ship ran aground on the Knock Sand.

== 22 January ==
List of shipwrecks: 22 January 1870
Ship	State	Description
Alecto	United Kingdom	The schooner was driven ashore at Goswick, Northumberland. Her crew were rescued. She was on a voyage from Montrose, Forfarshire to Plymouth, Devon. Alecto was refloated on 28 January and taken in to Berwick upon Tweed, Northumberland.
Doawiena Timmer	Netherlands	The sloop sank 12 nautical miles (22 km) east south east of the Farne Islands, Northumberland. Her crew survived.
Nicteaux	United Kingdom	The ship caught fire at New Orleans, Louisiana, United States and was scuttled. She was on a voyage from New Orleans to Liverpool, Lancashire.

== 23 January ==
List of shipwrecks: 23 January 1870
Ship	State	Description
Concordia	United Kingdom	The barque was driven ashore and sank at Dog Island, Anguilla. She was on a voyage from Demerara, British Guiana to Liverpool, Lancashire. She subsequently floated and was seen off Tortola, Virgin Islands in mid-March in a capsized condition.
Phoenix	United Kingdom	The ketch was driven ashore near Lydd, Kent. She was on a voyage from Hartlepool, County Durham to Hastings, Sussex. She was refloated and resumed her voyage in a leaky condition.
Vindex	United Kingdom	The ship ran aground at Weymouth, Dorset. She was on a voyage from Taganrog, Russia to Leith, Lothian. She was refloated.

== 24 January ==
List of shipwrecks: 24 January 1870
Ship	State	Description
Brothers and Sisters	United Kingdom	The ship sank off Hartlepool, County Durham. She was on a voyage from Middlesbrough, Yorkshire to South Shields, County Durham.
Faders Minde	Denmark	The ship was wrecked on the Hyllekrog Spit, Lolland. She was on a voyage from Stavreby-on-Gjedser to an English port.
Joshua Jenkins.	United Kingdom	The barque was wrecked on the Haisborough Sands, in the North Sea off the coast of Norfolk. Her crew were rescued by the schooner Fuschia (United Kingdom). Joshua Jenkins was on a voyage from South Shields to Demerara, British Guiana.
USS Oneida	United States Navy	Illustration of the sinking of USS Oneida from 19 March 1870 edition of Frank Leslie's Illustrated Newspaper. The sloop-of-war collided with the steamship Bombay (United Kingdom) off Yokohama, Japan and sank with the loss of 125 of her 216 crew. Survivors were rescued by Japanese fishing boats.
Unnamed	Flag unknown	The ship sank near the Cockle Lightship ( Trinity House).

== 25 January ==
List of shipwrecks: 25 January 1870
Ship	State	Description
A. W. Stevens	United States	The ship departed from New York City for Lisbon, Portugal. No further trace, presumed foundered with the loss of all hands.
Elaine	United Kingdom	The steamship was driven ashore near Cardiff, Glamorgan. She was on a voyage from Cardiff to Southampton, Hampshire.
Hercules	United States	The ship foundered at Gravesend, New York. She was on a voyage from New York City to Yokohama, Japan.
Weather Gage	United States	The fishing schooner was lost on the Georges Bank. Lost with all ten hands.

== 26 January ==
List of shipwrecks: 26 January 1870
Ship	State	Description
City of Buenos Ayres	Argentina	The ship was destroyed by fire off the Ibicuy Islands with the loss of two lives.
Jane and Grace	United Kingdom	The schooner collided with the steamship City of Paris and sank in the Crosby Channel. She was on a voyage from Arklow, County Wicklow to Liverpool, Lancashire.
Restless	United Kingdom	The brig was run down and sunk in Morte Bay by the brigantine Bon Père (France) with the loss of a crew member. Survivors were rescued by Bon Père. Restless was on a voyage from the Isles of Scilly to Cardiff, Glamorgan.

== 27 January ==
List of shipwrecks: 27 January 1870
Ship	State	Description
Austin	United Kingdom	The brigantine ran aground on the Kentish Knock and was abandoned by her crew, who were rescued by Harmony (United Kingdom). Austin was on a voyage from Lisbon, Portugal to Hull, Yorkshire. She was later refloated by some Frenchmen, but ran aground on the Barnard Sand, in the North Sea off the coast of Suffolk and sank. Those on board were rescued by the Kessingland Lifeboat.
Grasshopper	United Kingdom	The schooner was driven ashore and wrecked at Grenada.
Newcastle	United Kingdom	The paddle steamer collided with another vessel and was beached in the River Tyne. Her passengers were taken off by the paddle tug Jubilee (United Kingdom). Newcastle was on a voyage from Hull, Yorkshire to South Shields, County Durham.
Phoenix	United Kingdom	The ketch was driven ashore near Dungeness, Kent. She was on a voyage from Hartlepool, County Durham to St Leonards-on-Sea, Sussex. She was refloated and put in to Hastings, Sussex in a leaky condition.
Saturn	United Kingdom	The schooner was driven ashore at Whitburn, County Durham. She was on a voyage from Zierikzee, Zeeland, Netherlands to the River Tyne. She was refloated with assistance from a tug and taken into the River Tyne.

== 28 January ==
List of shipwrecks: 28 January 1870
Ship	State	Description
Agenoria, and Iona	United States; United Kingdom	The steamship Iona collided with the barque Agenoria in the River Thames at Gravesend, Kent and was severely damaged. A passenger on board Iona was killed. She was on a voyage from Leith, Lothian to London. Agenoria was also severely damaged. She put back to London.
Ansell	Canada	The barque foundered in the Atlantic Ocean 300 nautical miles (560 km) off Cape Clear Island, County Cork, United Kingdom. Her nineteen crew took to two boats. One boat with eight crew reached land safely. Eleven crew in the second boat were lost when it capsized. Ansell was on a voyage from London to Boston, Massachusetts, United States.
Behrend	Flag unknown	The ship departed from Bordeaux, Gironde, France for Yokohama, Empire of Japan. Presumed subsequently foundered in the Bay of Biscay with the loss of all hands; wreckage including cargo from the ship washed ashore at Vannes, Morbihan, France.
Cestrian	United Kingdom	The ship departed from Sunderland, County Durham for Singapore, Straits Settlements. No further trace, presumed foundered with the loss of all hands.
Unnmed	Flag unknown	The full-rigged ship was driven ashore on the Isle of Harris, Outer Hebrides, United Kingdom.

== 29 January ==
List of shipwrecks: 29 January 1870
Ship	State	Description
Abby Thaxter	United States	The ship was driven ashore near Portsmouth, Hampshire, United Kingdom. She was on a voyage from Boston, Massachusetts to Portland, Dorset, United Kingdom.
Balona	United Kingdom	The ship foundered with the loss of all hands, according to a message in a bottle washed up at Camber, Sussex on 28 February.
Elise	United Kingdom	The ship ran aground on the Wustrow Reef. She was on a voyage from Clackmannan to Wismar.
Eliza	United Kingdom	The Mersey Flat was run into by the schooner Urania (United Kingdom) with the loss of one of the three people on board. Survivors were rescued by the Mersey Flat Adah and the schooner Cesterian (both United Kingdom).
Eusell	Canada	The barque foundered off Cape Clear Island, county Cork, United Kingdom. Eight of her 25 crew reached land in their boat. The rest were reported missing.
Glanmire	United Kingdom	The ship caught fire and was severely damaged in the Rio Grande do Norte. She was scuttled.
Zwollen	Netherlands	The steamship was driven ashore near "Carven". She was on a voyage from "Moch" to Memel, Prussia.

== 30 January ==
List of shipwrecks: 30 January 1870
Ship	State	Description
Camden	United Kingdom	The ship was wrecked on a reef off the mouth of the Clyde River. Her crew were rescued. She was on a voyage from London to Sydney, New South Wales.
Cruiser	United Kingdom	The paddle tug ran aground in Porlock Bay. She subsequently broke up.
Margarets	United Kingdom	The brig was driven ashore at Middleton, County Durham. She was on a voyage from Dieppe, Seine-Inférieure, France to Hartlepool, County Durham. She was refloated and towed in to West Hartlepool, County Durham by the tug Conqueror (United Kingdom).
North Star	United Kingdom	The paddle tug caught fire and sank at Newcastle upon Tyne, Northumberland.
Pauline David	United Kingdom	The ship was driven ashore at Campbeltown, Argyllshire. She was on a voyage from Liverpool, Lancashire to Troon, Ayrshire. She was refloated.
Queen of the Isles	United Kingdom	The schooner was driven ashore in Lough Foyle.
Royalist	United Kingdom	The schooner was run into by the steamship Coral Queen (United Kingdom) at West Hartlepool. She was consequently beached.
Unnamed	Flag unknown	The ship sank in the North Sea off the coast of Lincolnshire. Her crew were rescued by the Theddlethorpe Lifeboat Dorinda and Barbara ( Royal National Lifeboat Institution).

== 31 January ==
List of shipwrecks: 31 January 1870
Ship	State	Description
Florence Pope	United Kingdom	The brig was abandoned in the Atlantic Ocean. Two of her four crew died before the survivors landed on Inishturk, County Mayo on 4 February. She was on a voyage from Lagos, Africa to Liverpool, Lancashire.
Kelpie	Canada	The ship was wrecked near Milford Haven, Pembrokeshire, United Kingdom with the loss of all but two of her crew. She was on a voyage from Newport, Monmouthshire, United Kingdom to Liverpool.
Razetto	Italy	The barque was driven ashore at Mablethorpe Lincolnshire, United Kingdom. She was on a voyage from Newcastle upon Tyne, Northumberland, United Kingdom to Genoa.
River King	United Kingdom	The smack was run into by the smack Argo and was abandoned off the coast of Yorkshire. Her crew were rescued by Argo before she sank.
Unnamed	United Kingdom	The Mersey Flat capsized and sank off Hilbre Point, Cheshire.

== Unknown date ==
List of shipwrecks: Unknown date in January 1870
Ship	State	Description
Amy	United Kingdom	The smack ran aground on the Heaps Sand, in the North Sea off the cost of Essex. Her seven crew got on board the Swin Middle Lightship ( Trinity House), from where they were rescued by the smack Alma (United Kingdom).
Anna	United Kingdom	The brig was driven ashore at Agrigento, Sicily, Italy on or before 6 January.
Anne Royden	United Kingdom	The ship ran aground in the Pass a l'Outre. She was on a voyage from Liverpool, Lancashire to New Orleans, Louisiana, United States.
SMS Arcona	Prussian Navy	The frigate ran aground at Malta on or before 5 January and was damaged. She was taken in to Malta for repairs.
Aurelania	United Kingdom	The ship was driven ashore at "Camarines" before 6 January. She was on a voyage from Sulina, Ottoman Empire to Falmouth, Cornwall.
Carlotta	Sweden	The ship was driven ashore near Constantinople, Ottoman Empire. She was refloated.
Carolina	United Kingdom	The ship was driven ashore and wrecked at Fredrikshavn, Denmark with the loss of five of her crew.
Caroline Cornelia	Flag unknown	The ship was driven ashore and wrecked at "Terra Nuova".
Cenzres	Chile	The ship was lost at "Paperdo".
City of Boston	United Kingdom	The iron hulled steamship with approximately 200 passengers and crew sailed from Halifax bound for Liverpool on January 28 and vanished without trace. A severe winter storm was reported in the area on January 30.
Cleaton	United Kingdom	The steamship ran aground in the Suez Canal. She was on a voyage from Liverpool to Bombay, India. She was later refloated and resumed her voyage.
Clementina	United Kingdom	The brig was abandoned in the Atlantic Ocean 20 nautical miles (37 km) south east of Ouessant, Finistère, France on or before 14 January.
Comet	United Kingdom	The ship was wrecked at Maceió, Brazil.
Delaware	United Kingdom	The steamship ran aground on the Mitchka Sandbank, off Cape Carabournou, Ottoman Empire. She was on a voyage from Syros to Thessaloniki, Greece. She was refloated and resumed her voyage.
Eclipse	United States	The ship was driven ashore at "Woodsend". She was on a voyage from the Turks Islands to Boston, Massachusetts.
E. Holley	United Kingdom	The ship was driven ashore and wrecked at Rio de Janeiro, Brazil.
Express	Prussia	The ship departed from Gravesend, Kent, United Kingdom for Livorno, Italy between 23 and 28 January. No further trace, presumed foundered with the loss of all hands.
Fairwater	United Kingdom	The steamship was reported to have collided with another vessel and foundered between 6 and 20 January. She may also have foundered on 7 January. Her crew were reported missing, presumed lost. She was on a voyage from Penarth, Glamorgan to Cork.
Filey	United Kingdom	The brig sprang a leak and foundered on or before 6 January. Her crew were rescued by Bury St. Edmunds. Filey was on a voyage from South Shields to Oran, Algeria.
Fourteen	United Kingdom	The ship was abandoned in the Atalantic Ocean. She was on a voyage from New York to Havre de Grâce, Seine-Inférieure France.
Fred Nicholas	United States	The ship was driven ashore near Cádiz, Spain. She was on a voyage from New York to Cádiz.
Grassendale	United Kingdom	The ship foundered. Her crew were rescued by the barque Santiago (United Kingdom).
Guerrier	France	The barque collided with another vessel and sank. Her crew were rescued by Zedora (United Kingdom).
Her Majesty	United Kingdom	The ship was driven ashore at Dungeness, Kent before 14 January. She was on a voyage from New York to London. She was refloated and taken in to for London.
Herman Mendel	Norway	The brig was abandoned in the North Sea before 29 January.
H. M. No. 1, or No. 1	France	The ship foundered on 10 or 27 January. Her crew were rescued by the brig Escort (United Kingdom). No. 1 was on a voyage from Taganrog, Russia to Falmouth or Queenstown, County Cork, United Kingdom.
Howard	United Kingdom	The brig ran aground in the Congo River. She was on a voyage from the Congo River to Liverpool. She was refloated 10 days later.
Knightbrigde	United Kingdom	The ship was destroyed by fire off the coast of Ceylon. Her crew survived. She was on a voyage from Sunderland, County Durham to Bombay.
Lautong	United Kingdom	The barque was driven ashore on Samar, Spanish East Indies. She was on a voyage from Manila, Spanish East Indies to Shanghai, China.
Maria Aurora	United Kingdom	The ship was driven ashore near "Djokalf". she was on a voyage from Riga to Newport, Monmouthshire. She was refloated and taken in to "Calversund" in a waterlogged condition.
Maria J. Smith	United Kingdom	The ship was driven ashore in Barclay Sound. She was on a voyage from Puget Sound to Australia. She later floated off and was sighted off Cape Flattery, Washington Territory.
Marie and Alice	United Kingdom	The ship was wrecked in the North Sea off Terschelling, Friesland, Netherlands before 26 January.
Marie Gabrielle	United Kingdom	The barque was wrecked at Moonlight Head, Victoria. Her crew were rescued. She was on a voyage from Foo Chow Foo, China to Melbourne, Victoria.
Martha	Newfoundland Colony	The ship was driven ashore and wrecked at Beaver River, Nova Scotia, Canada. She was on a voyage from Saint John's to Cárdenas, Cuba.
May Queen	United Kingdom	The ship was wrecked at Pensacola. She was on a voyage from Havana, Cuba to Pensacola.
Mermaid	United States	The ship was driven ashore at Mobile, Alabama. She was on a voyage from Mobile to Pensacola, Florida.
Minnesota	United Kingdom	The steamship was driven ashore. She was on a voyage from New York to Liverpool.
Morning Star	United States	The missionary ship was wrecked on Strong's Island. All on board survived.
Osmyn	United Kingdom	The barque was driven ashore in Paget Sound.
Percy	United Kingdom	The barque was driven ashore at Agrigento on or before 6 January with the loss of a crew member.
Peru	United Kingdom	The ship ran aground on the Bombay Shoal before 25 January. She was on a voyage from Amoy, China to Singapore, Straits Settlements.
Progress	France	The ship was driven ashore at "Robekin", Senegal. She was on a voyage from Bordeaux, Gironde to La Rochelle, Charente-Inférieure.
Robert Jones	United Kingdom	The ship was wrecked at Cabinda, Portuguese West Africa. She was on a voyage from Cardiff, Glamorgan to St-Paul de Loanda, Portuguese West Africa.
Princess Alexandra	United Kingdom	The steamship ran aground. she was on a voyage from Hull, Yorkshire to Pillau, Prussia. She was refloated and completed her voyage in a leaky condition, arriving at Pillau on 9 January.
Providence	United Kingdom	The ship foundered in the Atlantic Ocean 40 nautical miles (74 km) off Maldonado, Uruguay. She was on a voyage from Cardiff to Buenos Aires, Argentina.
Skylark	United States	The ship was driven ashore in the Dardanelles. She was on a voyage from New York to Constantinople. She was refloated with assistance.
Smidt	Bremen	The steamship departed from Bremen for New York in late January. No further trace, presumed foundered with the loss of all on board, more than 300 lives.
Tessithea	Greece	The ship ran aground on the Longsand, in the North Sea off the coast of Essex. Her crew were rescued by the smack Ranger (United Kingdom).
Union	United Kingdom	The ship was taken in to A Coruña, Spain in a derelict condition by Bohemian Girl (United Kingdom).
Victeaux	United Kingdom	The ship was destroyed by fire at New Orleans. She was on a voyage from New Orleans to Liverpool.
Viking	United States	The fishing schooner sailed from Gloucester, Massachusetts for the Grand Banks and vanished. Lost with all eleven hands.
Vincenzo	Italy	The ship was abandoned. Her crew were rescued by the steamship Milan (United Kingdom).
What Cheer	United Kingdom	The ship was wrecked on Banguey Island, Malaya before 20 January. She was subsequently plundered and burnt by the local inhabitants.
Yarrow	United Kingdom	The ship was abandoned in the Mediterranean Sea before 20 January. Her crew were rescued by HMS Himalaya (Royal Navy).
