= Masonic Opera House =

- U.S. National Register of Historic Places
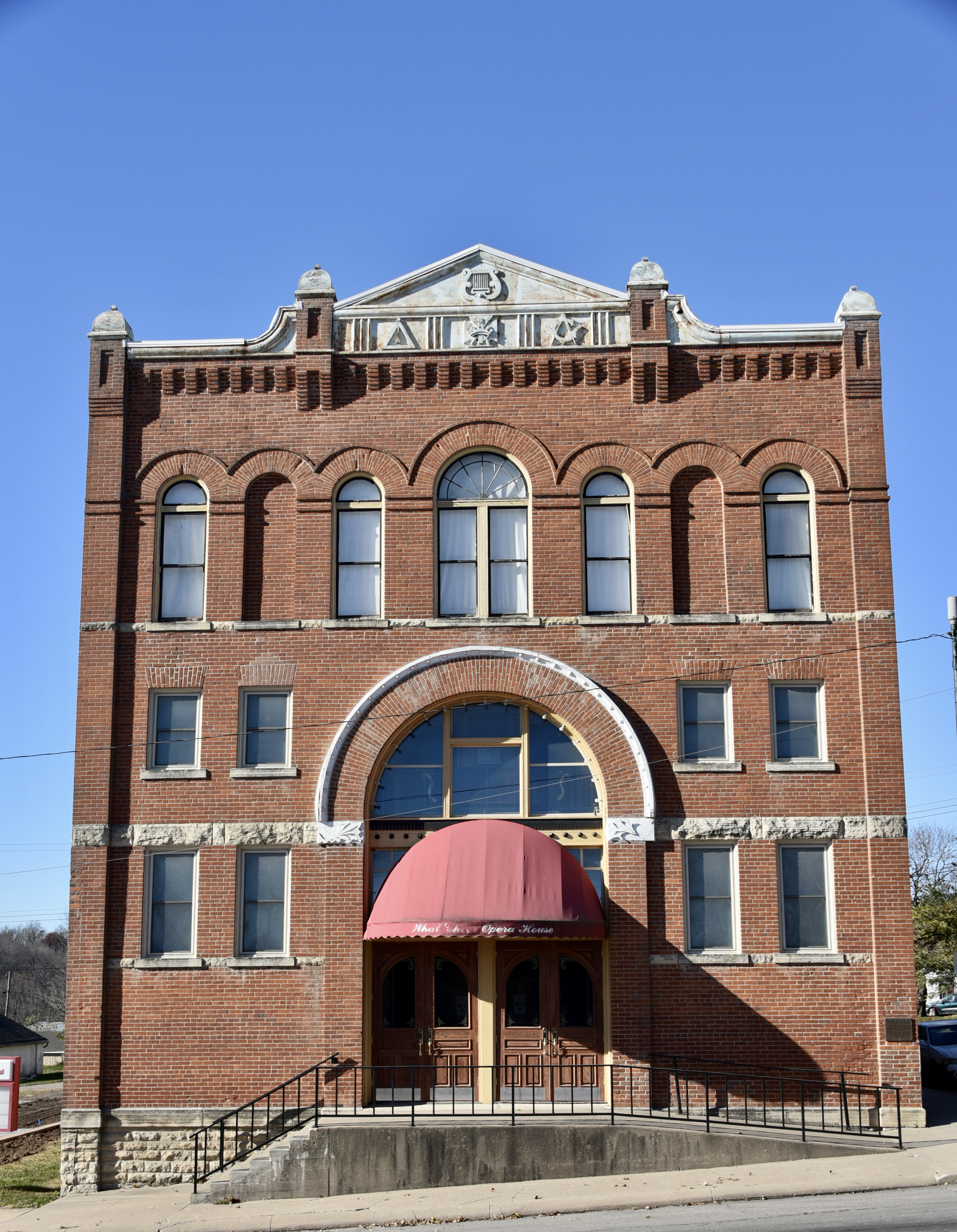

- Location within Iowa Location within the United States
- Location: 201 Barnes St. What Cheer, Iowa
- Coordinates: 41°24′5″N 92°21′17″W
- Area: less than one acre
- Built: 1893
- Architectural style: Romanesque Revival
- NRHP reference No.: 73000733
- Added to NRHP: June 4, 1973

The Masonic Opera House, also known as the What Cheer Opera House, is a historic building located in What Cheer, Iowa, United States. It is a Romanesque Revival style building from 1893. The 100-by-50-foot (30 by 15 m) facility has served as a clubhouse, an auditorium, a music facility, and a cinema. The third floor originally housed a Masonic hall. Emblems associated with Freemasonry are still located on a decorative pediment at the top of the building. The auditorium seats 350 on the main floor, and 240 in the balcony. The second floor served the balcony patrons. It was listed on the National Register of Historic Places in 1973.
