= Sigourney, Iowa =

- City
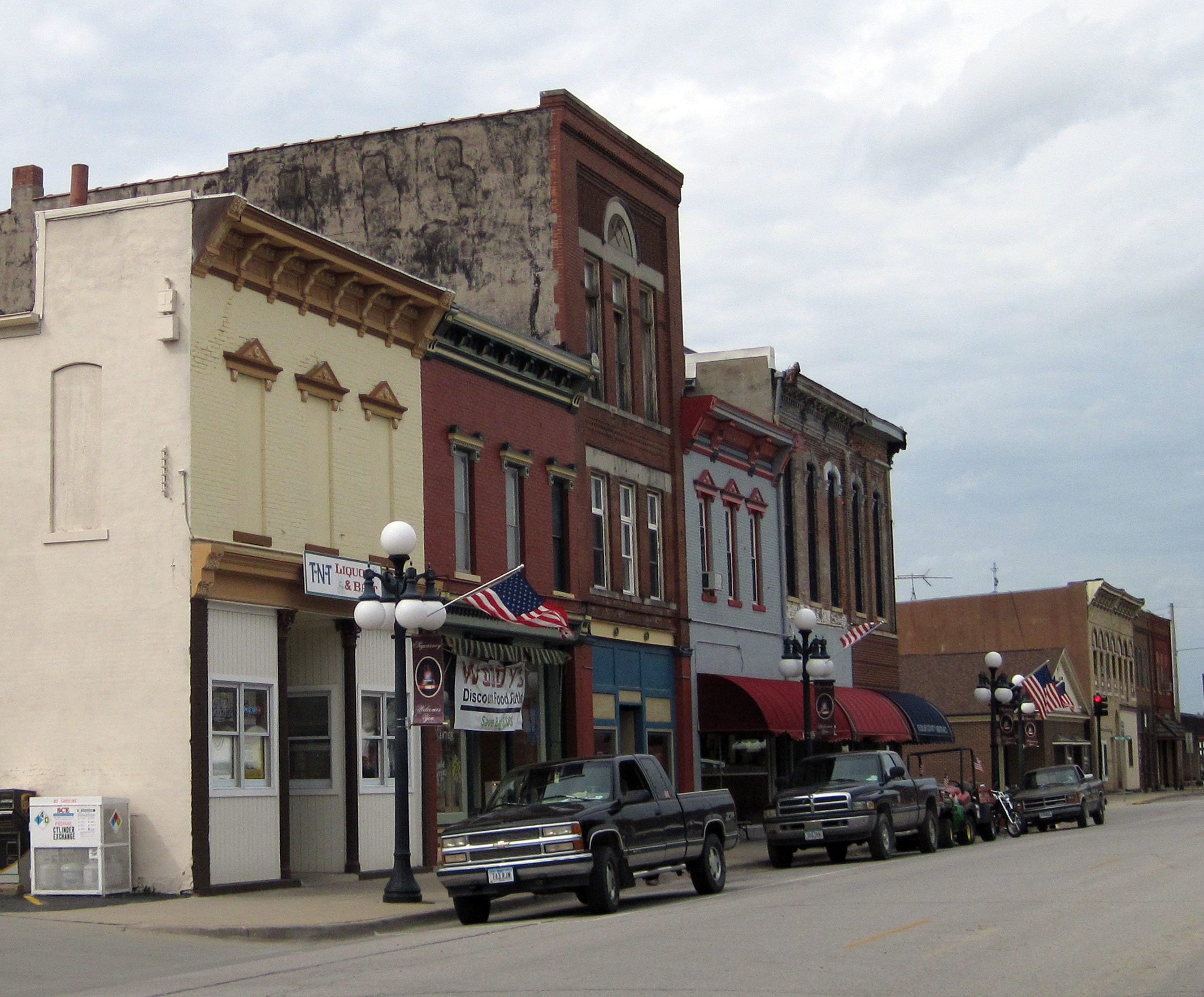
- Public Square Historic District
- Motto: Where tradition meets tomorrow
- Location of Sigourney, Iowa
- Coordinates: 41°20′02″N 92°12′16″W
- Country: United States
- State: Iowa
- County: Keokuk

Area
  - Total: 2.16 sq mi (5.60 km^{2})
  - Land: 2.16 sq mi (5.60 km^{2})
  - Water: 0 sq mi (0.00 km^{2})
- Elevation: 794 ft (242 m)

Population (2020)
  - Total: 2,004
  - Density: 926.3/sq mi (357.64/km^{2})
- Time zone: UTC-6 (Central (CST))
  - Summer (DST): UTC-5 (CDT)
- ZIP code: 52591
- Area code: 641
- FIPS code: 19-73110
- GNIS feature ID: 2395884
- Website: sigourney.com

Sigourney (/ˈsɪɡərni/ SIG-ər-nee) is a city and the county seat of Keokuk County, Iowa, United States. The population was 2,004 at the time of the 2020 census. Keokuk County Courthouse is located in the Public Square Historic District. Both are on the National Register of Historic Places.

== History ==
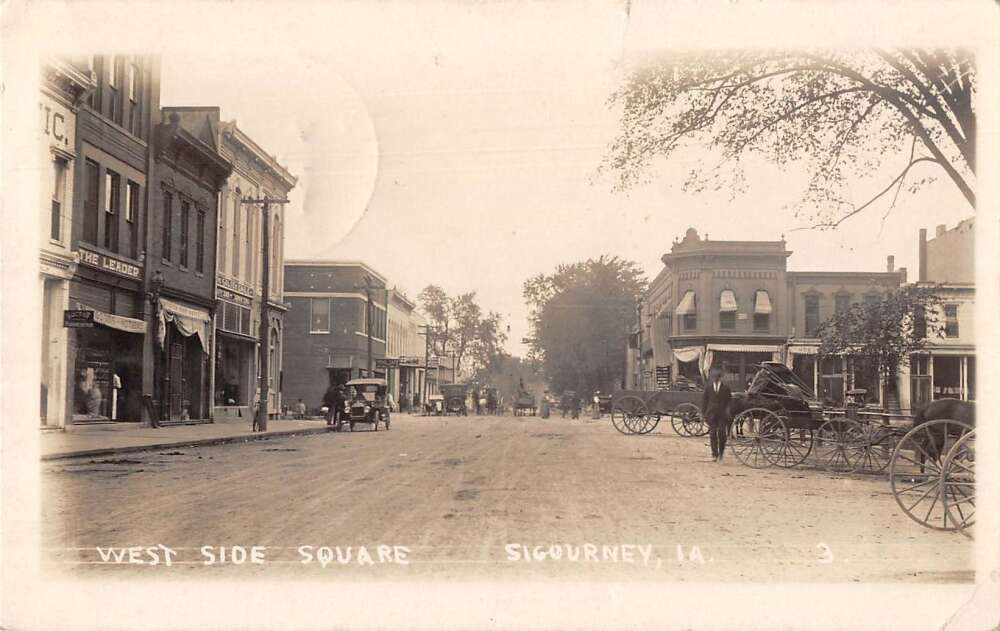
Sigourney, Iowa in a photo postcard sent on August 16, 1915

Keokuk County was opened for Euro-American settlement in 1843, and the town got its start in 1844 when S.A. James built the first cabin there. Other families began to settle there as well, and in 1844, the town was named by county commissioner Dr. George H. Stone in honor of popular poet Lydia Sigourney. A large oil-painted portrait of her still graces the foyer of the county courthouse.

== Geography ==
According to the United States Census Bureau, the city has a total area of 2.18 square miles (5.65 km^{2}), all of it land.

=== Climate ===
According to the Köppen Climate Classification system, Sigourney has a hot-summer humid continental climate, abbreviated "Dfa" on climate maps. The hottest temperature recorded in Sigourney was 113 °F (45.0 °C) on July 22, 1901, while the coldest temperature recorded was −32 °F (−35.6 °C) on January 31, 2019.

Climate data for Sigourney, Iowa, 1991–2020 normals, extremes 1896–present
Month	Jan	Feb	Mar	Apr	May	Jun	Jul	Aug	Sep	Oct	Nov	Dec	Year
Record high °F (°C)	70 (21)	77 (25)	86 (30)	93 (34)	106 (41)	105 (41)	113 (45)	111 (44)	103 (39)	95 (35)	81 (27)	74 (23)	113 (45)
Mean maximum °F (°C)	53.2 (11.8)	57.9 (14.4)	72.5 (22.5)	81.3 (27.4)	86.8 (30.4)	91.2 (32.9)	94.6 (34.8)	93.7 (34.3)	90.0 (32.2)	83.6 (28.7)	69.6 (20.9)	56.7 (13.7)	96.3 (35.7)
Mean daily maximum °F (°C)	29.8 (−1.2)	34.6 (1.4)	47.6 (8.7)	60.7 (15.9)	71.0 (21.7)	80.6 (27.0)	84.6 (29.2)	82.8 (28.2)	76.4 (24.7)	63.4 (17.4)	48.2 (9.0)	35.3 (1.8)	59.6 (15.3)
Daily mean °F (°C)	20.7 (−6.3)	24.8 (−4.0)	37.0 (2.8)	48.9 (9.4)	60.0 (15.6)	69.8 (21.0)	73.6 (23.1)	71.6 (22.0)	64.1 (17.8)	51.6 (10.9)	38.0 (3.3)	26.5 (−3.1)	48.9 (9.4)
Mean daily minimum °F (°C)	11.5 (−11.4)	15.1 (−9.4)	26.3 (−3.2)	37.2 (2.9)	49.1 (9.5)	59.1 (15.1)	62.7 (17.1)	60.4 (15.8)	51.7 (10.9)	39.8 (4.3)	27.7 (−2.4)	17.7 (−7.9)	38.2 (3.4)
Mean minimum °F (°C)	−9.8 (−23.2)	−4.6 (−20.3)	6.5 (−14.2)	24.1 (−4.4)	35.4 (1.9)	48.0 (8.9)	54.3 (12.4)	51.7 (10.9)	38.0 (3.3)	24.6 (−4.1)	11.4 (−11.4)	−1.6 (−18.7)	−13.6 (−25.3)
Record low °F (°C)	−32 (−36)	−30 (−34)	−20 (−29)	7 (−14)	24 (−4)	35 (2)	45 (7)	39 (4)	16 (−9)	4 (−16)	−9 (−23)	−30 (−34)	−32 (−36)
Average precipitation inches (mm)	1.18 (30)	1.47 (37)	2.34 (59)	3.70 (94)	4.95 (126)	5.11 (130)	3.93 (100)	4.76 (121)	3.47 (88)	2.78 (71)	2.18 (55)	1.54 (39)	37.41 (950)
Average snowfall inches (cm)	7.6 (19)	8.7 (22)	3.8 (9.7)	0.6 (1.5)	0.0 (0.0)	0.0 (0.0)	0.0 (0.0)	0.0 (0.0)	0.0 (0.0)	0.5 (1.3)	2.0 (5.1)	6.4 (16)	29.6 (74.6)
Average precipitation days (≥ 0.01 in)	5.7	6.4	7.3	9.4	11.8	11.6	8.2	8.8	7.4	7.6	6.5	5.9	96.6
Average snowy days (≥ 0.1 in)	3.9	3.7	1.7	0.3	0.0	0.0	0.0	0.0	0.0	0.1	0.9	3.1	13.7
Source 1: NOAA
Source 2: National Weather Service

== Demographics ==
Historical populations
Year	Pop.	±%
1850	162	—
1870	992	+512.3%
1880	1,735	+74.9%
1890	1,523	−12.2%
1900	1,952	+28.2%
1910	2,032	+4.1%
1920	2,210	+8.8%
1930	2,262	+2.4%
1940	2,355	+4.1%
1950	2,343	−0.5%
1960	2,387	+1.9%
1970	2,319	−2.8%
1980	2,330	+0.5%
1990	2,111	−9.4%
2000	2,209	+4.6%
2010	2,059	−6.8%
2020	2,004	−2.7%
Source:"U.S. Census website". United States Census Bureau. and Iowa Data Center; Source: U.S. Decennial Census

=== 2020 census ===
As of the 2020 census, Sigourney had a population of 2,004, with 880 households and 513 families residing in the city. The population density was 926.3 inhabitants per square mile (357.6/km^{2}), and there were 972 housing units at an average density of 449.3 per square mile (173.5/km^{2}).

The median age was 45.7 years. 20.3% of residents were under the age of 18. 22.1% of residents were under the age of 20; 5.1% were between the ages of 20 and 24; 22.1% were from 25 to 44; 24.3% were from 45 to 64; and 26.5% were 65 years of age or older. The gender makeup of the city was 47.5% male and 52.5% female. For every 100 females there were 90.5 males, and for every 100 females age 18 and over there were 88.3 males age 18 and over.

Of households, 24.5% had children under the age of 18 living in them. 43.8% were married-couple households, 7.7% were cohabiting-couple households, 18.4% were households with a male householder and no spouse or partner present, and 30.1% were households with a female householder and no spouse or partner present. About 41.7% of households were non-families, 36.3% of all households were made up of individuals, and 20.3% had someone living alone who was 65 years of age or older.

Of all housing units, 9.5% were vacant. The homeowner vacancy rate was 2.0% and the rental vacancy rate was 7.9%.

0.0% of residents lived in urban areas, while 100.0% lived in rural areas.

Racial composition as of the 2020 census
Race	Number	Percent
White	1,895	94.6%
Black or African American	18	0.9%
American Indian and Alaska Native	2	0.1%
Asian	4	0.2%
Native Hawaiian and Other Pacific Islander	0	0.0%
Some other race	20	1.0%
Two or more races	65	3.2%
Hispanic or Latino (of any race)	38	1.9%

=== 2010 census ===
As of the census of 2010, there were 2,059 people, 878 households, and 537 families living in the city. The population density was 944.5 inhabitants per square mile (364.7/km^{2}). There were 987 housing units at an average density of 452.8 per square mile (174.8/km^{2}). The racial makeup of the city was 98.2% White, 0.7% African American, 0.2% Native American, 0.3% Asian, 0.1% from other races, and 0.4% from two or more races. Hispanic or Latino people of any race were 0.4% of the population.

There were 878 households, of which 27.8% had children under the age of 18 living with them, 47.5% were married couples living together, 9.5% had a female householder with no husband present, 4.2% had a male householder with no wife present, and 38.8% were non-families. 34.3% of all households were made up of individuals, and 18.7% had someone living alone who was 65 years of age or older. The average household size was 2.23 and the average family size was 2.85.

The median age in the city was 45.1 years. 22.5% of residents were under the age of 18; 6.6% were between the ages of 18 and 24; 20.8% were from 25 to 44; 24.9% were from 45 to 64; and 25.2% were 65 years of age or older. The gender makeup of the city was 47.0% male and 53.0% female.

=== 2000 census ===
As of the census of 2000, there were 2,209 people, 903 households, and 567 families living in the city. The population density was 1,016.3 inhabitants per square mile (392.4/km^{2}). There were 992 housing units at an average density of 456.4 per square mile (176.2/km^{2}). The racial makeup of the city was 99.09% White, 0.14% African American, 0.14% Native American, 0.45% Asian, 0.14% from other races, and 0.05% from two or more races. Hispanic or Latino people of any race were 0.54% of the population.

There were 903 households, out of which 29.6% had children under the age of 18 living with them, 51.4% were married couples living together, 9.0% had a female householder with no husband present, and 37.1% were non-families. 33.6% of all households were made up of individuals, and 21.5% had someone living alone who was 65 years of age or older. The average household size was 2.29 and the average family size was 2.93.

Age spread: 23.9% under the age of 18, 7.9% from 18 to 24, 22.7% from 25 to 44, 18.8% from 45 to 64, and 26.7% who were 65 years of age or older. The median age was 42 years. For every 100 females, there were 79.7 males. For every 100 females age 18 and over, there were 75.8 males.

The median income for a household in the city was $29,803, and the median income for a family was $43,519. Males had a median income of $29,783 versus $21,078 for females. The per capita income for the city was $17,218. About 8.5% of families and 10.8% of the population were below the poverty line, including 14.0% of those under age 18 and 10.7% of those age 65 or over.

== Government ==
Sigourney is represented by Rep. Mariannette Miller-Meeks in the United States House of Representatives.

== Education ==
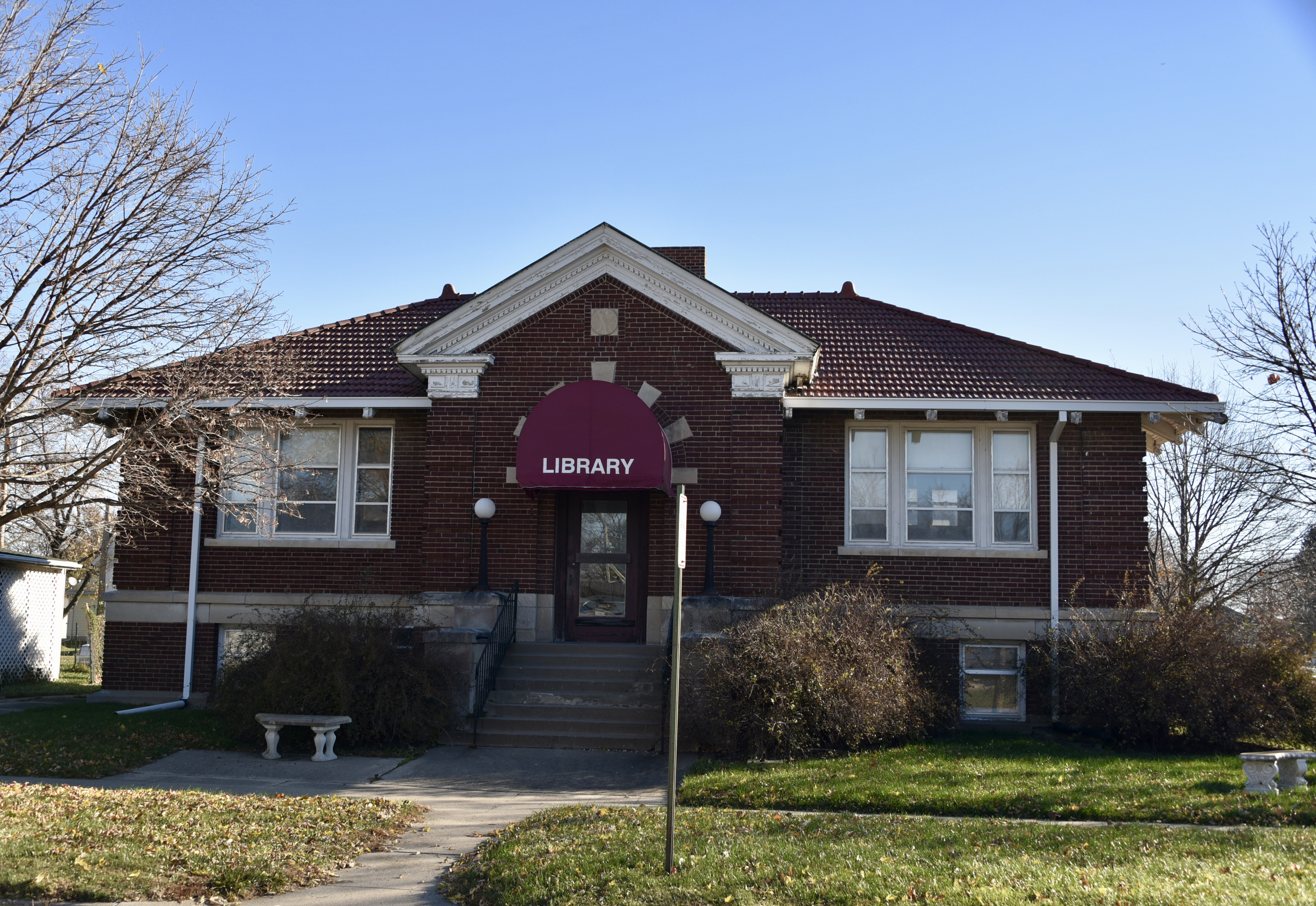
Library

The Sigourney Community School District encompasses nearly a 70-square-mile (180 km^{2}) radius, drawing students from smaller surrounding communities. Approximately 700 students are enrolled yearly, with an average of 350 attending elementary (K-6) and 350 students attending junior/senior high (7-12). The average graduating class is 50 students with 80% moving on to college. The school system's mascot is the Sigourney Savage.

The public library is the Sigourney Public Library.

== Notable people ==
- William Lawrence Adrian (1883–1972), Roman Catholic bishop
- Ambrose Burke (1895–1998), Roman Catholic priest and educator
- John Burke (1859–1938) tenth governor of North Dakota, United States Treasurer, North Dakota Supreme Court justice
- Katharine Goeldner, opera singer
- S.J. Mathes (1849–1927), newspaperman
- Ernest L. Parker (1864–1934), 13th Lieutenant Governor of Idaho
- Dan Peiffer (born 1951) NFL football player
- Ezekiel S. Sampson (1831–1896), district judge and U.S. Representative
