= What Cheer, Iowa =

- City
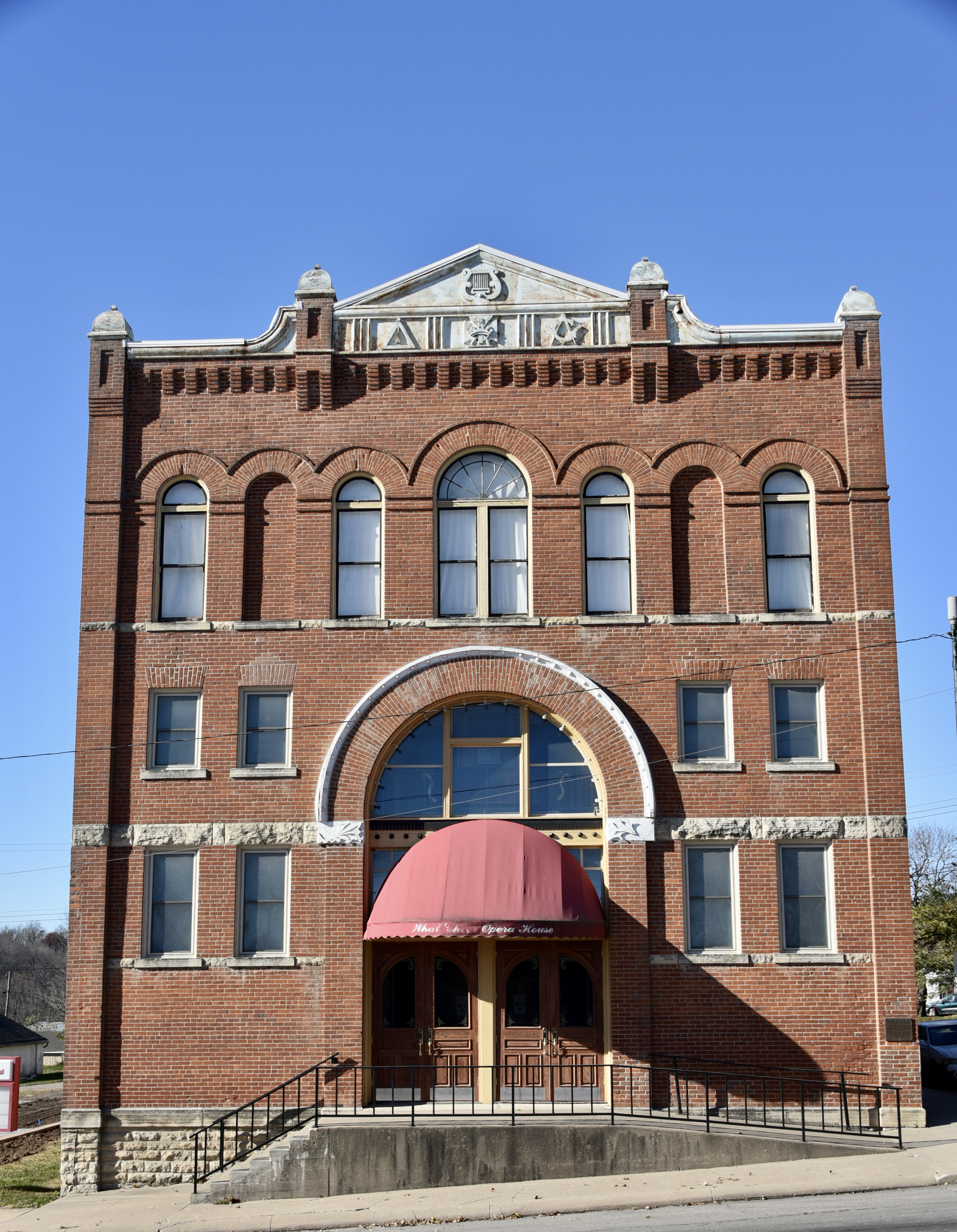
- What Cheer Opera House

- Location of What Cheer, Iowa
- Coordinates: 41°23′59″N 92°21′17″W
- Country: United States
- State: Iowa
- County: Keokuk

Area
  - Total: 1.25 sq mi (3.25 km^{2})
  - Land: 1.24 sq mi (3.20 km^{2})
  - Water: 0.019 sq mi (0.05 km^{2})
- Elevation: 751 ft (229 m)

Population (2020)
  - Total: 607
  - Density: 490.6/sq mi (189.43/km^{2})
- Time zone: UTC-6 (Central (CST))
  - Summer (DST): UTC-5 (CDT)
- ZIP Code: 50268
- Area code: 641
- FIPS code: 19-84900
- GNIS feature ID: 2397291

What Cheer (/hwəˈtʃɪər, hwʌtˈtʃɪər, ˈhwɒtʃɪər, ˈhwættʃɪər/) is a city in Keokuk County, Iowa, United States. It is a former coal town, and from the 1870s to the early 1900s was one of the major coal-producing centers of Iowa. Its greatest recorded population was 3,246, in the 1890 census. The population was 607 in the 2020 census.

== Naming ==
What Cheer was founded in 1865 as Petersburg, named after Peter Britton, its founder. This name was rejected by the Post Office, forcing a change of name. Joseph Andrews, a major and veteran of the American Civil War, suggested the name "What Cheer," and the town was officially renamed on December 1, 1879.

Sources differ as to why the name What Cheer was chosen. The phrase what cheer with you is an ancient English greeting dating back at least to the 15th century. One theory of the name is that a Scottish miner exclaimed What cheer! on discovering a coal seam near town.

A more elaborate theory suggests that Joseph Andrews chose the name based on a founding myth from his native Providence, Rhode Island. According to the story, when Roger Williams arrived at the site that would become Providence in 1636, he was greeted by Narragansett people with "What Cheer, Netop". Netop was the Narragansett word for friend, and the Narragansetts had picked up the what cheer greeting from English settlers. It is possible that the connection between What Cheer, Iowa and What Cheer, the shibboleth of Rhode Island, was merely coincidental - the entries for these subjects are adjacent but not connected in the 1908 edition of the Encyclopedia Americana.

What Cheer has frequently been noted on lists of unusual place names.

== History ==
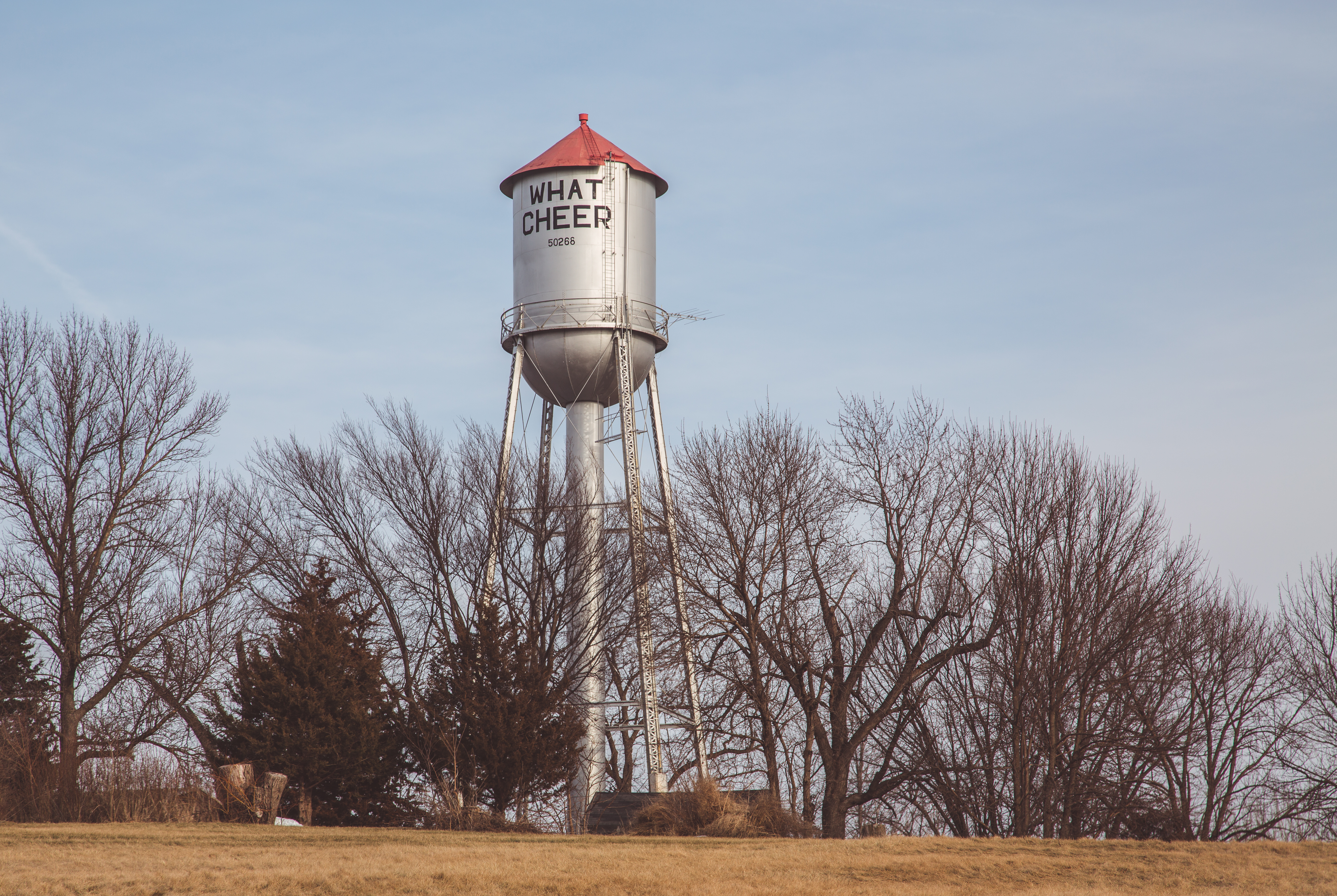
Watertower in What Cheer

Robert Forsyth, born in Kilmarnock, Scotland, came to America in 1857, and made his way to Rock Island, Illinois, where he arrived penniless. He worked for most of a decade as a coal miner before coming to Petersburg, the future What Cheer. In the 1870s, he began buying coal lands around town, mostly on credit. When the railroad came to town, he leased his land to the coal companies and bought into a local drug store, eventually operating stores in What Cheer, Mystic and Jerome, Iowa. Other Scots from the Kilmarnock region (Ayrshire) also settled in the area. Robert Orr came in 1875 after working in the coal mines of Colchester, Illinois. His son Alexander went on a successful career as a mine owner in Mystic.

The Burlington, Cedar Rapids and Northern Railway (BCR&N) built a 66-mile (106 km) branch to What Cheer in 1879. With the arrival of the railroad, the What Cheer coalfield quickly became one of the most important coal mining centers in Iowa. The Starr Coal Company had over 200 employees and could produce 1,000 tons of coal per day. By 1883, they were operating three mines and took over several others. When, in 1884, the Chicago and North Western Railway built its line through What Cheer to Muchakinock, there was a further expansion of mining in the area.

Local Assembly 1474 of the Knights of Labor was based in What Cheer and had a membership of 65 in 1884. On Oct. 15, 1884, 500 miners in What Cheer went on strike, demanding higher wages. The established wage was 3 cents per bushel, and the miners demanded an additional half cent. The state militia was put on alert, but after 6 weeks, the miners accepted a quarter-cent raise. This strike cut coal production in the What Cheer significantly.

In 1886, the What Cheer Coal Company began to consolidate the local mines, buying up the Starr Coal Company and the Granger Coal Company. In 1887, they employed 1,100 miners, and they continued to operate until 1899. From 1885 to 1901, the Crescent Coal Company was an important local producer.

In 1891, the BCR&N Railroad's Iowa City Division, serving What Cheer, carried 38,080 tons of coal, by far the most important commodity carried by that line. In 1892, mines along the BCR&N (all of which were in the What Cheer region) loaded 129,316 tons of coal.

On May 1, 1891, the miners of What Cheer and many other mining towns went on strike for the eight-hour day. 1000 men walked off the job in What Cheer, but returned to work defeated on June 16. On August 15, 1896, the miners struck again over several small grievances. The strike lasted 10 to 12 weeks. Local 841 of the United Mine Workers union was organized in What Cheer in 1897, and in 1902, it had 200 members.

The first industrial development in What Cheer was driven by the needs of the coal mines. In 1890, What Cheer was home to three firms making mining drills, Walker & Thompson, Enterprise Manufacturing and the newly formed What Cheer Drill Company. Within the decade, the What Cheer Drill and Miners' Tool Company was selling equipment in mining districts around the nation. Alexander Walker, originally with Walker & Thompson filed numerous patents on mining equipment, most of which were assigned to the What Cheer Drill and Miners' Tool Company, later named the What Cheer Tool Company. In 1903, the Starr Manufacturing Company, American Mining Tool Company and the What Cheer Tool Company agreed to a union wage scale with the International Brotherhood of Blacksmiths. At the time, the blacksmiths local 259 had just 17 members.

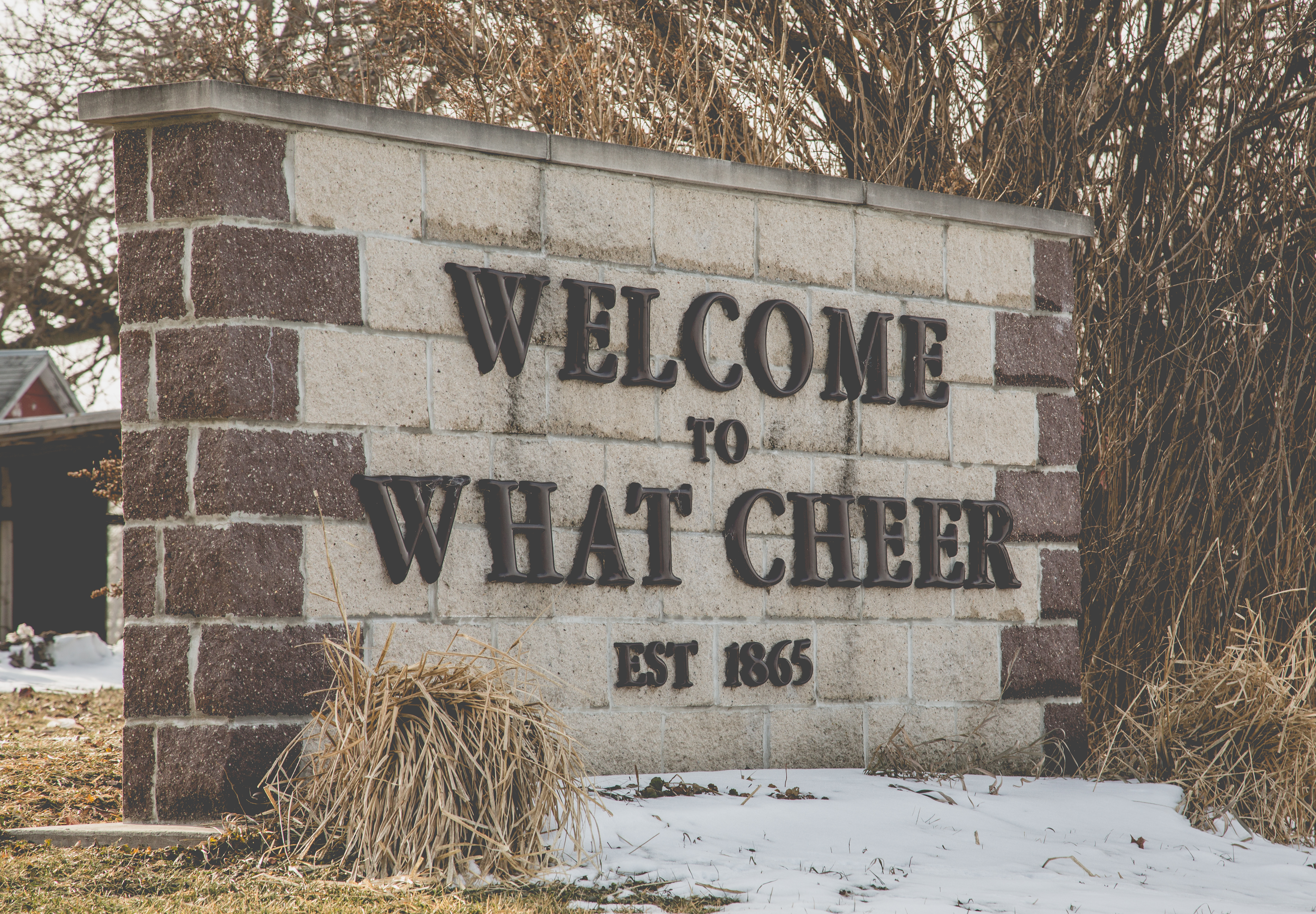
What Cheer welcome sign

In 1907, the Volunteer Brick and Tile company was operating its own coal mine to fuel its kilns. The mine had a steam hoist to lift coal 40 feet from a coal seam from 4 to 5 feet thick. The Lea Brothers' mine in north-central What Cheer also had a steam hoist and still shipped some coal by rail. The remaining mines in the area were all small, using horse-gins to operate their hoists.

By 1909, there were only a few mines left in the county, all producing coal for local consumption in What Cheer. The decline of What Cheer's mines in the 20th century was reflected in declining union membership. In 1912, Local 841 of the United Mine Workers, based in What Cheer, had only 18 members.

The What Cheer Clay Products Company strip mined local coal into the mid-century, but in their case, coal was a byproduct. Their primary source of clay was the 8 to 12 foot (2.5 to 4 meter) underclay found immediately below the coal. What Cheer Clay Products was organized in 1911. The plant cost $300,000 to build, and was seriously damaged by a fire in 1917. Despite this, by 1920, the company was expanding, purchasing a new Dragline excavator in order to work their clay pit.

== Geography ==
The central business district and the larger part of the town is located on the north-east bank of Coal Creek, a tributary of the North fork of the Skunk River. According to the United States Census Bureau, the city has a total area of 1.24 square miles (3.21 km^{2}), of which, 1.22 square miles (3.16 km^{2}) is land and 0.02 square miles (0.05 km^{2}) is water.

== Transportation ==
Iowa Highway 21 runs north–south through What Cheer. The city's northwestern outskirts border G29 Road.

== Demographics ==
Historical populations
Year	Pop.	±%
1880	719	—
1890	3,246	+351.5%
1900	2,746	−15.4%
1910	1,720	−37.4%
1920	1,626	−5.5%
1930	1,310	−19.4%
1940	1,339	+2.2%
1950	1,119	−16.4%
1960	956	−14.6%
1970	868	−9.2%
1980	803	−7.5%
1990	762	−5.1%
2000	678	−11.0%
2010	646	−4.7%
2020	607	−6.0%
Iowa Data Center; Source: U.S. Decennial Census

=== 2020 census ===
As of the census of 2020, there were 607 people, 264 households, and 132 families residing in the city. The population density was 490.6 inhabitants per square mile (189.4/km^{2}). There were 306 housing units at an average density of 247.3 per square mile (95.5/km^{2}). The racial makeup of the city was 94.2% White, 0.0% Black or African American, 0.7% Native American, 1.0% Asian, 0.0% Pacific Islander, 0.3% from other races and 3.8% from two or more races. Hispanic or Latino persons of any race comprised 1.3% of the population.

Of the 264 households, 24.6% of which had children under the age of 18 living with them, 34.5% were married couples living together, 9.8% were cohabitating couples, 29.2% had a female householder with no spouse or partner present and 26.5% had a male householder with no spouse or partner present. 50.0% of all households were non-families. 42.8% of all households were made up of individuals, 21.2% had someone living alone who was 65 years old or older.

The median age in the city was 43.0 years. 26.9% of the residents were under the age of 20; 5.3% were between the ages of 20 and 24; 21.1% were from 25 and 44; 27.2% were from 45 and 64; and 19.6% were 65 years of age or older. The gender makeup of the city was 51.9% male and 48.1% female.

=== 2010 census ===
As of the census of 2010, there were 646 people, 293 households, and 164 families residing in the city. The population density was 529.5 inhabitants per square mile (204.4/km^{2}). There were 347 housing units at an average density of 284.4 per square mile (109.8/km^{2}). The racial makeup of the city was 98.6% White, 0.2% Native American, 0.2% Asian, 0.2% from other races, and 0.9% from two or more races. Hispanic or Latino of any race were 0.2% of the population.

There were 293 households, of which 23.9% had children under the age of 18 living with them, 40.6% were married couples living together, 11.3% had a female householder with no husband present, 4.1% had a male householder with no wife present, and 44.0% were non-families. 38.9% of all households were made up of individuals, and 17.4% had someone living alone who was 65 years of age or older. The average household size was 2.20 and the average family size was 2.95.

The median age in the city was 45.3 years. 23.2% of residents were under the age of 18; 7% were between the ages of 18 and 24; 19.5% were from 25 to 44; 28% were from 45 to 64; and 22.3% were 65 years of age or older. The gender makeup of the city was 47.8% male and 52.2% female.

=== 2000 census ===
As of the census of 2000, there were 678 people, 307 households, and 182 families residing in the city. The population density was 559.4 inhabitants per square mile (216.0/km^{2}). There were 345 housing units at an average density of 284.7 per square mile (109.9/km^{2}). The racial makeup of the city was 98.38% White, 0.29% Native American, 0.15% from other races, and 1.18% from two or more races. Hispanic or Latino of any race were 0.44% of the population.

There were 307 households, out of which 22.8% had children under the age of 18 living with them, 46.9% were married couples living together, 9.4% had a female householder with no husband present, and 40.7% were non-families. 36.2% of all households were made up of individuals, and 20.2% had someone living alone who was 65 years of age or older. The average household size was 2.21 and the average family size was 2.90.

In the city, the population was spread out, with 22.7% under the age of 18, 8.0% from 18 to 24, 21.8% from 25 to 44, 24.0% from 45 to 64, and 23.5% who were 65 years of age or older. The median age was 43 years. For every 100 females, there were 89.4 males. For every 100 females age 18 and over, there were 86.5 males.

The median income for a household in the city was $27,292, and the median income for a family was $36,500. Males had a median income of $30,859 versus $22,917 for females. The per capita income for the city was $16,613. About 8.6% of families and 11.2% of the population were below the poverty line, including 9.8% of those under age 18 and 11.9% of those age 65 or over.

== Education ==
The Tri-County Community School District operates local area public schools.

== Notable people ==
- Betty De Boef, Iowa State Representative and resident
- Frank Hayes, president of the United Mine Workers, 1917–1920, born in What Cheer in 1882
- B. J. Palmer, the developer of chiropractic was born in What Cheer in 1882.
- Ed Thomas, raised in What Cheer, was NFL high school football coach of the year in 2005.

== In fiction ==
What Cheer is the hometown of the title character in Marguerite Young's enormous novel Miss MacIntosh, My Darling (1965). In a 1993 interview, Young claimed to have been unaware that What Cheer was genuine.

What Cheer is also the setting in the novel, "The Home For Wayward Clocks," written by Kathie Giorgio, published by The Main Street Rag Publishing Company in 2011. ISBN 978-1-59948-255-2
