= South English, Iowa =

- City
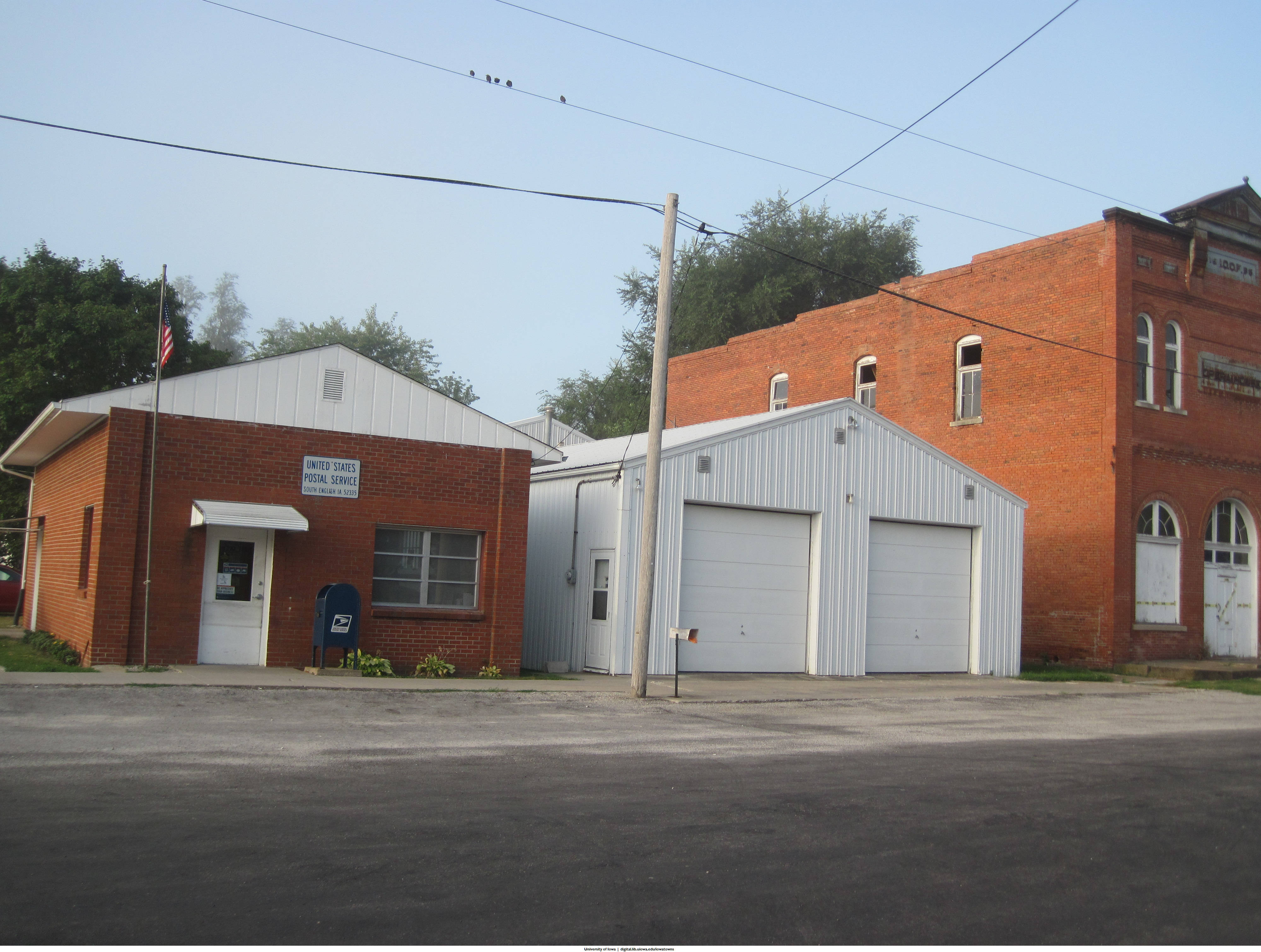
- The Post Office (and Odd Fellows Hall) in South English as they appeared in August of 2013.

- Location of South English, Iowa
- Coordinates: 41°27′08″N 92°05′25″W
- Country: United States
- State: Iowa
- County: Keokuk

Area
  - Total: 0.31 sq mi (0.81 km^{2})
  - Land: 0.31 sq mi (0.81 km^{2})
  - Water: 0 sq mi (0.00 km^{2})
- Elevation: 843 ft (257 m)

Population (2020)
  - Total: 202
  - Density: 643.2/sq mi (248.33/km^{2})
- Time zone: UTC-6 (Central (CST))
  - Summer (DST): UTC-5 (CDT)
- ZIP code: 52335
- Area code: 319
- FIPS code: 19-74055
- GNIS feature ID: 2395914

South English is a city in Keokuk County, Iowa, United States. The population was 202 at the time of the 2020 census. It is named for the English River.

== History ==
South English was incorporated in 1892 and named after the English River. In 1863 an incident occurred near the community when a pro-southern minister was shot by supporters of the Union. This incident has since become known as Tally's War or the Skunk River War.

== Geography ==
According to the United States Census Bureau, the city has a total area of 0.30 square miles (0.78 km^{2}), all of it land.

== Demographics ==
Historical populations
Year	Pop.	±%
1880	360	—
1900	319	−11.4%
1910	338	+6.0%
1920	355	+5.0%
1930	296	−16.6%
1940	288	−2.7%
1950	248	−13.9%
1960	217	−12.5%
1970	218	+0.5%
1980	211	−3.2%
1990	224	+6.2%
2000	213	−4.9%
2010	212	−0.5%
2020	202	−4.7%
Source:"U.S. Census website". United States Census Bureau. and Iowa Data Center; Source: U.S. Decennial Census

=== 2020 census ===
As of the census of 2020, there were 202 people, 82 households, and 60 families residing in the city. The population density was 643.2 inhabitants per square mile (248.3/km^{2}). There were 103 housing units at an average density of 328.0 per square mile (126.6/km^{2}). The racial makeup of the city was 91.1% White, 2.5% Black or African American, 0.0% Native American, 0.0% Asian, 0.0% Pacific Islander, 1.5% from other races and 5.0% from two or more races. Hispanic or Latino persons of any race comprised 5.9% of the population.

Of the 82 households, 30.5% of which had children under the age of 18 living with them, 46.3% were married couples living together, 18.3% were cohabitating couples, 15.9% had a female householder with no spouse or partner present and 19.5% had a male householder with no spouse or partner present. 26.8% of all households were non-families. 24.4% of all households were made up of individuals, 8.5% had someone living alone who was 65 years old or older.

The median age in the city was 40.3 years. 24.8% of the residents were under the age of 20; 4.0% were between the ages of 20 and 24; 26.2% were from 25 and 44; 29.7% were from 45 and 64; and 15.3% were 65 years of age or older. The gender makeup of the city was 54.0% male and 46.0% female.

=== 2010 census ===
As of the census of 2010, there were 212 people, 88 households, and 58 families living in the city. The population density was 706.7 inhabitants per square mile (272.9/km^{2}). There were 101 housing units at an average density of 336.7 per square mile (130.0/km^{2}). The racial makeup of the city was 99.1% White and 0.9% from two or more races. Hispanic or Latino of any race were 1.9% of the population.

There were 88 households, of which 30.7% had children under the age of 18 living with them, 47.7% were married couples living together, 10.2% had a female householder with no husband present, 8.0% had a male householder with no wife present, and 34.1% were non-families. 29.5% of all households were made up of individuals, and 12.5% had someone living alone who was 65 years of age or older. The average household size was 2.41 and the average family size was 2.98.

The median age in the city was 37.3 years. 29.2% of residents were under the age of 18; 3.3% were between the ages of 18 and 24; 26% were from 25 to 44; 29.7% were from 45 to 64; and 11.8% were 65 years of age or older. The gender makeup of the city was 53.8% male and 46.2% female.

=== 2000 census ===
As of the census of 2000, there were 213 people, 96 households, and 60 families living in the city. The population density was 695.2 inhabitants per square mile (268.4/km^{2}). There were 109 housing units at an average density of 355.8 per square mile (137.4/km^{2}). The racial makeup of the city was 99.06% White, 0.47% from other races, and 0.47% from two or more races. Hispanic or Latino of any race were 0.94% of the population.

There were 96 households, out of which 21.9% had children under the age of 18 living with them, 54.2% were married couples living together, 6.3% had a female householder with no husband present, and 36.5% were non-families. 34.4% of all households were made up of individuals, and 17.7% had someone living alone who was 65 years of age or older. The average household size was 2.22 and the average family size was 2.84.

Age spread: 23.9% under the age of 18, 4.7% from 18 to 24, 28.6% from 25 to 44, 24.9% from 45 to 64, and 17.8% who were 65 years of age or older. The median age was 42 years. For every 100 females, there were 97.2 males. For every 100 females age 18 and over, there were 84.1 males.

The median income for a household in the city was $36,429, and the median income for a family was $51,071. Males had a median income of $30,750 versus $30,192 for females. The per capita income for the city was $21,833. About 3.1% of families and 6.7% of the population were below the poverty line, including 14.6% of those under the age of eighteen and 15.4% of those 65 or over.

== Education ==
It is within the English Valleys Community School District.

== See also ==
- Tally's War
