= Pekin, Iowa =

- Unincorporated community
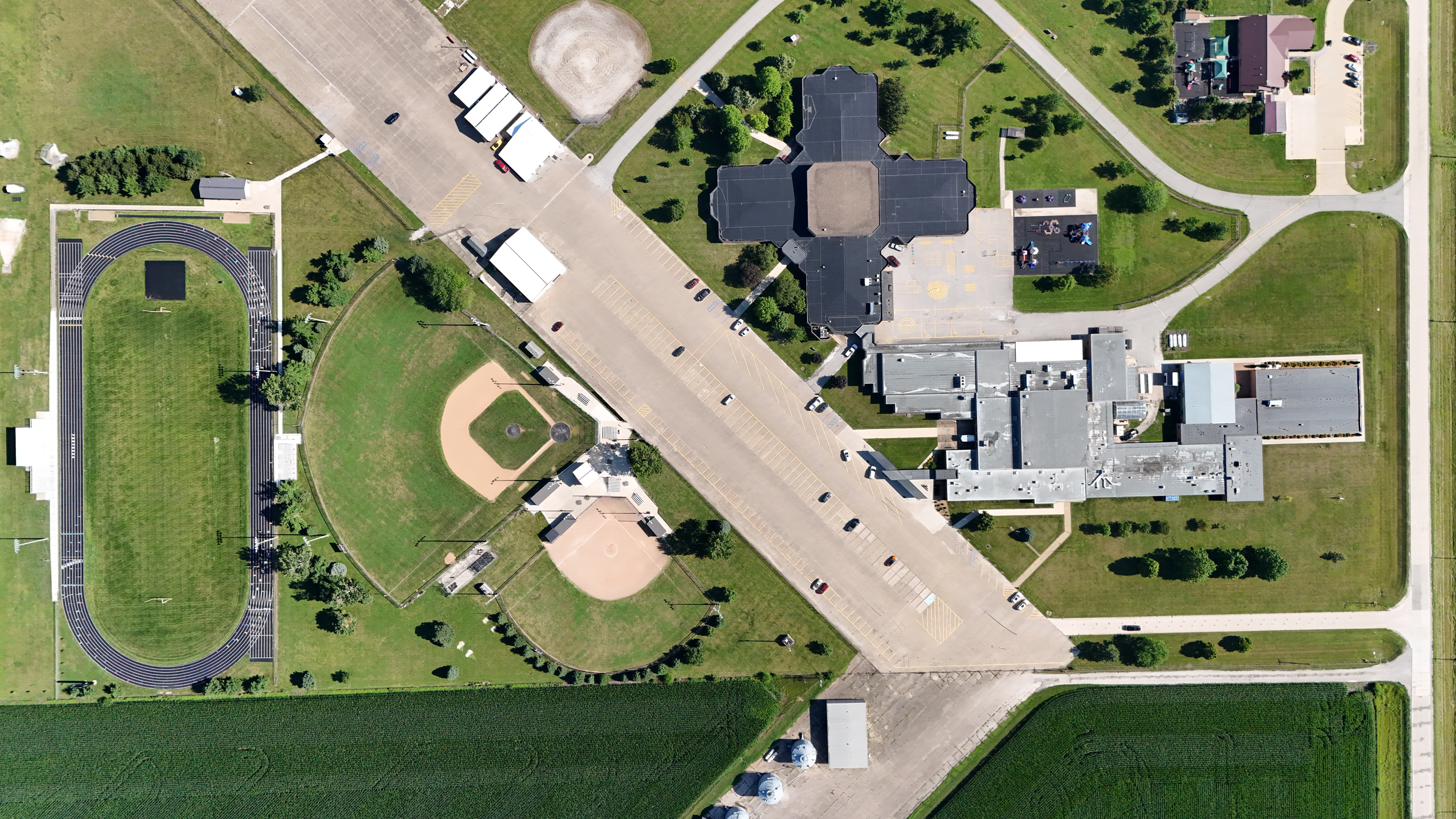
- The school complex in Pekin

- Location within Iowa Location within the United States
- Coordinates: 41°09′46″N 92°09′35″W
- Country: United States
- State: Iowa
- County: Jefferson
- Elevation: 814 ft (248 m)
- Time zone: UTC-6 (Central (CST))
  - Summer (DST): UTC-5 (CDT)
- Area code: 641
- GNIS feature ID: 460061

Pekin is a small unincorporated community in northwestern Jefferson County, Iowa, United States.

== History ==
The Burlington and Western Railway arrived in Pekin in late 1882. This was a narrow gauge line, widened to standard gauge in 1902 and taken over by the Chicago, Burlington and Quincy, and then sold to the Minneapolis and St. Louis in 1934. Pekin's population was 32 in 1902.

In 1909, Pekin was just one city block with a church and 14 vacant lots, a vacant block north of the Depot and passing siding. The lack of development may be due to the fact that Pekin was not much more than a mile (2 km) northwest of Linby, a village founded in 1902 at the point where a new Chicago, Milwaukee and St. Paul line crossed the Burlington and Western.

Pekin's population in 1925 was 109. The population was 75 in 1940.

== Education ==
Pekin is the location of a regional school system, Pekin Community School District, which draws students from Hedrick, Martinsburg, Ollie, Packwood, Richland, and Farson, as well as from the surrounding countryside.

The school is built upon the former Linby Naval Outlying Landing Field (OLF # 07815 / Auxiliary Field #6 (Ottumwa)), built in 1943 for training purposes. This airfield was one of 15 satellite airfields used during WW2 by Naval Air Station Ottumwa, which conducted primary flight training from 1942 to 1947. There are four concrete runways in a diamond shape, each about 200' wide by 2000' long. Prevailing winds made take-off and landing difficult so it was little used. It was closed at some point between 1948 and 1955. Sale of the airport to the regional school system was contingent on the runways being retained in case the government ever needed them again. The high school was built on one of the runways and the first classes were in 1961. Today, some of the runways are used for school parking and maintenance equipment, and is also used for training practice for surrounding police departments.

The school teaches math, science, English, and other subjects common in public schools. For eighteen years, only the high school students went to the regional school, which is located a mile south of Pekin, but in 1978, all grades, K-12, began to study at the regional school, with local buildings being permanently closed.
