= Gayno Smith =

American mass murderer

Gayno Gilbert Smith
- Smith c. 1962
- Born: January 23, 1938; Keokuk County, Iowa, U.S.
- Died: May 16, 2005 (aged 67); Iowa City, Iowa, U.S.
- Status: Deceased
- Convictions: First degree murder (5 counts); Second degree murder
- Penalty: Life imprisonment

Details
- Victims: 6
- Span of crimes: October 1961 – May 27, 1962
- Country: United States
- State: Iowa
- Weapon: Savage Model 24 (.22/.410)
- Date apprehended: June 1, 1962
- Imprisoned at: Iowa State Penitentiary

Gayno Gilbert Smith (January 23, 1938 – May 16, 2005) was an American mass murderer and serial killer who killed six of his family members in Iowa between 1961 and 1962.

Before the murders, Smith had been living in Denver, but due to problems there had come to Martinsburg, Iowa to live with his stepmother. When he had problems with her as well, he moved to the home of his uncle Andrew.

== Murders ==
On May 27, 1962, Smith murdered Andrew McBeth, 51, and Dora McBeth, 41, and their three children: Amos and Anna McBeth, 19, and Donna Jean Kellogg, 17. Smith, then 24, a nephew of the elder McBeths', confessed to the crime. He also confessed to having murdered his stepmother, Juanita Smith, who had been missing for several months, in 1961.

The McBeth family lived in rural Iowa, about four miles north of Martinsburg, and Gayno Smith had been living with them at the time. Another daughter, Patsy Lou, 15, was wounded by Smith but escaped in the night and ran to a nearby farm for help. Kellogg's six-month-old baby, Perry, was in a crib and left unharmed.

On the night of the murders, the McBeth children – Amos, Anna, and Donna Jean – had driven to Brighton, Iowa for a dance and Donna Jean, as was her custom, had left her infant in the care of her parents. "Smith remained at the dance a short time, then disappeared until midnight, according to court records. He came back to pick up the group after the dance ended. Thunder, lightning and heavy rain began as the five went to a truck stop for food. When they returned to their farmhouse, the lights were out."

The children found flashlights and made their way around the house to investigate. Donna and Amos found the murdered bodies of their parents in the garage, where they'd been dragged. They tried to call for help but discovered the lines had been cut.

"Suddenly, Smith appeared before them with a flashlight and a gun. He shot Amos in the face, then Donna. He shot Patsy in the shoulder. Though badly wounded, Amos pleaded for his life but was shot again. Patsy escaped to another room where she found her older sister, Anna, already dead.

"Smith chased her to a ditch in the countryside. She played cat and mouse through the ditches, crawling and crouching to escape his roving flashlight through the early morning hours. She finally reached a nearby farmhouse, where she called her uncle, Firman McBeth."

Smith went into hiding but was found four days later in a barn near Lake Wapello. After being arrested, he confessed both to the McBeth murders in Martinsburg and also to the murder of his stepmother, Juanita Marcella Smith, the previous October in Hedrick, Iowa. At the time, Iowa still had capital punishment, and prosecutors wanted Smith to be hanged. Facing an almost certain death sentence if the case went to trial, Smith pleaded guilty to one count of second degree murder and five counts of first degree murder, leaving his fate up to the judge.

Arguing for a death sentence, prosecutors said Smith had "attempted to exterminate an entire family." A psychiatric evaluation of Smith concluded that he was sane. His lawyers did not call any witnesses and did not contest that Smith was sane and the crimes were premeditated, choosing instead to plead with Judge C. R. Carson for mercy. Ultimately, Carson spared his life. After finding him guilty of five counts of first degree murder and one count of second degree murder, he instead sentenced Smith to six life terms at hard labor. The sentences were ordered to run consecutively to ensure that he would spend the rest of his natural life in prison.

Infant Perry was adopted by his uncle Firman, Andrew McBeth's brother, and raised with Firman's own nine biological children.

Perry, the child in the crib, has spoken about the problems he faced growing up. "All the way through school I was a bully because I wanted people to hurt as bad as I did. I hated everything and everybody," he said. "I'm sorry about that now. When I see those people today, I try to tell them that, but they just don't understand."

Perry graduated from Pekin Community High School.

In 1971, Smith filed an unsuccessful motion for a new trial. He was interviewed in prison in 1974 by The Waterloo-Cedar Falls Courier. Smith had accepted the fact that he would die in prison. He said he was excited to get an education in prison. He started off by working through a lengthy series. At the time of the article, Smith was more than halfway to a college degree. "I had 68 quarter hours in commercial cooking and I've completed 66 quarter hours in academic courses so far," he said. He performed well in both subjects, having a 3.75 GPA in the cooking program and a 3.3 GPA in academics. Smith said he hoped to work with juvenile delinquents and help other young people with his newfound knowledge.

Smith also spoke about making changes to the prison system. "I'd like to go to Des Moines and speak to the legislature," he said. "I'd like to talk to them about this institution itself, about some of their laws, and some of their rehabilitation programs. All prison systems are inhumane. You take a man from society who 'fails' when he's in an abnormal situation and put him in one of these places. It's an abnormal situation here in itself, then you say to the man, 'rehabilitate yourself'. YOU DON'T send a person on the street to a mental hospital and say, 'make yourself well'. There's nothing in here to change you. You can let prison society destroy you or you can get some education and change yourself."

Gayno Smith died from heart problems on May 16, 2005. He had been transferred to a hospital shortly before his death. Smith's body was cremated and buried in Mount Zion Cemetery next to the plot of his mother. After hearing of Smith's death, Perry said he wished he'd been hanged. "I'm glad he's dead," he said. "It was the best day of my life. I hope he burns in hell forever."

== See also ==
- List of serial killers in the United States
