= Richland, Iowa =

- City
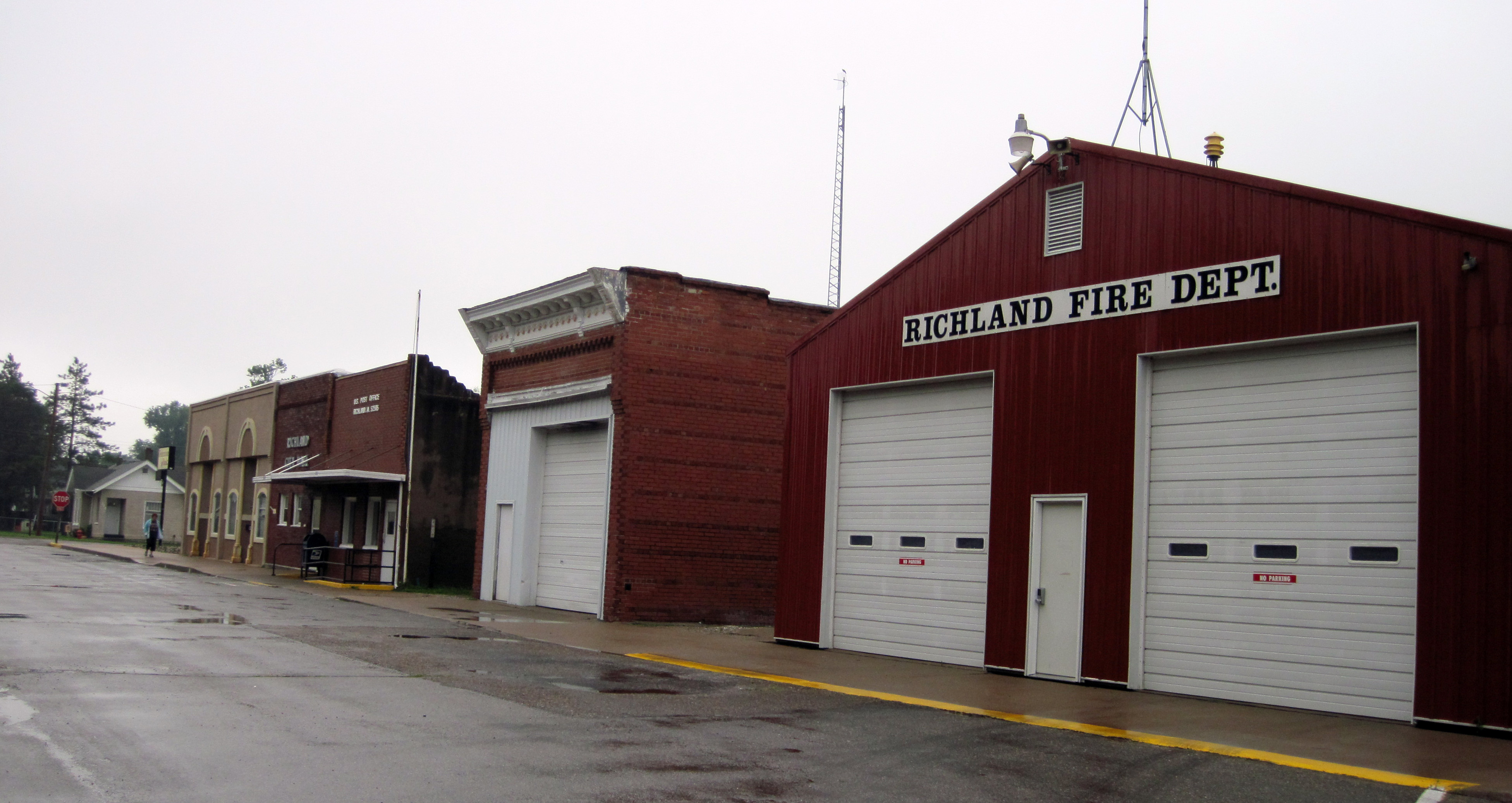
- Richland Fire Department in Downtown Richland

- Location of Richland, Iowa
- Coordinates: 41°11′08″N 91°59′38″W
- Country: United States
- State: Iowa
- County: Keokuk

Area
  - Total: 1.03 sq mi (2.68 km^{2})
  - Land: 1.03 sq mi (2.68 km^{2})
  - Water: 0 sq mi (0.00 km^{2})
- Elevation: 778 ft (237 m)

Population (2020)
  - Total: 542
  - Density: 524.0/sq mi (202.33/km^{2})
- Time zone: UTC-6 (Central (CST))
  - Summer (DST): UTC-5 (CDT)
- ZIP code: 52585
- Area code: 319
- FIPS code: 19-66720
- GNIS feature ID: 2396364
- Website: cityofrichlandia.org

Richland is a city in Keokuk County, Iowa, United States. The population was 542 at the time of the 2020 census.

== Geography ==
According to the United States Census Bureau, the city has a total area of 0.77 square miles (1.99 km^{2}), all of it land.

== Demographics ==
Historical populations
Year	Pop.	±%
1880	254	—
1890	531	+109.1%
1900	534	+0.6%
1910	613	+14.8%
1920	639	+4.2%
1930	713	+11.6%
1940	614	−13.9%
1950	591	−3.7%
1960	546	−7.6%
1970	595	+9.0%
1980	600	+0.8%
1990	522	−13.0%
2000	587	+12.5%
2010	584	−0.5%
2020	542	−7.2%
Source:"U.S. Census website". United States Census Bureau. and Iowa Data Center; Source: U.S. Decennial Census

=== 2020 census ===
As of the census of 2020, there were 542 people, 235 households, and 152 families residing in the city. The population density was 524.0 inhabitants per square mile (202.3/km^{2}). There were 253 housing units at an average density of 244.6 per square mile (94.4/km^{2}). The racial makeup of the city was 93.0% White, 0.4% Black or African American, 0.0% Native American, 0.0% Asian, 0.0% Pacific Islander, 0.7% from other races and 5.9% from two or more races. Hispanic or Latino persons of any race comprised 2.6% of the population.

Of the 235 households, 32.3% of which had children under the age of 18 living with them, 47.2% were married couples living together, 10.6% were cohabitating couples, 22.6% had a female householder with no spouse or partner present and 19.6% had a male householder with no spouse or partner present. 35.3% of all households were non-families. 28.9% of all households were made up of individuals, 14.5% had someone living alone who was 65 years old or older.

The median age in the city was 40.6 years. 27.5% of the residents were under the age of 20; 4.4% were between the ages of 20 and 24; 23.1% were from 25 and 44; 24.9% were from 45 and 64; and 20.1% were 65 years of age or older. The gender makeup of the city was 50.2% male and 49.8% female.

=== 2010 census ===
As of the census of 2010, there were 584 people, 239 households, and 161 families living in the city. The population density was 758.4 inhabitants per square mile (292.8/km^{2}). There were 262 housing units at an average density of 340.3 per square mile (131.4/km^{2}). The racial makeup of the city was 98.5% White, 0.3% African American, 0.7% Native American, and 0.5% from two or more races. Hispanic or Latino of any race were 0.3% of the population.

There were 239 households, of which 31.4% had children under the age of 18 living with them, 54.4% were married couples living together, 10.9% had a female householder with no husband present, 2.1% had a male householder with no wife present, and 32.6% were non-families. 28.5% of all households were made up of individuals, and 15.1% had someone living alone who was 65 years of age or older. The average household size was 2.44 and the average family size was 3.01.

The median age in the city was 38.6 years. 27.2% of residents were under the age of 18; 6% were between the ages of 18 and 24; 25.6% were from 25 to 44; 22.7% were from 45 to 64; and 18.5% were 65 years of age or older. The gender makeup of the city was 49.1% male and 50.9% female.

=== 2000 census ===
As of the census of 2000, there were 587 people, 251 households, and 164 families living in the city. The population density was 761.6 inhabitants per square mile (294.1/km^{2}). There were 269 housing units at an average density of 349.0 per square mile (134.7/km^{2}). The racial makeup of the city was 98.98% White, and 1.02% from two or more races. Hispanic or Latino of any race were 1.02% of the population.

There were 251 households, out of which 32.3% had children under the age of 18 living with them, 53.0% were married couples living together, 10.0% had a female householder with no husband present, and 34.3% were non-families. 32.3% of all households were made up of individuals, and 16.3% had someone living alone who was 65 years of age or older. The average household size was 2.34 and the average family size was 2.92.

In the city, the population was spread out, with 26.1% under the age of 18, 6.3% from 18 to 24, 26.6% from 25 to 44, 22.3% from 45 to 64, and 18.7% who were 65 years of age or older. The median age was 39 years. For every 100 females, there were 90.6 males. For every 100 females age 18 and over, there were 88.7 males.

The median income for a household in the city was $32,813, and the median income for a family was $46,806. Males had a median income of $31,442 versus $20,521 for females. The per capita income for the city was $14,726. About 11.9% of families and 16.8% of the population were below the poverty line, including 22.1% of those under age 18 and 13.4% of those age 65 or over.

== Education ==
It is in the Pekin Community School District. Pekin Community High School is the local high school.

Richland had its own elementary and secondary school, which was constructed in the 1920s. In 1959, after much local controversy, Richland was incorporated into the Pekin Community School System. The high schools in Richland, Ollie, Packwood, and Farson were closed, although the buildings associated with them continued to be used for elementary and junior high school students. All the high school students from these four towns, along with all the rural areas which had been associated with these separate school systems, were then educated at a new building located near Pekin.

In 1970, a further consolidation eliminated the local junior high schools and replaced them with a consolidated middle school in Packwood: all students in grades six through eight began to go to Packwood, and, thereafter, the Richland school building was used only for elementary students (kindergarten through fifth grade) from Richland and its associated rural areas, including Rubio. Elementary students from elsewhere in the district went to Ollie, and the Farson school was closed. In this consolidation, all middle school students went to Packwood.

In 1978, after completion of a new structure adjacent to the Pekin High School building, all students in the district began to go to classes there. The Packwood and Richland school buildings were then closed. Richland's building was torn down on March 17, 2021.

== Notable people ==
- Paul McCracken (1915–2012 ) Chairman of the Council of Economic Advisors from 1969 to 1971 under President Richard Nixon.
