= Farson =

Farson may refer to:

== People with the surname ==
- Daniel Farson (1927–1997), British writer and broadcaster
- George Farson (1939–2010), American professional baseball player and manager
- John Farson, fictional character from Stephen King's The Dark Tower series of novels
- Negley Farson (1890–1960), American author and adventurer
- Richard Farson Ph.D. (1926–2017), psychologist, author, and educator

== Places ==
- Farson, Iowa, unincorporated community in Competine Township in northeastern Wapello County, Iowa, United States
- Farson, Wyoming, census-designated place (CDP) in Sweetwater County, Wyoming, United States
