= Ollie, Iowa =

- City
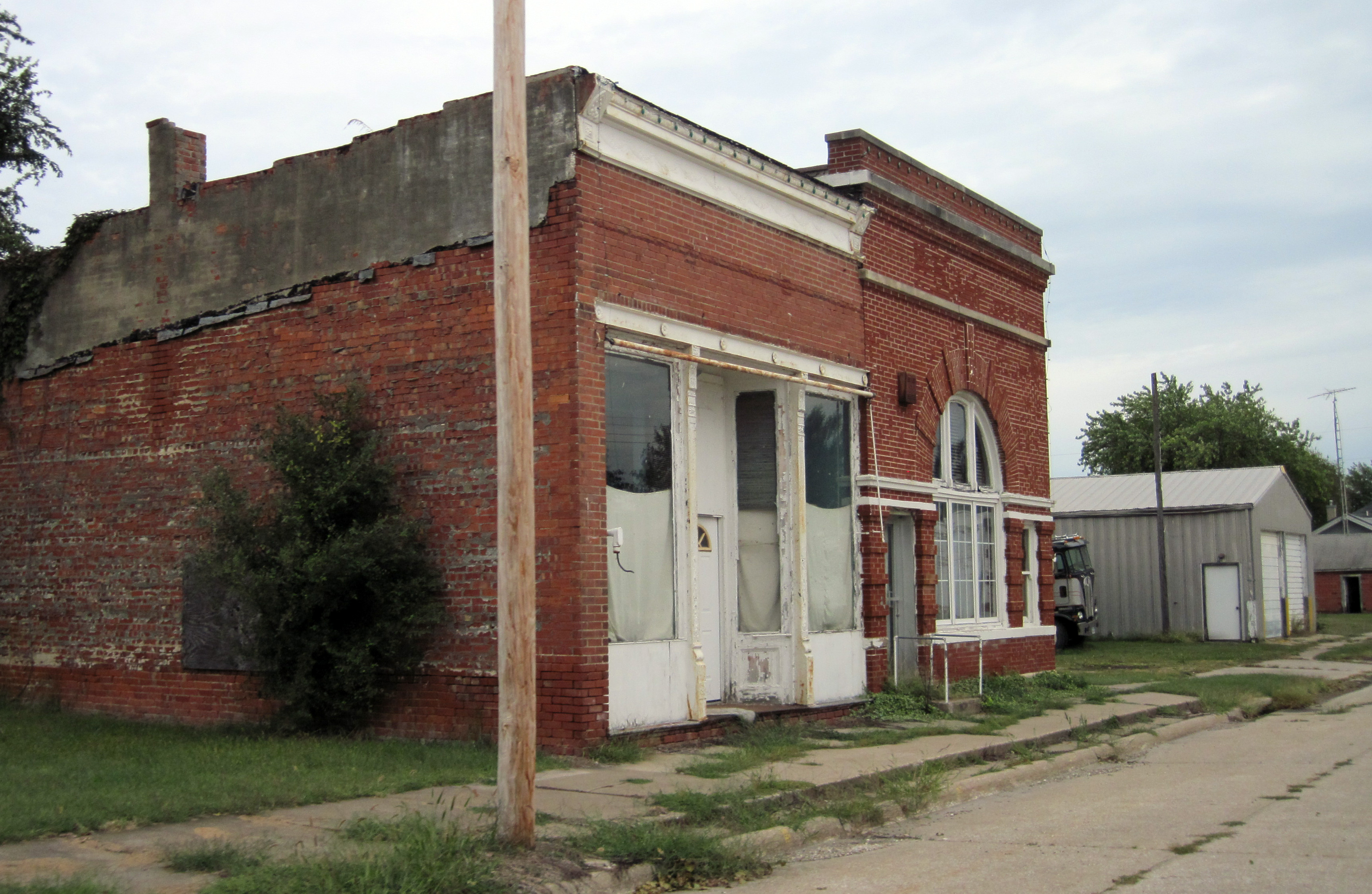
- Main Street in Ollie in 2010

- Location of Ollie, Iowa
- Coordinates: 41°11′57″N 92°05′32″W
- Country: United States
- State: Iowa
- County: Keokuk

Area
  - Total: 1.00 sq mi (2.58 km^{2})
  - Land: 1.00 sq mi (2.58 km^{2})
  - Water: 0 sq mi (0.00 km^{2})
- Elevation: 781 ft (238 m)

Population (2020)
  - Total: 201
  - Density: 202.1/sq mi (78.05/km^{2})
- Time zone: UTC-6 (Central (CST))
  - Summer (DST): UTC-5 (CDT)
- ZIP code: 52576
- Area code: 641
- FIPS code: 19-59070
- GNIS feature ID: 2396058

Ollie is a city in Keokuk County, Iowa, United States. The population was 201 at the time of the 2020 census. Originally known as Hemingford, the town voted to change the name to Ollie in 1892.

== Geography ==
According to the United States Census Bureau, the city has a total area of 0.99 square miles (2.56 km^{2}), all of it land.

== Demographics ==
Historical populations
Year	Pop.	±%
1900	238	—
1910	289	+21.4%
1920	385	+33.2%
1930	294	−23.6%
1940	294	+0.0%
1950	298	+1.4%
1960	291	−2.3%
1970	268	−7.9%
1980	232	−13.4%
1990	207	−10.8%
2000	224	+8.2%
2010	215	−4.0%
2020	201	−6.5%
Source:"U.S. Census website". United States Census Bureau. and Iowa Data Center; Source: U.S. Decennial Census

=== 2020 census ===
As of the census of 2020, there were 201 people, 85 households, and 53 families residing in the city. The population density was 202.2 inhabitants per square mile (78.1/km^{2}). There were 101 housing units at an average density of 101.6 per square mile (39.2/km^{2}). The racial makeup of the city was 95.0% White, 2.0% Black or African American, 0.0% Native American, 0.0% Asian, 0.0% Pacific Islander, 0.0% from other races and 3.0% from two or more races. Hispanic or Latino persons of any race comprised 1.5% of the population.

Of the 85 households, 32.9% of which had children under the age of 18 living with them, 42.4% were married couples living together, 11.8% were cohabitating couples, 17.6% had a female householder with no spouse or partner present and 28.2% had a male householder with no spouse or partner present. 37.6% of all households were non-families. 34.1% of all households were made up of individuals, 18.8% had someone living alone who was 65 years old or older.

The median age in the city was 33.3 years. 29.4% of the residents were under the age of 20; 4.5% were between the ages of 20 and 24; 23.9% were from 25 and 44; 21.9% were from 45 and 64; and 20.4% were 65 years of age or older. The gender makeup of the city was 54.2% male and 45.8% female.

=== 2010 census ===
As of the census of 2010, there were 215 people, 97 households, and 58 families living in the city. The population density was 217.2 inhabitants per square mile (83.9/km^{2}). There were 108 housing units at an average density of 109.1 per square mile (42.1/km^{2}). The racial makeup of the city was 99.1% White, 0.5% Asian, and 0.5% from two or more races.

There were 97 households, of which 22.7% had children under the age of 18 living with them, 51.5% were married couples living together, 6.2% had a female householder with no husband present, 2.1% had a male householder with no wife present, and 40.2% were non-families. 33.0% of all households were made up of individuals, and 12.4% had someone living alone who was 65 years of age or older. The average household size was 2.22 and the average family size was 2.74.

The median age in the city was 46.1 years. 18.6% of residents were under the age of 18; 7.5% were between the ages of 18 and 24; 21.9% were from 25 to 44; 27.4% were from 45 to 64; and 24.7% were 65 years of age or older. The gender makeup of the city was 47.4% male and 52.6% female.

=== 2000 census ===
As of the census of 2000, there were 224 people, 101 households, and 65 families living in the city. The population density was 224.2 inhabitants per square mile (86.6/km^{2}). There were 112 housing units at an average density of 112.1 per square mile (43.3/km^{2}). The racial makeup of the city was 98.66% White, 0.45% Asian, and 0.89% from two or more races.

There were 101 households, out of which 28.7% had children under the age of 18 living with them, 58.4% were married couples living together, 5.0% had a female householder with no husband present, and 34.7% were non-families. 32.7% of all households were made up of individuals, and 20.8% had someone living alone who was 65 years of age or older. The average household size was 2.22 and the average family size was 2.83.

In the city, the population was spread out, with 20.5% under the age of 18, 7.6% from 18 to 24, 23.7% from 25 to 44, 18.8% from 45 to 64, and 29.5% who were 65 years of age or older. The median age was 43 years. For every 100 females, there were 101.8 males. For every 100 females age 18 and over, there were 95.6 males.

The median income for a household in the city was $30,000, and the median income for a family was $35,938. Males had a median income of $27,188 versus $20,313 for females. The per capita income for the city was $15,100. About 1.8% of families and 7.3% of the population were below the poverty line, including none of those under the age of eighteen and 17.3% of those 65 or over.

== Notable people ==
- Polly Rosenbaum (1899–2003), Member of the Arizona House of Representatives
- Keaton Winn (born 1998), pitcher for the San Francisco Giants

== Education ==
It is in the Pekin Community School District. Pekin Community High School is the local high school.

Ollie High School graduated its final class in 1959. In the fall of that year, the hitherto independent school systems of Ollie, Richland, Packwood and Farson, along with the associated rural areas, were consolidated, and all secondary students began to go to the Pekin Community High School. The Ollie school building remained open and was used for grades K-8. In the early 1970s, the Farson building was closed and Ollie was used for the K-5 students from Ollie, Packwood and Farson, while Richland's K-5 students remained in that town. All students 6-8 then went to the Packwood building. Finally, in 1978, all the local schools were closed and grades K-8 were educated in a new school building adjacent to the Pekin High School.
