= Hedrick Community School District =

Former school district in Iowa

The Hedrick Community School District was a school district serving Hedrick, Iowa.

The town had a school for around 100 years. The school experienced a population decline as Hedrick's economy faltered; in its final year it had about 200 students and 40 employees. The leadership of the school district stated that the small population meant it could not offer a full range of courses.

== History ==
Circa 1960 there was a proposal to merge the Hedrick district with the Pekin Community School District. In 1986 there was another proposal to merge the Hedrick district and the Pekin District, causing turmoil in the community.

By 1990 Iowa law allowed students to attend schools in other school districts, but at the time students had to pay tuition there. Hedrick sued the Pekin district over accepting students for free that should have been counted as out of district, as they lived with Pekin district-resident family members or friends of their family but not with their primary caregivers. A jury decided that the Hedrick district was damaged by this. The law was later modified so that a student can attend another school district for free.

=== Closure ===
The State of Iowa took control of the Hedrick district in 1990. The district was involuntarily dissolved by the State of Iowa on July 1, 1991, due to not meeting state requirements to be a certified school in that state. The school did not offer the number of courses deemed sufficient by Iowa authorities. Additionally several teachers did not have the proper teaching licenses. Barbara Vobejda of The Washington Post stated "Many of those involved agree that the problems were largely a result of declining population."

It was the first school district in Iowa to be closed involuntarily by the state government, and the City of Hedrick itself was facing an economic decline. Area residents disliked the move, and Hedrick CSD officials considered whether they could file lawsuits.

Students in the City of Hedrick were rezoned to the Pekin district. The State of Iowa decided to make the Pekin district receive the bulk of the territory after surveying Hedrick community members for their preferred receiving district. A draft of a state proposal to merge much of the Hedrick district into Pekin anticipated that Pekin would take in about 85% of the Hedrick students, and it was compulsory for the Pekin district to hire faculty formerly at the Hedrick district. The Iowa State Board of Education approved this proposal, with seven voting in favor and one against. Mayor of Hedrick Bill Mosbey stated that the connections between Pekin and Hedrick made the decision to send most district students to Hedrick suitable. While much of the Hedrick district's area was assigned to Pekin, because some area residents in western and southern portions of the Hedrick district wanted to go to other school districts, some sections of the Hedrick district were assigned to Fremont Community School District and Ottumwa Community School District.

The Hedrick School was demolished in fall 1991.

In 1991 Mosbey expressed a fear that the loss of the school would further accelerate the economic and social decline already in the town. Vobejda stated that some residents were afraid that the school closing would convince some businesses to leave town, and that "the school closing has dealt a blow to the town's sense of confidence and character."

== Student body ==
Circa 1960 there were 355 students. By 1986 this was down to around 200, and enrollment in 1991 was about the same as in 1986. Additionally, in 1991 there were about 32 students of the Pekin district who lived in the boundaries of the Hedrick district, and those two groups combined numbered around 234.

== Campus ==
The building had two full stories, plus a partial third story.

== Academic performance ==
In 1986 the test percentile results for the Iowa Tests of Educational Development (ITED) were as follows for grades 9, 10, 11, and 12: the lowest percentile, the second lowest, the seventh lowest, and the third lowest.

== Athletics ==
The basketball team was valued by the community, and its main rivalry was with the Pekin school district. The school district had an American football team until circa 1989. In the winter of 1990 the number of students would no longer support a basketball team with female students.

== See also ==
School districts forced by the Iowa Board of Education to merge

- Farragut Community School District
- Russell Community School District
