= Burlington and Northwestern Railway =

Railroad in Iowa, US

Overview
- Headquarters: Burlington, Iowa
- Locale: Iowa
- Dates of operation: 1876–1903
- Successor: Chicago, Burlington and Quincy Railroad

Technical
- Track gauge: 3 ft (914 mm)
- Length: 123.6 miles (198.9 km)

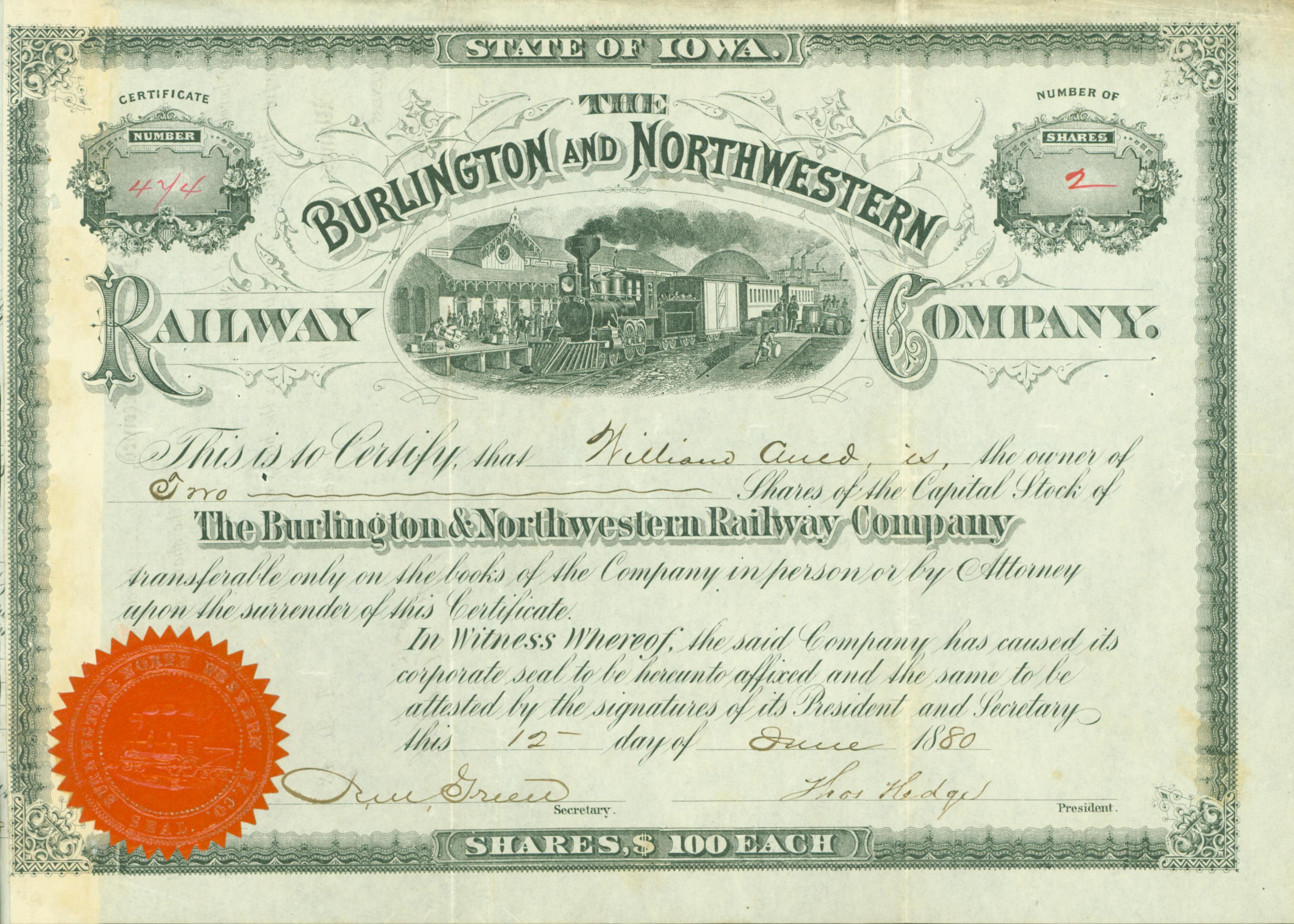
Share of the Burlington and Northwestern Railway Company, issued 12 June 1880

The Burlington and Northwestern Railway (B&NW) was a 3 ft (914 mm) narrow gauge railroad system in Iowa that operated during the late nineteenth and early twentieth centuries. It connected Burlington, Iowa with branches to Washington and Oskaloosa, Iowa. Incorporated in 1875 as the Burlington and Northwestern Narrow Gauge Railway Company, it began carrying traffic in 1876, when it also dropped 'narrow gauge' from its corporate name. The line reached Washington in 1880, operating over 52.5 miles (84.5 km) of track. In 1881, the Burlington and Western Railway Company, a subsidiary of the Chicago, Burlington and Quincy Railroad (CB&Q) was formed to connect the line to Oskaloosa, completed in 1883. For two decades, both lines were operated as a single system, until on June 20, 1902, the system was widened to standard gauge and the B&NW was adsorbed by the B&W. Later that year, the system was leased to the CB&Q, and in 1903, the entire system was deeded to the CB&Q.

The B&NW-B&W system was one of only two narrow-gauge lines in Iowa to survive into the 20th Century. Only the Bellevue and Cascade lasted longer.

== Route ==
=== Burlington and Northwestern ===
The Burlington and Northwestern owned 38.77 miles (62.39 km) of main-line track, in addition to operating rights over 14.13 miles (22.74 km) of Burlington, Cedar Rapids and Northern (BCR&N) track. The line was built with 30 pound rail, and it had 38 wooden trestles with an aggregate length of 2,790 feet (850 m). By 1892, the number of trestles had been reduced to 22 with an aggregate length of 2,096 feet (639 m). The longest trestle was 500 feet (150 m) long. One 80 foot (24 m) bridge was installed, but the remainder of the reduction in trestles must have been the result of adding fill.

The B&NW tracks ran north along Front Street in Burlington, Iowa, starting at the corner of Market and Front Streets, paralleling the BCR&N tracks to a yard, turntable and roundhouse just north of Burlington. The B&NW initially had a small storefront on Front Street, very near the south end of the line, but later used the BCR&N depot. This was a double storefront on the corner of Jefferson and Front Streets, directly across Front Street from the Diamond Jo Line offices and steamboat docks. Later, the B&NW tracks were apparently extended south into the Chicago, Burlington and Quincy yard to that line's freight house.

The B&NW used the BCR&N tracks for 14 miles (23 km) north of their Burlington yards. Since the latter was a standard-gauge line, 3-rail dual-gauge track was used. The line served the BCR&N stations at Sperry and Mediapolis along this stretch. The climb from the Mississippi River at Burlington up to Sperry involved a long 1.15 percent grade following Dry Branch Creek; this appears to have been the ruling grade for the entire system.

Just north of Mediapolis, the B&NW turned west on its own right-of-way, passing through Yarmouth, on the way to Winfield. The route continued through Crawfordsville before reaching Washington, where tracks entered town street running north on 2nd St. (renamed 6th Ave. by 1902). The line ended at a Wye just south of the Rock Island depot. The B&NW Washington depot was inside the south end of the wye.

=== Burlington and Western ===
The Burlington and Western main-line was 70.7 miles (113.8 km) long, in addition to operating rights over 33.8 miles (54.4 km) of Burlington and Northwestern and Burlington, Cedar Rapids and Northern track into Burlington. The line was built with 35 pound rail. It had 2 iron bridges with an aggregate length of 244 feet (74 m) and 51 wooden trestles with an aggregate length of 7,110 feet (2,170 m). By 1892, there were still just 2 iron bridges, one 120 feet (37 m) long, one 376 feet (115 m) long. The number of trestles had been reduced to 39 with an aggregate length of 7,158 feet (2,182 m); the longest single trestle was 640 feet (200 m).

The B&W line was constructed west from Winfield at the same time that the Iowa Central Railway was being built. The Iowa Central crossed the Burlington and Northwestern at Winfield, and the lines paralleled each other, crossing three times on the way to Oskaloosa. Battles for right-of-way between these two lines included confrontations where crews from both lines vandalized the work of their competitors.

The B&W route passed through Noble and Coppock on the way to Brighton, where it crossed the Iowa Central. Crooked Creek flows into the Skunk River just south of Coppock; both the B&W and the Iowa Central had to build substantial bridges over both of these to reach the village. The bridge over the Skunk River, between Coppock and Brighton, was the site of some of the most intense battles between the B&NW and Iowa Central. The two lines crossed again at Brighton.

From Brighton, the line passed through Packwood and Pekin; between these two, it crossed the Milwaukee Road. From Pekin, it continued through Martinsburg to Hedrik where it crossed another branch of the Milwaukee. There were crossings of the Iowa Central both east and west of Hedrick.

The line continued from Hedrick through Fremont and Cedar before entering Oskaloosa from the southeast. The Chicago and Northwestern branch to Muchakinock, Iowa, completed in 1884, crossed the line between Cedar and Oskaloosa. Initially, there was no station at this crossing, but in late 1886, citizens of the area petitioned for a station house, noting that as many as 30 passengers a day were transferring there, and a building was erected at the crossing. Timetables list the new station as Stark. The B&W crossed the Iowa Central again just inside the Oskaloosa city limits. The Oskaloosa depot was a block east of the Iowa Central depot. To get there, the B&W had to cross the Rock Island tracks twice.

== Traffic ==
Despite the fact that both ends of the Burlington and Northwestern were well served by standard-gauge railroads, it was reasonably profitable at first. For the fiscal year ending 1880, the balance sheet shows a profit of $13,394.44 and a return on investment of 6%. Passenger traffic earned $9,345.36, almost all local, with only 12 passengers ticketed onward to connecting lines. Local freight earned $24,554,61 and through freight, originating or ending on other lines, earned $11,966.84. By tonnage, 56% of the freight was grain, 16 percent was livestock, and 13 percent was lumber. No other category made up more than 4% of the freight. Between 1883 and 1889, however, the line paid no dividends and managed to eke out a profit of under $13,000, from which it paid the property taxes of the Burlington and Western, which ran at a net loss during that period. By 1893, the line had returned to a modestly profitable condition.

The Burlington and Western with a route that closely paralleled by the Iowa Central, was not initially profitable. Passenger earnings for 1894 were 11,016.58, and freight earnings were $38,860.80. Over the first 6 years of operation, it ran up a deficit of just over $43,000.

The B&NW and B&W both owned railway post office cars. Post office reports indicated that these cars made 6 trips a week out and back. In 1884, the B&W carried an average of 78 pounds of mail daily at an average speed of 12.75 MPH, including station stops along the route.

Just about every station on both lines had a local grain elevator for outgoing grain, but the Harrison Elevator in Burlington, Iowa handled all grain destined beyond the system. This elevator handled 4,000,000 bushels in 1882. The Elevator was a frame building located on the corner of Front and Court streets and had a capacity of 150,000 bushels, powered by a 60 horse-power steam engine. The elevator had a pair of bridges across the tracks evidently used for loading and unloading grain.

After 1890, Coal was a major commodity handled by the Burlington and Western. Oskaloosa was a major coal producer in the late 19th century, and the Burlington and Western served at least two mines in the area. Thomas Long & Brothers opened a shaft 90 feet (27 m) deep in 1890 on the Iowa Central tracks near the west city limits of Oskaloosa. 10 to 20 miners could produce 100 tons per day. To reach this mine, the B&W built a track west along 7th avenue in Oskaloosa, just south of the Rock Island tracks, crossing the Iowa Central wye and then paralleling the Iowa Central tracks to the mine. The Long Brothers mine closed in 1899.

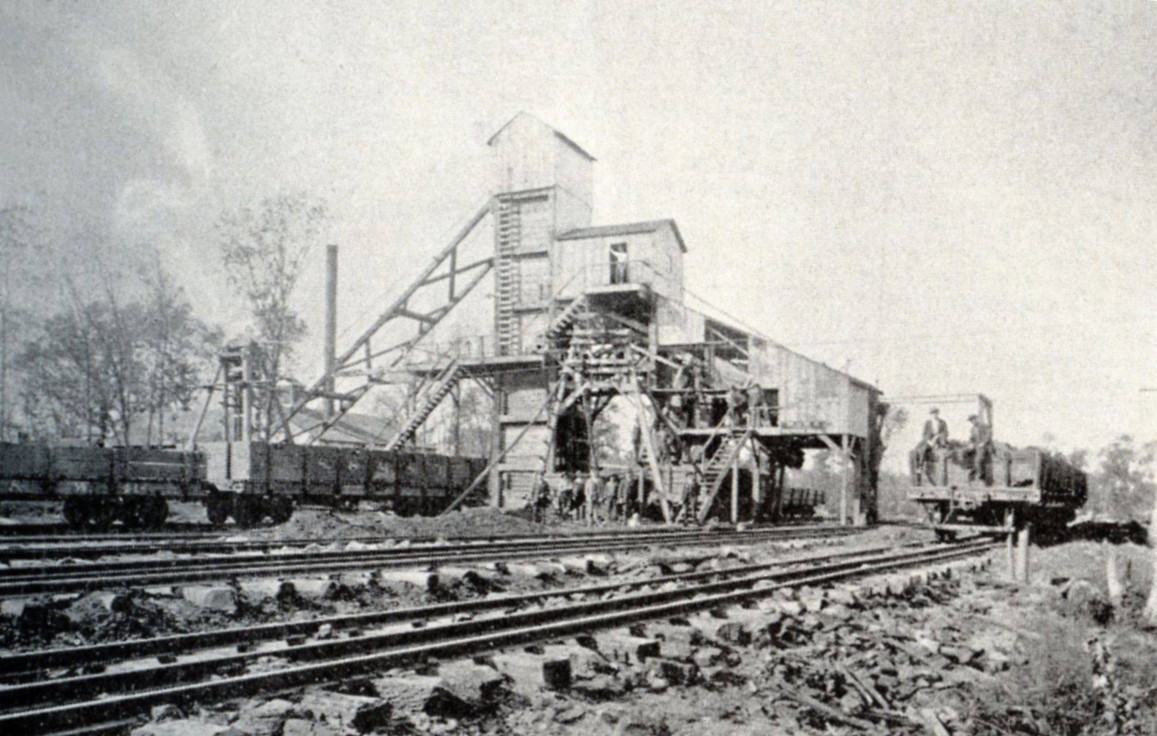
Lost Creek Fuel Company shaft number 1 in 1896.

The Lost Creek Fuel Company had several mines about 10 miles (16 km) south of Oskaloosa. These mines were served by both the B&W and the Iowa Central. Lost Creek Shaft No. 1 operated from 1895 to 1901. In 1897, it employed 200 men and shipped 20 carloads of coal daily. Shaft 2 opened in 1901. Shaft 3 opened in 1904. The siding serving these mines was built in 1895 and chartered as the Lost Creek Railway in 1896. It left the B&W and Chicago and Northwestern mainlines at Stark where they crossed, and also connected with the Iowa Central before running 4 miles (6.4 km) south and 2 miles (3.2 km) west. The line is not listed as owning any locomotives or rolling stock. The 1896 photograph of the pit head and tipple clearly shows at least 4 lines of dual-gauge track at the tipple, suggesting that the entire short line was dual gauge. In early 1900, the Chicago and North Western began operating over the north half of the Lost Creek Railway as they began constructing their branch to Buxton, Iowa, opened in 1901. A photo of Lost Creek Shaft 2, opened in 1901, does not show any dual-gauge trackage. Shaft 2 was the site of Iowa's worst mine disaster in 1902.

In Burlington, the BCR&N and the B&NW both had connections to what must have been a dual-gauge siding that went up to the foot of the bluff behind the BCR&N Freight House to deliver coal to fuel the massive pumps of the Burlington Water Company and the coal bins of the adjacent gas works.

== Equipment ==
The Burlington and North Western had a small roster. Mixed trains were the rule; in 1881, the average train had 7 freight cars and 2 passenger cars. As of 1880, the B&NW owned 3 locomotives (one newly purchased), 3 passenger cars, 2 mail/baggage combines, 39 boxcars and 11 flatcars. The heaviest locomotive weighed only 20.35 tons, and the heaviest passenger car weighed 10.25 tons. By 1884, the count of boxcars (including stock cars) had increased to 52 and the number of flatcars (including coal cars) had increased to 21. The line also had 2 cabooses, a necessity because none of the equipment was equipped with automatic brakes. All passenger equipment was equipped with Miller platforms and couplers. By 1892, the line had 2 passenger, 2 freight, and 1 switch engine, 3 first-class passenger cars, 3 combines, 1 baggage/express car, 101 box cars, 6 stock cars, and 8 flat cars. Link and pin coupleres were still in use, but air brakes were in use.

The Burlington and Western's roster was equally modest. In 1884, it had 3 locomotives, the heaviest weighing 22 tons, 2 passenger cars, 2 baggage cars (including mail cars), 70 boxcars, 20 stock cars, 15 flatcars and 15 coal cars. As with the B&NW, no automatic brakes were in use, and passenger equipment used Miller platforms. By 1892, the line had 2 passenger and 2 freight locomotives, 2 first-class passenger cars, 2 combines, 2 baggage/express cars, 115 boxcars, 22 stock cars, 74 flat cars and 55 coal cars. Coupling and braking systems matched those of the B&NW.

In February 1885, the B&NW engine house burned, destroying engine number 1. The B&NW purchased a replacement from the Denver, Utah and Pacific, a 2-8-6T Mason Bogie built in 1882. This became the new number 1 on the line, renumbered 11 in 1889. This was the largest locomotive used on these lines.

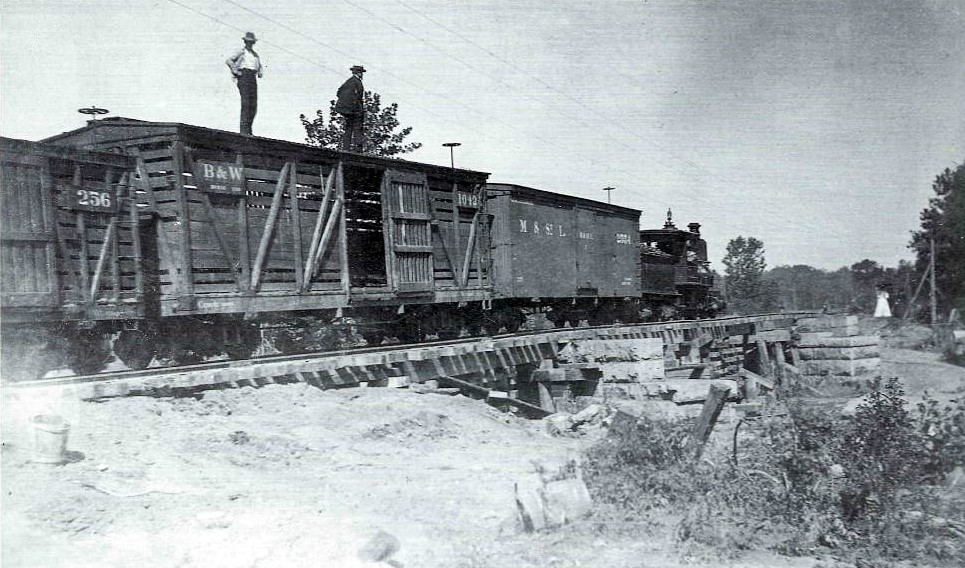
A northbound B&W train crossing Dry Branch Creek on the BCR&N mainline circa 1898. Two standard-gauge cars riding on narrow-gauge trucks head the train.

The problem of interchanging freight across the break of gauge to standard gauge lines was eventually solved by truck exchange. Incoming standard gauge cars were lifted off of their trucks using hydraulic jacks so that narrow gauge trucks could be rolled in. The reverse procedure was used for outgoing freight, so long as it was on cars that were compatible with standard gauge requirements. Truck exchange was not confined to freight cars; for example, the general manager's business car was transferred to standard gauge trucks for his return home after the gauge was widened.

== Gauge widening ==
The possibility of widening the B&NW/B&W system to standard gauge was investigated as early as 1884, but serious examination of the problem only began in 1894, and work began in 1900. Preliminary work, done over two summers, involved replacing all of the 30 and 35 pound rail with 48 pound rail (on the B&NW) and 65 pound rail (on the B&W) and replacing over 85,000 railroad ties with ties long enough for standard gauge track.

Another preliminary job involved planing seats in the ties spaced for standard gauge rails. This was done with a custom-made steam-powered planer mounted on a flatcar, essentially a pair of dado sets mounted on a shaft so that one dado set cut a new rail seat on each side of the tie. The final preparatory step was to drive all of the outside spikes needed to hold the standard-gauge rail and to pull as many inside spikes as was safe. The railroad encouraged press coverage of these preparations.

With these preliminary jobs done, the actual gauge change was done on Sunday, June 29, 1902. Traffic was suspended for just 9 hours, with the last narrow-gauge trains used to drop off work crews and the first standard-gauge trains picking up the crews. 28 crews of 16 men each did the work of pulling the last spikes on the inside of each rail, shifting both rails outward, and driving new spikes. Several crews managed to work at sustained rates of one mile per hour when there were no complications, despite the heavy rains that fell that day. Coffee and barrels of water were set out along the line for the crews, and each worker was provided with 15 sandwiches and a dozen hard-boiled eggs to fuel the day's work.

== Legacy ==
The former B&W line to Oskaloosa was abandoned in 1934, with segments sold to the Minneapolis and St. Louis (M&StL), the successor of the Iowa Central. In effect, the M&StL was finally able to undo awkward route choices that had been forced on the Iowa Central when these lines were built.

The last train on the line to Washington was in 1979, and the line was abandoned after a wreck destroyed one of the bridges north of Burlington. The Rock Island, successor of the Burlington, Cedar Rapids and Northern owned that bridge and could not afford to repair it. The only remaining segment of the line is the trackage up Front Street in Burlington to the industrial area just south of Flint Creek, now the Burlington Junction Railway.
