= Rubio, Iowa =

- unincorporated community
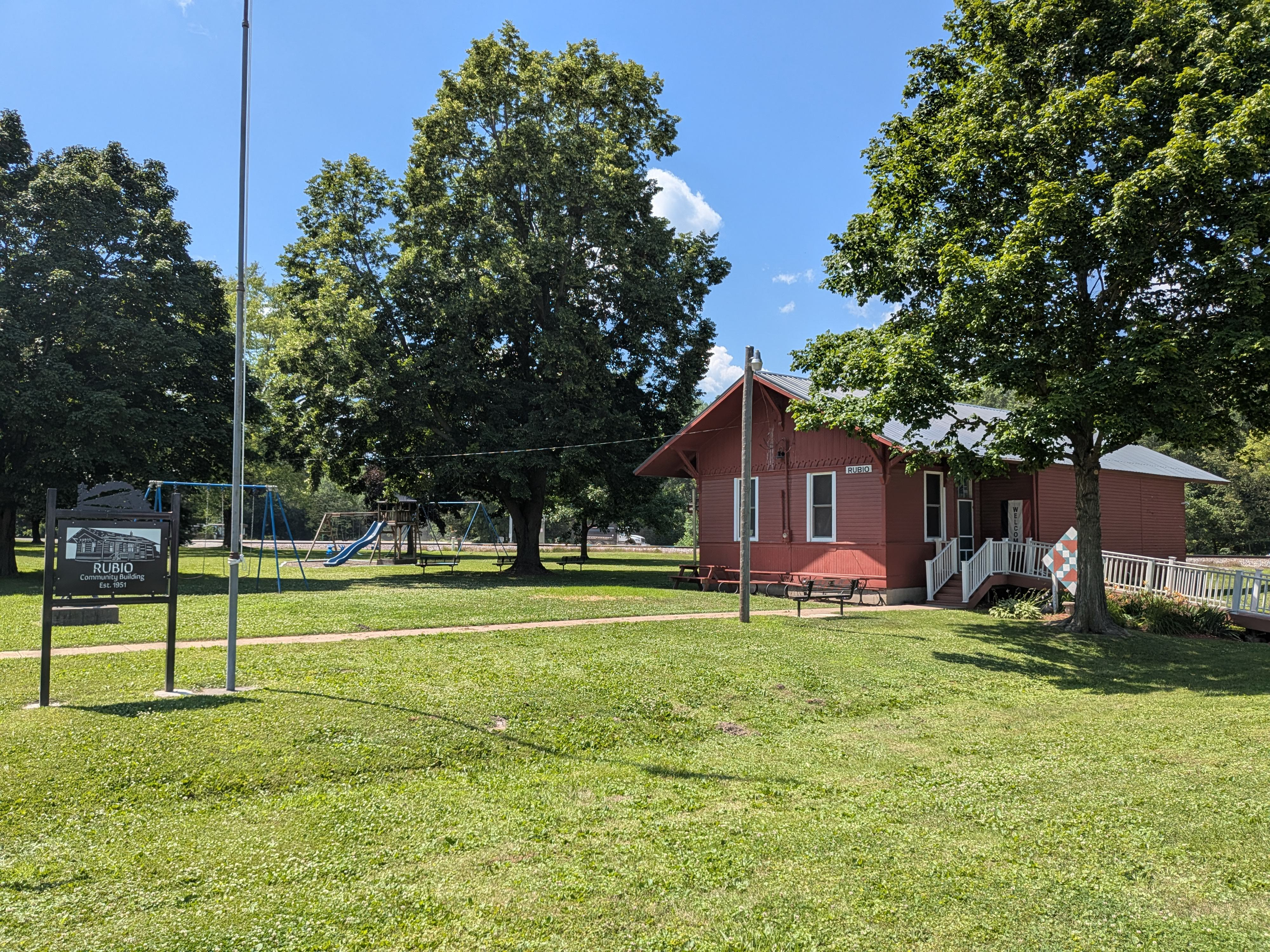
- Rubio Community Building
- Interactive map of Rubio, Iowa
- Coordinates: 41°13′16″N 91°56′15″W
- Country: United States
- State: Iowa
- County: Washington County
- Established: 1900
- Elevation: 640 ft (200 m)
- Time zone: UTC-6 (Central (CST))
  - Summer (DST): UTC-5 (CDT)
- GNIS feature ID: 460841

Rubio is an unincorporated community in southwest Washington County, Iowa, United States. It is located on County Highway G67 approximately three miles northeast of Richland in adjacent Keokuk, County. The Skunk River flows past the north side of the community.

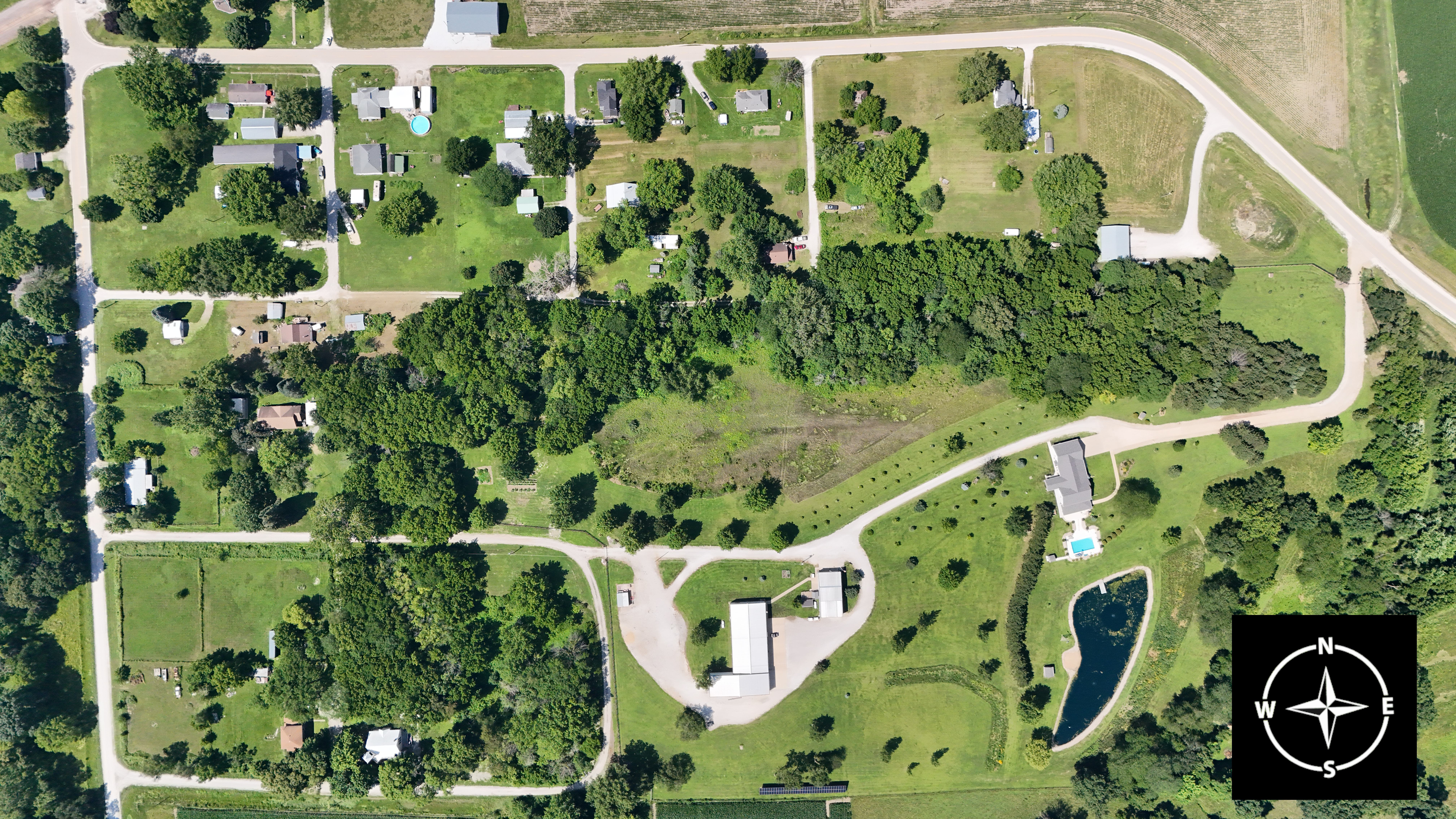
An aerial view of Rubio on July 1, 2025

== History ==
Rubio was founded in 1900 when the Milwaukee Road railway was built through the area. Rubio was named after Mexican statesman Pascual Ortiz Rubio, who would later become the president of Mexico.

The Rubio Savings Bank opened in Rubio in 1906; the main office moved to Brighton in 1946.

In 1910 the Rubio School opened. The two-classroom school operated until 1960; enrollment at that time was 10 students. The building was sold at auction in 1962 and was torn down; the floor joists were later used in a house in Richland. The population was 140 in 1940.

The Rubio Lawn Social and Jubilee, held in conjunction with the American Bicentennial, was held on August 7 and 8, 1976. Activities included a postal award ceremony and a parade.

== Education ==
The Pekin Community School District serves Rubio.
