= 2-8-6T =

Locomotive wheel arrangement

In the Whyte notation for describing steam locomotive wheel arrangement, a 2-8-6 is a locomotive with a two-wheel leading truck, eight driving wheels, and a six-wheel trailing truck. All 2-8-6 locomotives constructed have been Mason Bogie tank locomotives.

== Equivalent classifications ==
Other equivalent classifications are:

- UIC classification: 1D3 (also known as German classification and Italian classification)
- French classification: 143
- Turkish classification: 48
- Swiss classification: 4/8

In the UIC classification as applied in Germany and Italy, a rigid-framed locomotive of this arrangement would be 1'D3', and the Mason bogie (1'D)'3'.

== Usage ==
Four Mason Bogies of this type were built for the Denver, South Park and Pacific Railroad; #25 Alpine, #26 Rico, #27 Roaring Fork and #28 Denver. They were narrow gauge locomotives of 3 ft (914 mm) gauge. Two more went to the Denver, Utah and Pacific, #10 Middle Park and #19 Denver. The DU&P sold one of the latter to the Burlington and Northwestern Railway, a narrow-gauge affiliate of the CB&Q operating in Iowa.
