= Farson, Iowa =

- Unincorporated community
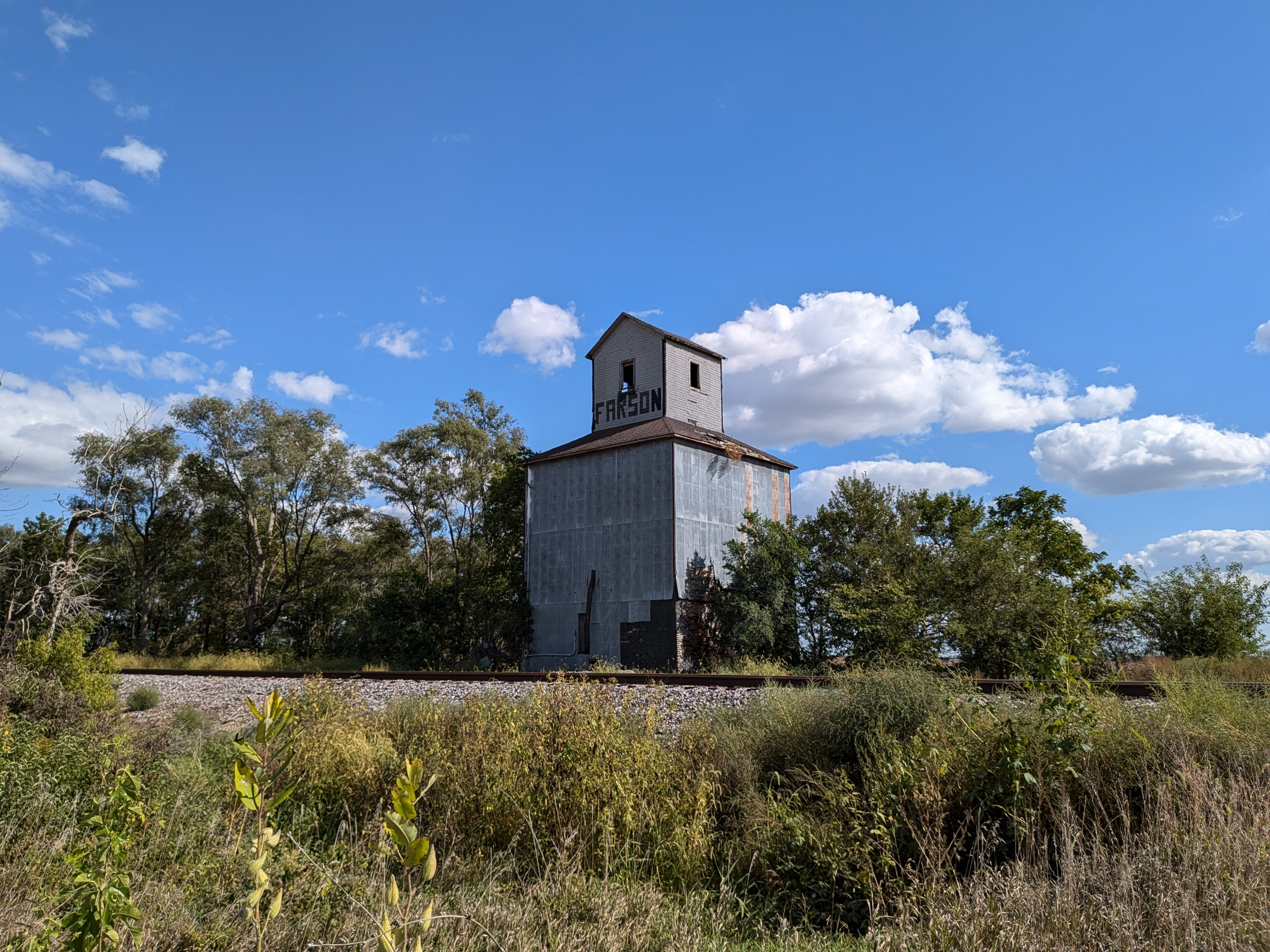
- A railroad service building in Farson

- Location within Iowa
- Coordinates: 41°07′20″N 92°15′19″W
- Country: United States
- State: Iowa
- County: Wapello
- Elevation: 797 ft (243 m)
- Time zone: UTC-6 (Central (CST))
  - Summer (DST): UTC-5 (CDT)
- Area code: 641
- GNIS feature ID: 456559

Farson is an unincorporated community in Competine Township in northeastern Wapello County, Iowa, United States. The community is located four miles south of Martinsburg on the Farson Road. Farson is in the rural zip code (52563) of Hedrick and in the Pekin school district.

== History ==
Farson was laid out in 1902.

The population was 86 in 1940.

A Class II railroad running from Kansas City, Missouri, to Chicago marks the southern edge of the community. The railroad has been owned by the Iowa, Chicago and Eastern Railroad since July 31, 2002; by I&M Rail Link from April 5, 1997, to July 30, 2002; by the Soo Line Railroad from January 1, 1986 – April 4, 1997; and by MILW until December 31, 1985.

In 1960, the Farson High School closed in a consolidation with the Pekin Community School System. In 1970, the middle and elementary schools consolidated with Pekin as well, closing the Farson school.
