= Coppock, Iowa =

- City
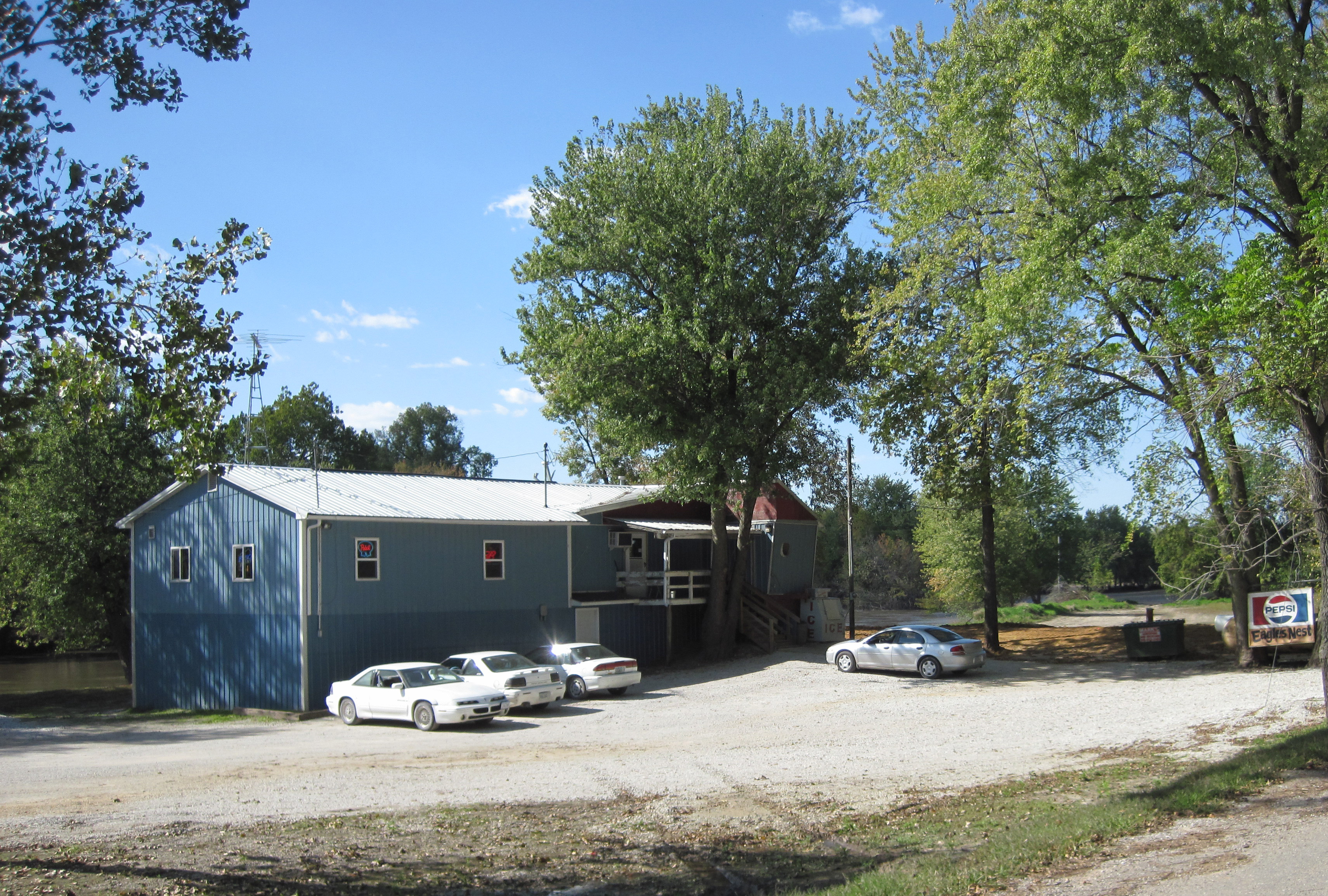
- Eagle's Nest in Coppock

- Location of Coppock, Iowa
- Coordinates: 41°09′49″N 91°42′54″W
- Country: United States
- State: Iowa
- Counties: Henry, Washington, Jefferson

Area
  - Total: 0.24 sq mi (0.62 km^{2})
  - Land: 0.23 sq mi (0.60 km^{2})
  - Water: 0.0077 sq mi (0.02 km^{2})
- Elevation: 715 ft (218 m)

Population (2020)
  - Total: 36
  - Density: 156.0/sq mi (60.24/km^{2})
- Time zone: UTC-6 (Central (CST))
  - Summer (DST): UTC-5 (CDT)
- ZIP code: 52654
- Area code: 319
- FIPS code: 19-16140
- GNIS feature ID: 2393632

Coppock is a city in Henry, Jefferson, and Washington counties in the U.S. state of Iowa. The population was 36 at the 2020 census.

The Washington County portion of Coppock is part of the Iowa City, Iowa Metropolitan Statistical Area. There is only one business open to the public, a tavern/boat landing.

== History ==
John Coppock and Thomas Tucker built a grist mill and saw mill on the Skunk River in 1859. The grist mill was on the north bank of the river about 1/8 mile (1/4 km) east of what is now Locust St. John's son Thomas Coppock built a general store nearby, and the Coppock businesses became a social center for the surrounding area. By 1877, when John Coppock died, the grist mill was a four-story building, and the operation included 360 acres of land, 4 houses and a ferry.

Coppock's mill was the site of a battle in 1882 between the Iowa Central Railway and the narrow-gauge Burlington and Western Railway for locations of bridges across the Skunk River. The Burlington and Western was later widened and taken over by the Chicago, Burlington and Quincy and the Iowa Central was taken over by the Minneapolis and St. Louis.

With the coming of the railroads there was major development around the mill. The town of Coppock was platted in 1882, with 4 city blocks. The two railroads paralleled each other in a broad curve south of the town, each with its own depot, passing siding, stock yard and, water tank. The Burlington and Western also had a coaling station. John Coppock Jr. bought the mill and dam in 1883, and by 1887, the mill was a 40 by 50 foot, six-story building. Ice harvesting became an important winter business in this era, the Burlington and Western built a siding for loading ice. The Burlington and Western also advertised the availability of gravel and unlimited quantities of crushed-stone from Coppock.

By the end of the century, Trite's Park and Brown's Park competed for the tourist business, offering swimming, boating, picnic grounds and facilities for group activities. There was even a small steamboat available for charter trips on the river and a "tobbogan slide" into the water, all within walking distance of the railroad stations. Excursions were coordinated with the Burlington and Western Railway, which allowed a passenger car to be chartered from Burlington, set out on a siding at Coppock for the day, and then picked up by the evening train for the return trip to Burlington. These parks were destroyed by a major flood in 1903.

Coppock was incorporated as a city on Feb. 24, 1902. By that time, the town had a hotel, multiple general stores and a blacksmith shop in addition to the mill. The population peaked at over 100 between 1910 and 1920, but declined to 93 by 1930. The former Coppock mill was moved to Wayland in 1917. At that time, the two railroads still had The Burlington Route stopped service through Coppock in 1934 and pulled up the tracks a year later. In 1935, the road from Wayland to Coppock was graveled, making it passable year round. The Minneapolis and St. Louis continued to operate through 1971.

== Geography ==
Coppock is located on the Skunk River just above its confluence with Crooked Creek.

According to the United States Census Bureau, the city has a total area of 0.24 square miles (0.62 km^{2}), of which 0.23 square miles (0.60 km^{2}) is land and 0.01 square miles (0.03 km^{2}) is water.

== Demographics ==
Historical populations
Year	Pop.	±%
1910	105	—
1920	104	−1.0%
1930	93	−10.6%
1940	93	+0.0%
1950	81	−12.9%
1960	61	−24.7%
1970	58	−4.9%
1980	47	−19.0%
1990	50	+6.4%
2000	57	+14.0%
2010	47	−17.5%
2020	36	−23.4%
Source:"U.S. Census website". United States Census Bureau. and Iowa Data Center; Source: U.S. Decennial Census

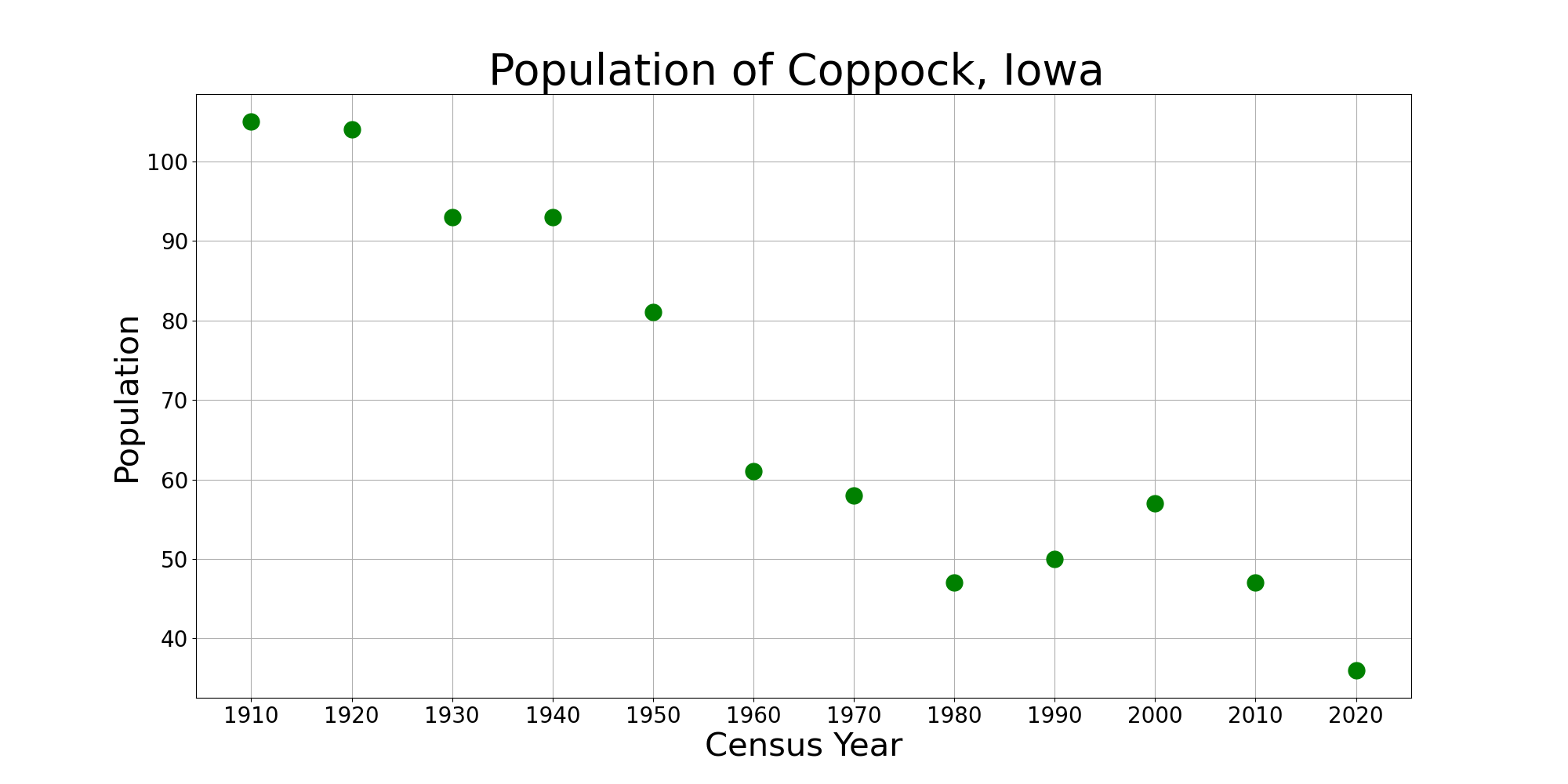
The population of Coppock, Iowa from US census data

=== 2020 census ===
As of the census of 2020, there were 36 people, 10 households, and 9 families residing in the city. The population density was 156.0 inhabitants per square mile (60.2/km^{2}). There were 18 housing units at an average density of 78.0 per square mile (30.1/km^{2}). The racial makeup of the city was 91.7% White, 0.0% Black or African American, 0.0% Native American, 0.0% Asian, 0.0% Pacific Islander, 5.6% from other races and 2.8% from two or more races. Hispanic or Latino persons of any race comprised 2.8% of the population.

Of the 10 households, 60.0% of which had children under the age of 18 living with them, 60.0% were married couples living together, 0.0% were cohabitating couples, 20.0% had a female householder with no spouse or partner present and 20.0% had a male householder with no spouse or partner present. 10.0% of all households were non-families. 10.0% of all households were made up of individuals, 0.0% had someone living alone who was 65 years old or older.

The median age in the city was 33.0 years. 27.8% of the residents were under the age of 20; 2.8% were between the ages of 20 and 24; 33.3% were from 25 and 44; 19.4% were from 45 and 64; and 16.7% were 65 years of age or older. The gender makeup of the city was 61.1% male and 38.9% female.

=== 2010 census ===
As of the census of 2010, there were 47 people, 17 households, and 14 families living in the city. The population density was 204.3 inhabitants per square mile (78.9/km^{2}). There were 19 housing units at an average density of 82.6 per square mile (31.9/km^{2}). The racial makeup of the city was 93.6% White and 6.4% from two or more races.

There were 17 households, of which 23.5% had children under the age of 18 living with them, 58.8% were married couples living together, 11.8% had a female householder with no husband present, 11.8% had a male householder with no wife present, and 17.6% were non-families. 17.6% of all households were made up of individuals, and 11.8% had someone living alone who was 65 years of age or older. The average household size was 2.76 and the average family size was 2.79.

The median age in the city was 39.5 years. 17% of residents were under the age of 18; 15% were between the ages of 18 and 24; 23.5% were from 25 to 44; 27.7% were from 45 to 64; and 17% were 65 years of age or older. The gender makeup of the city was 48.9% male and 51.1% female.

=== 2000 census ===
As of the census of 2000, there were 57 people, 22 households, and 13 families living in the city. The population density was 243.7 inhabitants per square mile (94.1/km^{2}). There were 27 housing units at an average density of 115.4 per square mile (44.6/km^{2}). The racial makeup of the city was 98.25% White, and 1.75% from two or more races.

There were 22 households, out of which 27.3% had children under the age of 18 living with them, 45.5% were married couples living together, 13.6% had a female householder with no husband present, and 40.9% were non-families. 31.8% of all households were made up of individuals, and 13.6% had someone living alone who was 65 years of age or older. The average household size was 2.59 and the average family size was 3.46.

In the city, the population was spread out, with 28.1% under the age of 18, 7.0% from 18 to 24, 33.3% from 25 to 44, 15.8% from 45 to 64, and 15.8% who were 65 years of age or older. The median age was 36 years. For every 100 females, there were 90.0 males. For every 100 females age 18 and over, there were 95.2 males.

The median income for a household in the city was $26,750, and the median income for a family was $29,583. Males had a median income of $28,333 versus $13,750 for females. The per capita income for the city was $11,051. There were 15.4% of families and 30.4% of the population living below the poverty line, including 60.0% of under eighteens and 40.0% of those over 64.
