= Hedrick, Iowa =

- City
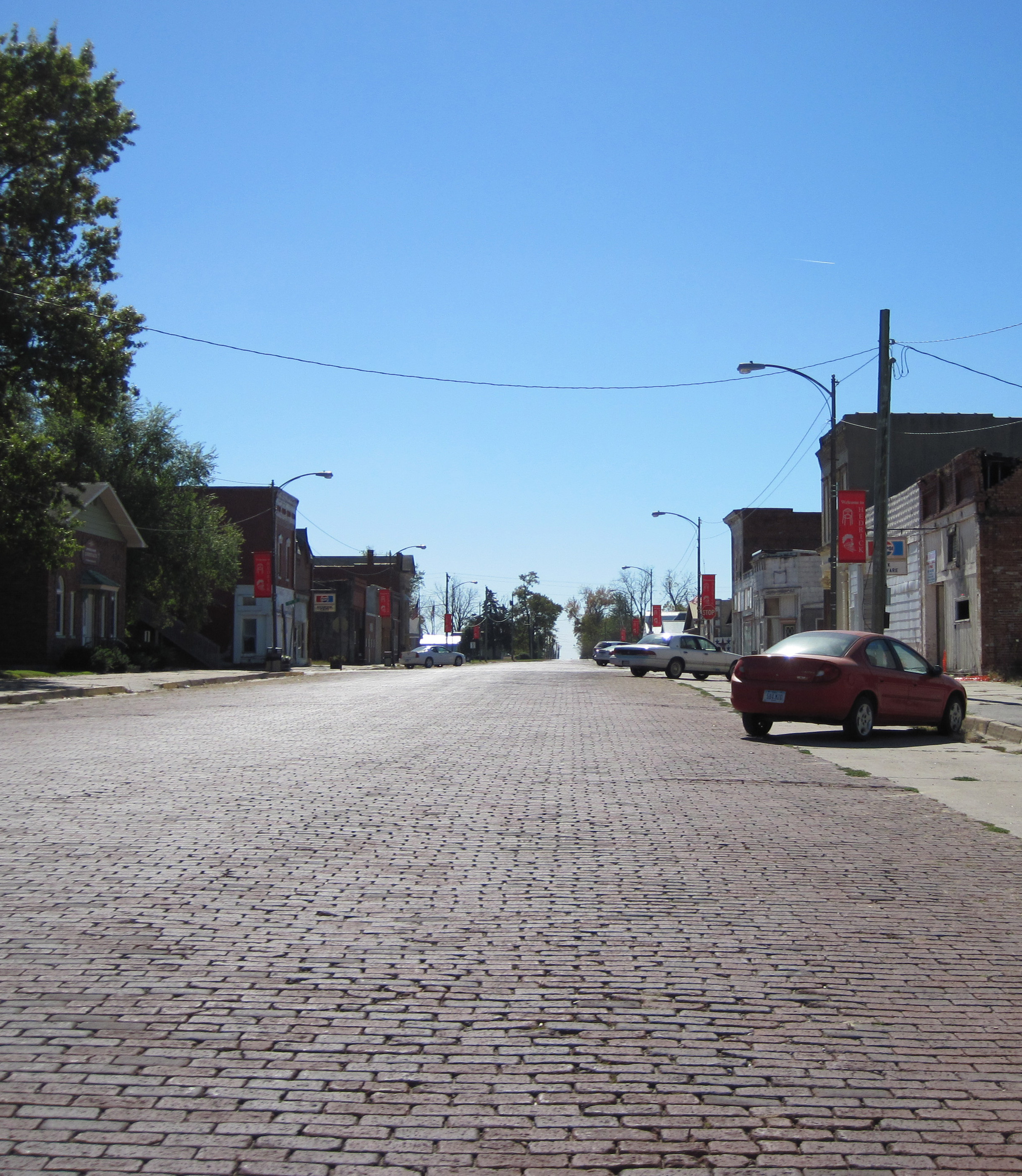
- Downtown Hedrick
- Motto: "Where Friends Meet"
- Location of Hedrick, Iowa
- Coordinates: 41°10′17″N 92°18′28″W
- Country: United States
- State: Iowa
- County: Keokuk

Area
  - Total: 1.56 sq mi (4.03 km^{2})
  - Land: 1.56 sq mi (4.03 km^{2})
  - Water: 0 sq mi (0.00 km^{2})
- Elevation: 820 ft (250 m)

Population (2020)
  - Total: 728
  - Density: 467.3/sq mi (180.43/km^{2})
- Time zone: UTC-6 (Central (CST))
  - Summer (DST): UTC-5 (CDT)
- ZIP code: 52563
- Area code: 641
- FIPS code: 19-35670
- GNIS feature ID: 2394345
- Website: Hedrick, Iowa

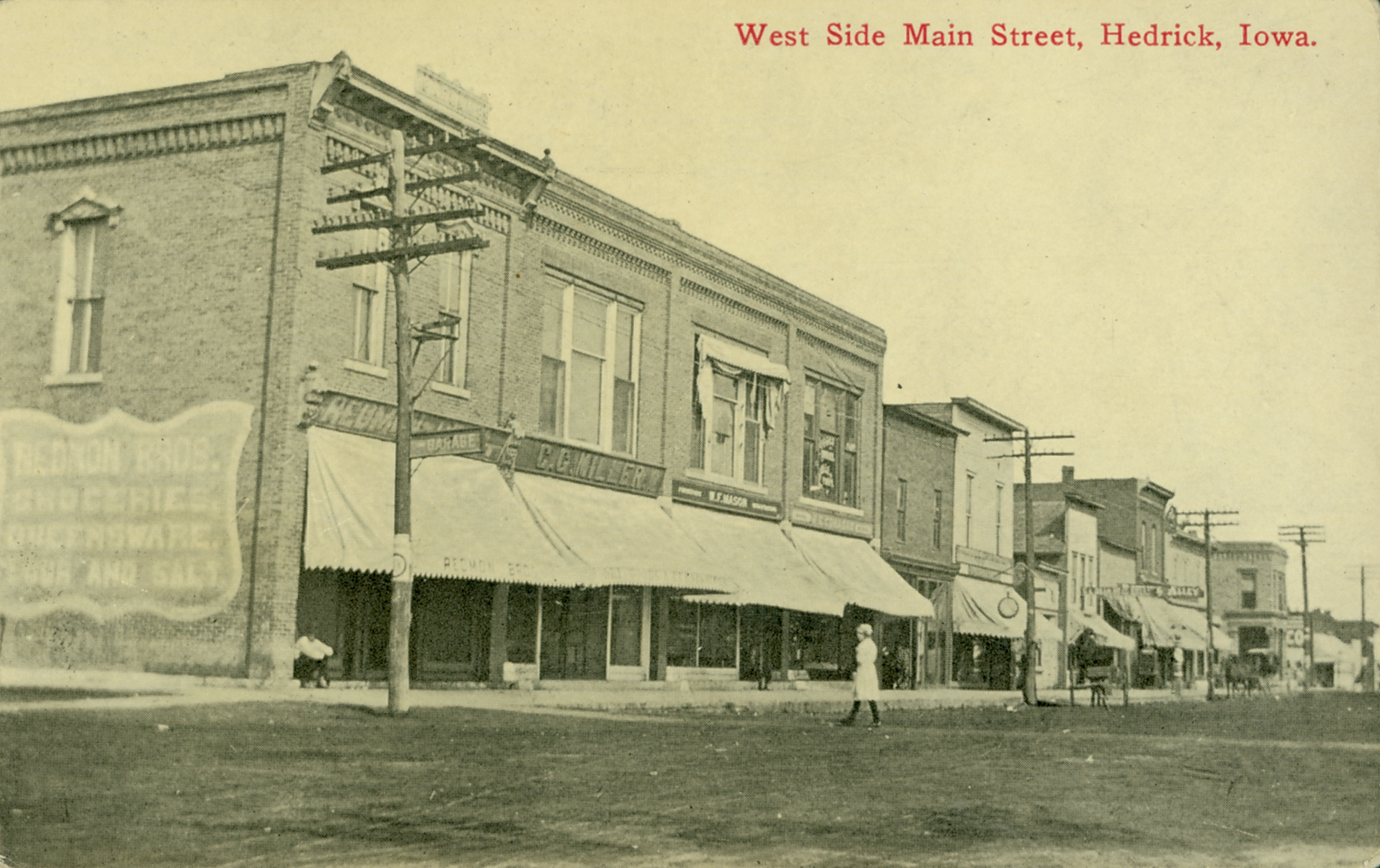
Main street 1910

Hedrick is a city in Keokuk County, Iowa, United States. The population was 728 at the time of the 2020 census.

== History ==
In 1882, the Burlington and Western Railway a narrow gauge line, and its competitor, the Iowa Central Railway, built competing east–west lines through the area. These crossed the Rock Island tracks here, so it was a natural location for a station and town.

Hedrick was incorporated on April 23, 1883. It was named for General Hedrick.

The Burlington and Western was widened to standard gauge in 1902 and merged into the Chicago, Burlington and Quincy a year later. The Minneapolis and St. Louis took over the Iowa Central around the same time, and the Burlington line was abandoned in 1934.

By 1991 several businesses in the community's main street closed, and the economy had declined. The school serving the town closed that year.

In 2023, the city was struck by an EF-4 rated tornado.

== Geography ==
According to the United States Census Bureau, the city has a total area of 1.53 square miles (3.96 km^{2}), all of it land.

== Demographics ==
Historical populations
Year	Pop.	±%
1890	592	—
1900	1,035	+74.8%
1910	978	−5.5%
1920	901	−7.9%
1930	810	−10.1%
1940	731	−9.8%
1950	733	+0.3%
1960	762	+4.0%
1970	790	+3.7%
1980	847	+7.2%
1990	810	−4.4%
2000	837	+3.3%
2010	764	−8.7%
2020	728	−4.7%
Source:"U.S. Census website". United States Census Bureau. and Iowa Data Center; Source: U.S. Decennial Census

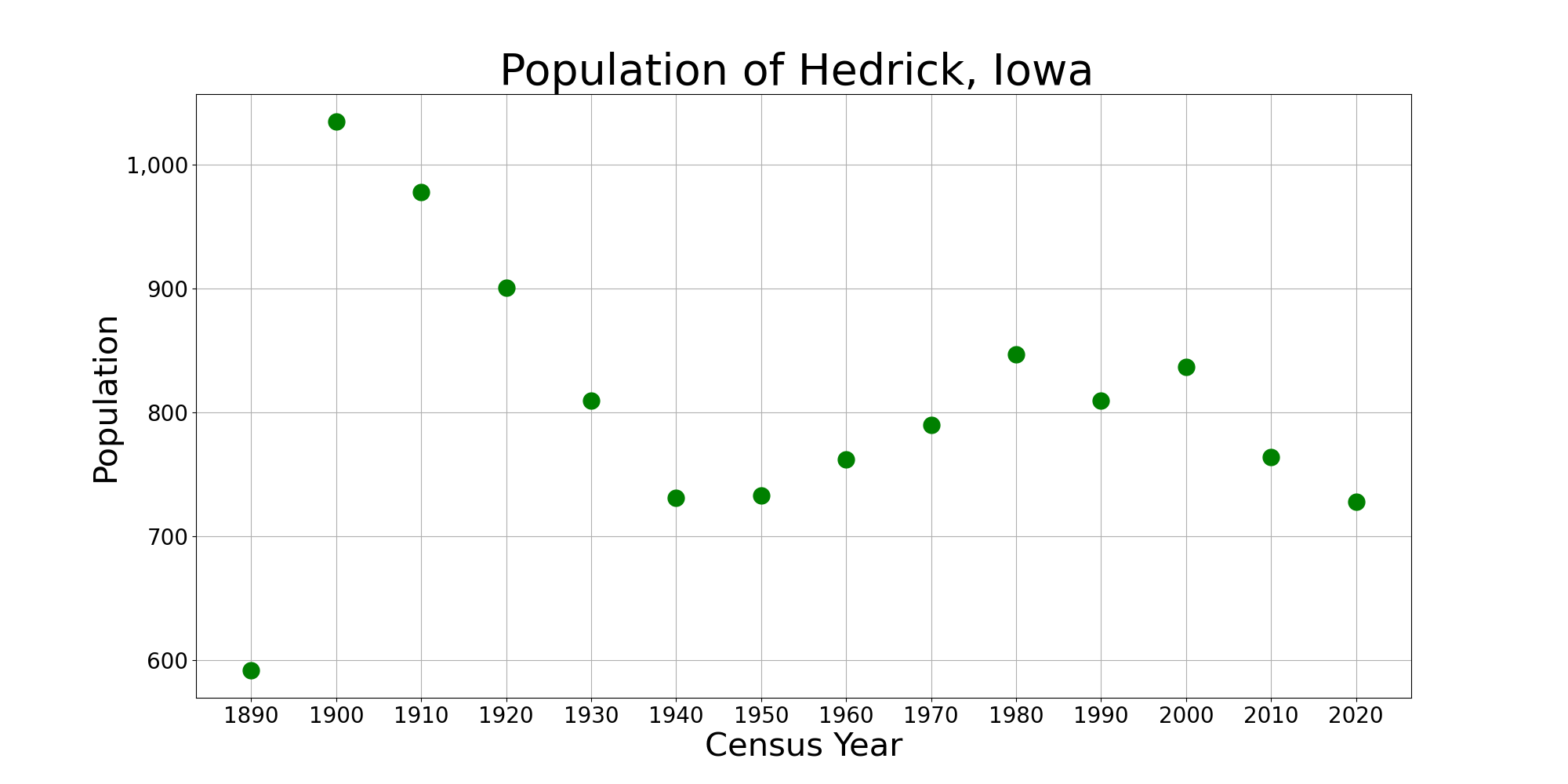
The population of Hedrick, Iowa from US census data

=== 2020 census ===
As of the census of 2020, there were 728 people, 303 households, and 196 families residing in the city. The population density was 467.3 inhabitants per square mile (180.4/km^{2}). There were 335 housing units at an average density of 215.0 per square mile (83.0/km^{2}). The racial makeup of the city was 96.2% White, 0.4% Black or African American, 0.1% Native American, 0.0% Asian, 0.0% Pacific Islander, 0.0% from other races and 3.3% from two or more races. Hispanic or Latino persons of any race comprised 2.5% of the population.

Of the 303 households, 26.1% of which had children under the age of 18 living with them, 46.5% were married couples living together, 9.2% were cohabitating couples, 23.8% had a female householder with no spouse or partner present and 20.5% had a male householder with no spouse or partner present. 35.3% of all households were non-families. 28.7% of all households were made up of individuals, 13.2% had someone living alone who was 65 years old or older.

The median age in the city was 39.8 years. 26.4% of the residents were under the age of 20; 4.5% were between the ages of 20 and 24; 24.9% were from 25 and 44; 26.4% were from 45 and 64; and 17.9% were 65 years of age or older. The gender makeup of the city was 50.8% male and 49.2% female.

=== 2010 census ===
As of the census of 2010, there were 764 people, 310 households, and 211 families living in the city. The population density was 499.3 inhabitants per square mile (192.8/km^{2}). There were 356 housing units at an average density of 232.7 per square mile (89.8/km^{2}). The racial makeup of the city was 98.3% White, 1.2% African American, and 0.5% from two or more races. Hispanic or Latino of any race were 1.4% of the population.

There were 310 households, of which 31.9% had children under the age of 18 living with them, 51.3% were married couples living together, 11.0% had a female householder with no husband present, 5.8% had a male householder with no wife present, and 31.9% were non-families. 28.4% of all households were made up of individuals, and 15.8% had someone living alone who was 65 years of age or older. The average household size was 2.46 and the average family size was 2.98.

The median age in the city was 37.7 years. 24.5% of residents were under the age of 18; 10% were between the ages of 18 and 24; 24.3% were from 25 to 44; 24.9% were from 45 to 64; and 16.4% were 65 years of age or older. The gender makeup of the city was 48.3% male and 51.7% female.

=== 2000 census ===
As of the census of 2000, there were 832 people, 335 households, and 233 families living in the city. The population density was 543.1 inhabitants per square mile (209.7/km^{2}). There were 371 housing units at an average density of 240.7 per square mile (92.9/km^{2}). The racial makeup of the city was 98.92% White, 0.12% Native American, 0.12% from other races, and 0.84% from two or more races. Hispanic or Latino of any race were 0.84% of the population.

There were 335 households, out of which 32.8% had children under the age of 18 living with them, 56.4% were married couples living together, 9.0% had a female householder with no husband present, and 30.4% were non-families. 28.1% of all households were made up of individuals, and 17.6% had someone living alone who was 65 years of age or older. The average household size was 2.50 and the average family size was 3.04.

In the city, the population was spread out, with 27.7% under the age of 18, 7.8% from 18 to 24, 26.3% from 25 to 44, 20.2% from 45 to 64, and 18.0% who were 65 years of age or older. The median age was 37 years. For every 100 females, there were 92.0 males. For every 100 females age 18 and over, there were 85.0 males.

The median income for a household in the city was $30,714, and the median income for a family was $37,917. Males had a median income of $30,000 versus $20,476 for females. The per capita income for the city was $14,166. About 9.0% of families and 13.5% of the population were below the poverty line, including 16.4% of those under age 18 and 10.8% of those age 65 or over.

== Economy ==
Few businesses are open in the old historic business district; most businesses open to the public are located along Highway 149.

== Arts and culture ==
Hedrick is notable for its well-preserved brick Main Street and its depot, formerly serving the Minneapolis and St. Louis Railway (east-west) and the Chicago, Rock Island and Pacific Railroad (north-south).

== Notable person ==
- Neal Edward Smith, Former U.S. Representative

== Education ==
Hedrick is in the Pekin Community School District, which operates schools in Pekin.

The former Hedrick Community School District was involuntarily dissolved by the State of Iowa on July 1, 1991, due to not meeting state requirements to be a certified school in that state. It was the first school district in Iowa to be closed involuntarily by the state government. Students in Hedrick itself were rezoned to Pekin schools.
