= Pekin Community School District =

Public school district in Pekin, Iowa, United States

Coordinates: 41.157307°N 92.165419°W

Address
- 1062 Birch Ave. Packwood, Iowa, 52580; United States
- Coordinates: 41.157307, -92.165419

District information
- Type: Public
- Motto: "Where everybody is somebody."
- Grades: K-12
- Established: 1961
- Superintendent: Dave Harper
- Schools: 2
- Budget: $11,755,000 (2020-21)
- NCES District ID: 1922440

Students and staff
- Students: 642 (2022-23)
- Teachers: 51.18 (on an FTE basis)
- Staff: 73.10 FTE
- Student–teacher ratio: 12.54
- Athletic conference: Southeast Iowa Superconference; North Division
- District mascot: Panthers
- Colors: Black, White and Red

Other information
- Affiliation(s): (Boys' sports) IHSAA and (Girls' Sports) IGHSAU
- Rivalries: The Backyard Brawl with Sigourney-Keota (mainly football)
- Website: www.pekincsd.org

Pekin Community School District is a rural public school district headquartered in Pekin, an unincorporated area in Jefferson County, Iowa, near Packwood.

It serves the following incorporated communities in Jefferson, Keokuk, Wapello, and Washington counties: Packwood, Hedrick, Martinsburg, Ollie, and Richland. Unincorporated areas served by Pekin Community Schools, aside from Pekin include: Abington,Rubio, and Highland Center.

== History ==
The school facilities were built on a former airport runway that was once used to train pilots.

In 1986 there was a proposal to merge the Pekin district and the Hedrick Community School District. By 1990 Iowa law allowed students to attend schools in other school districts, but at the time students had to pay tuition there. Hedrick sued the Pekin district over accepting students for free that should have been counted as out of district, as they lived with Pekin district-resident family members or friends of their family but not with their primary caregivers. A jury decided that the Hedrick district was damaged by this. The law was later modified so that a student can attend another school district for free.

In 1991, the district incorporated territory from the former Hedrick district after that district closed. The expected enrollment for all Pekin schools combined for fall 1991 was 800 students. A draft of a state proposal to merge much of Hedrick into Pekin anticipated that Pekin would take in about 85% of the Hedrick students.

In 2016, the district agreed to begin a superintendent-sharing arrangement with the Sigourney Community School District.

The district proposed a $55 million bond in 2017.

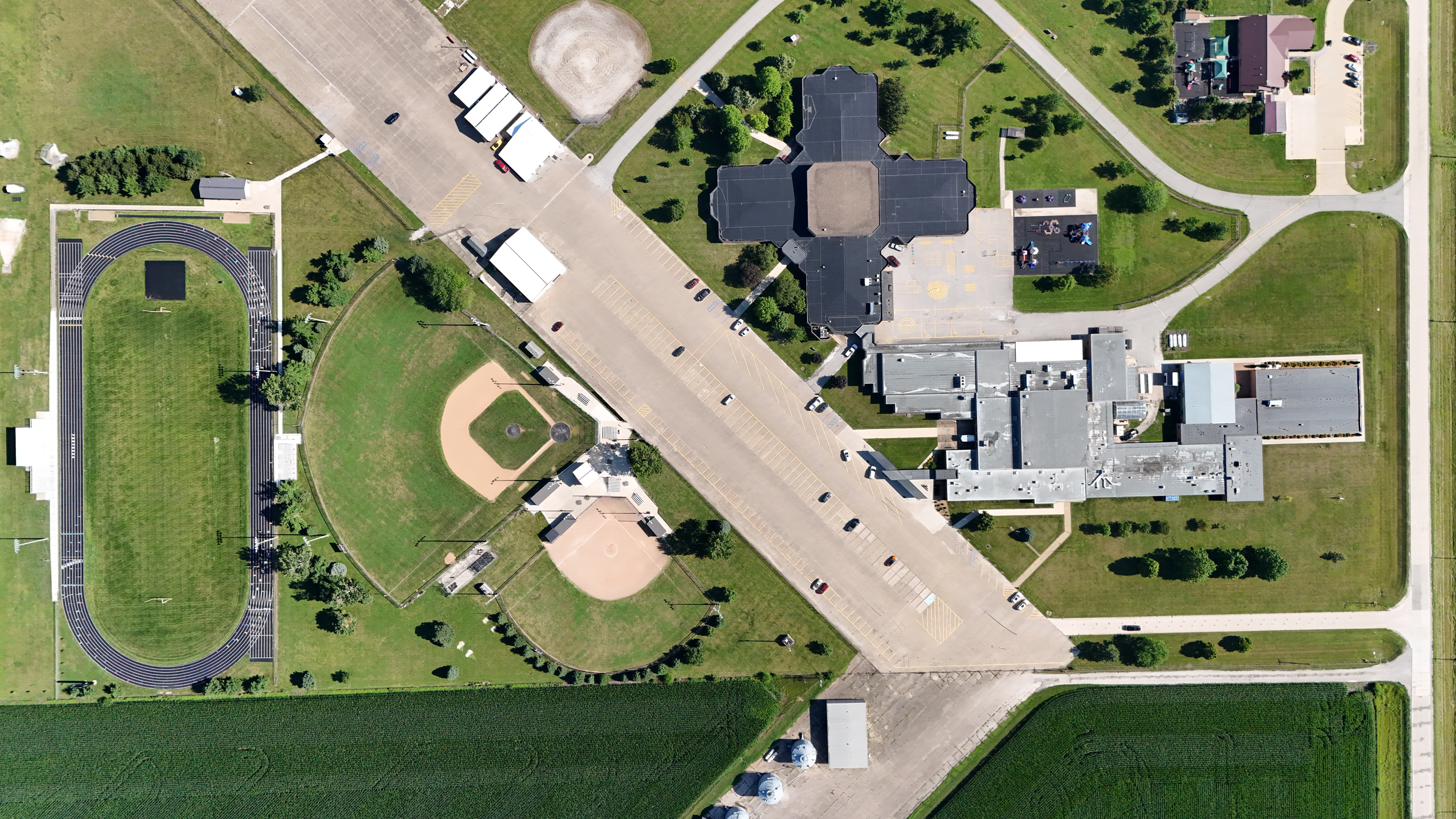
The school complex in Pekin

== Schools ==
The district operates two schools in a single facility near Pekin:

- Pekin Elementary School
- Pekin Community Junior/Senior High School

== Athletics ==
The Panthers compete in the Southeast Iowa Superconference (North Division), in the following sports:

- Boys' & Girls' Cross country
- Girls' Volleyball
- Boys' & Girls' Wrestling
- Boys' & Girls' Basketball
- Boys' & Girls' Track and field
- Boys' Baseball
- Girls' Softball

For American Football, the Panthers compete in Iowa Class A District 6 (As of 2025).

== Student body ==
In early 1991 the district had about 576 students. Early that year 32 children who lived in the boundaries of the Hedrick school district attended school in the Pekin school district, prior to the absorbing of much of the Hedrick district.

== Notable alumni ==
Keaton Winn, pitcher for the San Francisco Giants.

== See also ==
- List of school districts in Iowa
- List of high schools in Iowa
