= Martinsburg, Iowa =

- City
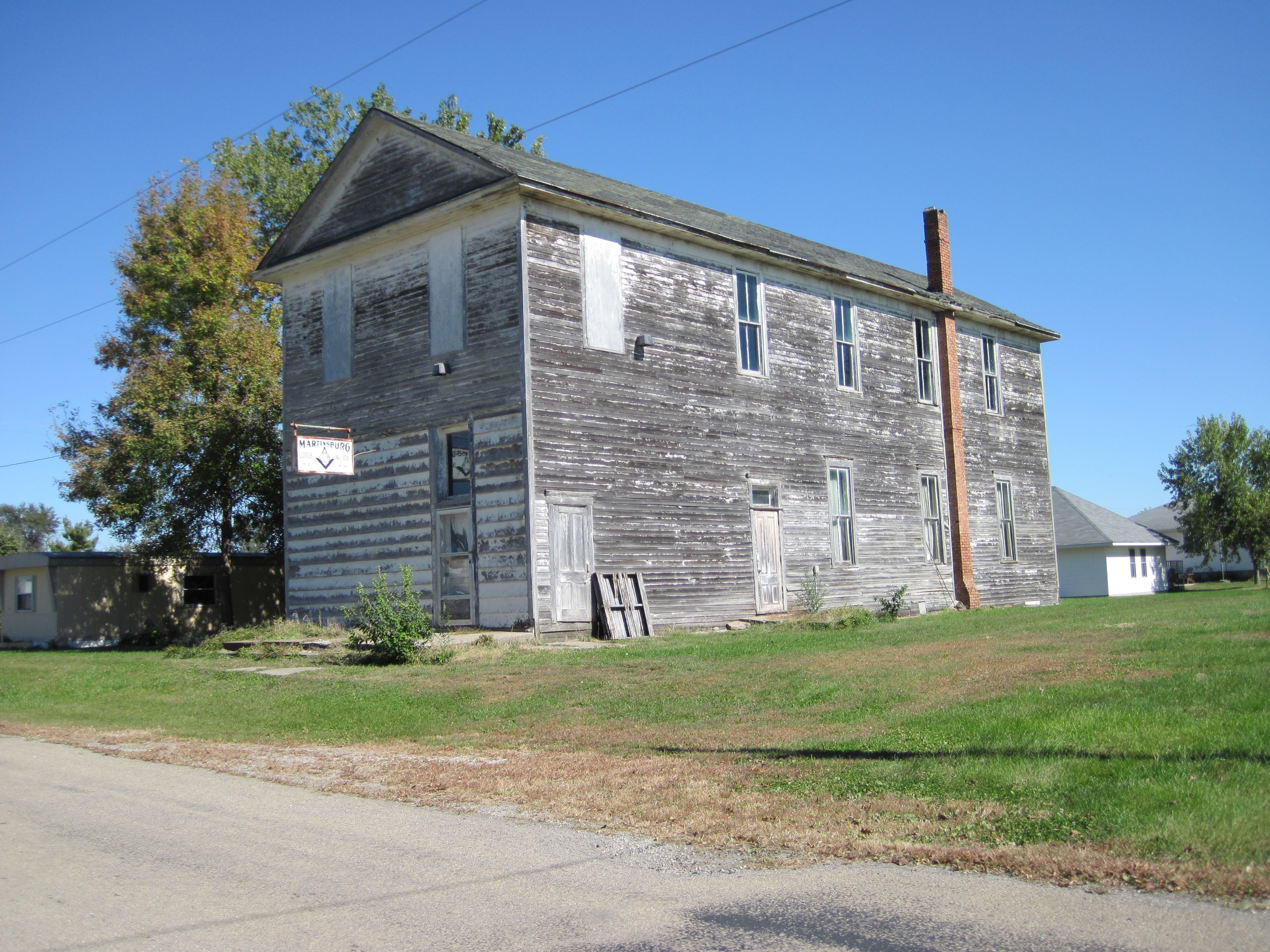
- Abandoned Mason's lodge in Martinsburg

- Location of Martinsburg, Iowa
- Coordinates: 41°10′44″N 92°15′06″W
- Country: United States
- State: Iowa
- County: Keokuk

Area
  - Total: 0.37 sq mi (0.97 km^{2})
  - Land: 0.37 sq mi (0.97 km^{2})
  - Water: 0 sq mi (0.00 km^{2})
- Elevation: 804 ft (245 m)

Population (2020)
  - Total: 110
  - Density: 293.9/sq mi (113.48/km^{2})
- Time zone: UTC-6 (Central (CST))
  - Summer (DST): UTC-5 (CDT)
- ZIP code: 52568
- Area code: 319
- FIPS code: 19-49935
- GNIS feature ID: 2395031

Martinsburg is a city in Keokuk County, Iowa, United States. The population was 110 at the time of the 2020 census.

== History ==
In 1861, Martinsburg was a half-mile long row of houses mostly on the north side of the road. In 1874, Martinsburg had two general stores, a hotel, and a Presbyterian church. There were two physicians, and a wagonmaker who also had a vineyard. The proprietors of a nearby sawmill and grain mill also lived in town.

The Burlington and Western Railway arrived in Martinsburg in late 1882. This was a narrow gauge line, widened to standard gauge in 1902 and taken over by the Chicago, Burlington and Quincy. The Minneapolis and St. Louis arrived in Martinsburg at about the same time. The two lines passed a few blocks north of the original town center, paralleling each other west of town, and diverging to the east. The CB&Q tracks through Martinsburg were sold to in 1934 to the M&StL.

By 1887, Martinsburg had been expanded by 5 subdivisions and it had gained a second church, a second hotel and a post office. In addition to the two railroad depots, there was a brickworks that mostly made drainage tile, served by the Iowa Central, and a creamery, a gristmill and a grain elevator, served by the Burlington and Western.

== Geography ==
According to the United States Census Bureau, the city has a total area of 0.38 square miles (0.98 km^{2}), all of it land.

== Demographics ==
Historical populations
| Year | Pop. | ±% |
|---|---|---|
| 1880 | 154 | — |
| 1890 | 322 | +109.1% |
| 1900 | 332 | +3.1% |
| 1910 | 285 | −14.2% |
| 1920 | 278 | −2.5% |
| 1930 | 223 | −19.8% |
| 1940 | 218 | −2.2% |
| 1950 | 219 | +0.5% |
| 1960 | 172 | −21.5% |
| 1970 | 140 | −18.6% |
| 1980 | 174 | +24.3% |
| 1990 | 157 | −9.8% |
| 2000 | 126 | −19.7% |
| 2010 | 112 | −11.1% |
| 2020 | 110 | −1.8% |
Source:"U.S. Census website". United States Census Bureau. and Iowa Data Center; Source: U.S. Decennial Census

=== 2020 census ===
As of the census of 2020, there were 110 people, 44 households, and 28 families residing in the city. The population density was 293.9 inhabitants per square mile (113.5/km^{2}). There were 46 housing units at an average density of 122.9 per square mile (47.5/km^{2}). The racial makeup of the city was 96.4% White, 0.0% Black or African American, 0.0% Native American, 0.0% Asian, 0.0% Pacific Islander, 0.0% from other races and 3.6% from two or more races. Hispanic or Latino persons of any race comprised 3.6% of the population.

Of the 44 households, 31.8% of which had children under the age of 18 living with them, 36.4% were married couples living together, 13.6% were cohabitating couples, 29.5% had a female householder with no spouse or partner present and 20.5% had a male householder with no spouse or partner present. 36.4% of all households were non-families. 31.8% of all households were made up of individuals, 9.1% had someone living alone who was 65 years old or older.

The median age in the city was 43.5 years. 26.4% of the residents were under the age of 20; 2.7% were between the ages of 20 and 24; 21.8% were from 25 and 44; 32.7% were from 45 and 64; and 16.4% were 65 years of age or older. The gender makeup of the city was 38.2% male and 61.8% female.

=== 2010 census ===
As of the census of 2010, there were 112 people, 47 households, and 32 families living in the city. The population density was 294.7 inhabitants per square mile (113.8/km^{2}). There were 55 housing units at an average density of 144.7 per square mile (55.9/km^{2}). The racial makeup of the city was 99.1% White and 0.9% African American.

There were 47 households, of which 34.0% had children under the age of 18 living with them, 48.9% were married couples living together, 10.6% had a female householder with no husband present, 8.5% had a male householder with no wife present, and 31.9% were non-families. 29.8% of all households were made up of individuals, and 10.7% had someone living alone who was 65 years of age or older. The average household size was 2.38 and the average family size was 2.84.

The median age in the city was 41.8 years. 24.1% of residents were under the age of 18; 6.4% were between the ages of 18 and 24; 27.7% were from 25 to 44; 28.6% were from 45 to 64; and 13.4% were 65 years of age or older. The gender makeup of the city was 50.9% male and 49.1% female.

=== 2000 census ===
As of the census of 2000, there were 126 people, 51 households, and 39 families living in the city. The population density was 333.4 inhabitants per square mile (128.7/km^{2}). There were 60 housing units at an average density of 158.8 per square mile (61.3/km^{2}). The racial makeup of the city was 97.62% White and 2.38% Native American.

There were 51 households, out of which 27.5% had children under the age of 18 living with them, 60.8% were married couples living together, 13.7% had a female householder with no husband present, and 23.5% were non-families. 19.6% of all households were made up of individuals, and 9.8% had someone living alone who was 65 years of age or older. The average household size was 2.47 and the average family size was 2.82.

In the city, the population was spread out, with 23.8% under the age of 18, 8.7% from 18 to 24, 23.0% from 25 to 44, 24.6% from 45 to 64, and 19.8% who were 65 years of age or older. The median age was 42 years. For every 100 females, there were 93.8 males. For every 100 females age 18 and over, there were 88.2 males.

The median income for a household in the city was $35,625, and the median income for a family was $41,250. Males had a median income of $26,250 versus $13,750 for females. The per capita income for the city was $17,807. There were no families and 1.6% of the population living below the poverty line, including no under eighteens and 8.0% of those over 64.

== Education ==
It is in the Pekin Community School District.

== Notable people ==
- Gayno Smith, mass murderer
