= Packwood, Iowa =

- City
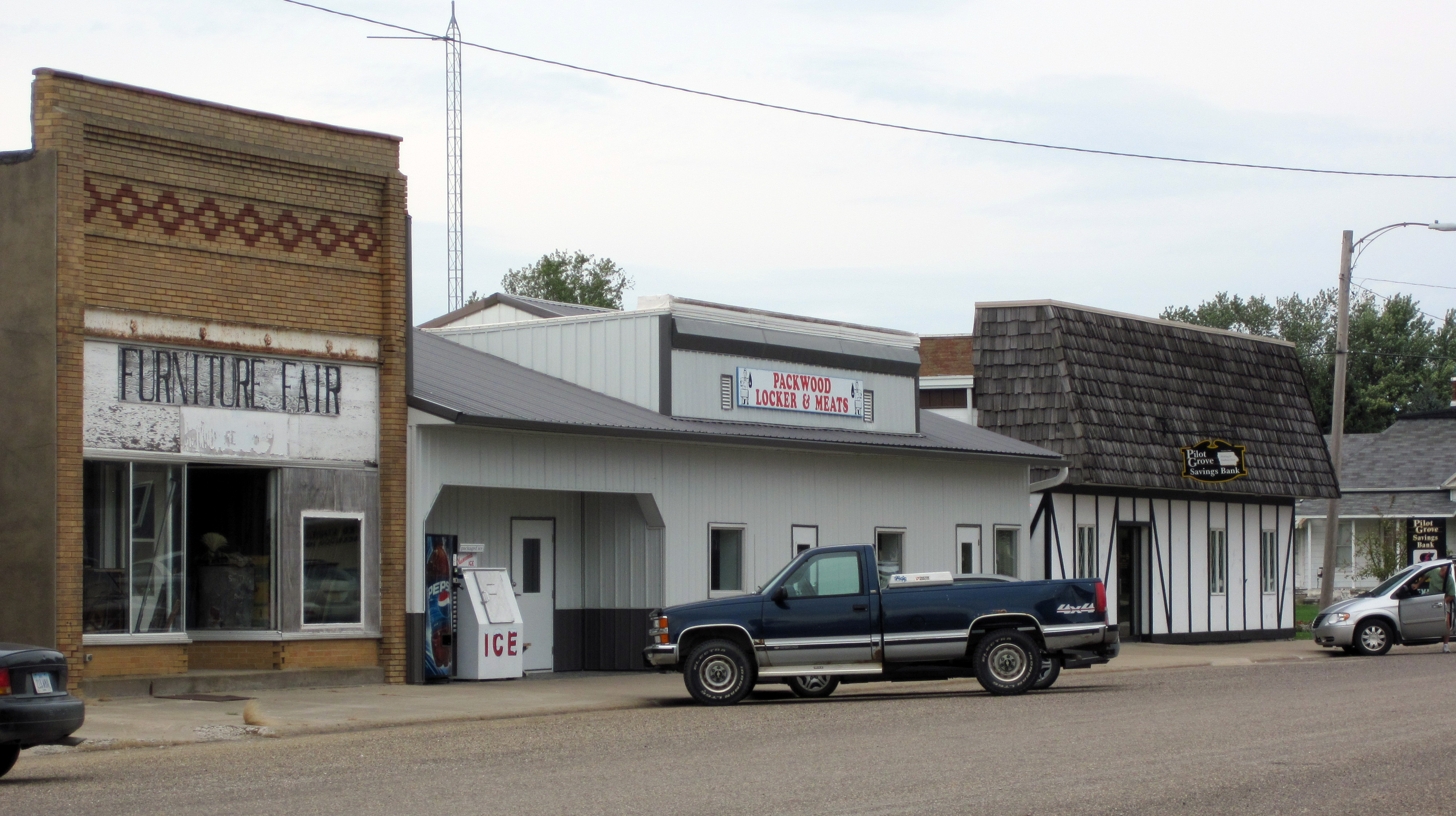

- Location of Packwood, Iowa
- Coordinates: 41°07′58″N 92°04′57″W
- Country: United States
- State: Iowa
- County: Jefferson

Area
  - Total: 0.75 sq mi (1.94 km^{2})
  - Land: 0.75 sq mi (1.94 km^{2})
  - Water: 0 sq mi (0.00 km^{2})
- Elevation: 810 ft (250 m)

Population (2020)
  - Total: 183
  - Density: 244.4/sq mi (94.35/km^{2})
- Time zone: UTC-6 (Central (CST))
  - Summer (DST): UTC-5 (CDT)
- ZIP code: 52580
- Area code: 319
- FIPS code: 19-60915
- GNIS feature ID: 2396125

Packwood is a city in Jefferson County, Iowa, United States. The population was 183 at the time of the 2020 census. The Burlington and Western Railway arrived in Packwood in late 1882. This was a narrow gauge line, widened to standard gauge in 1902 and taken over by the Chicago, Burlington and Quincy, and then sold to the Minneapolis and St. Louis in 1934.

== Geography ==
According to the United States Census Bureau, the city has a total area of 0.76 square miles (1.97 km^{2}), all land.

== Demographics ==
Historical populations
Year	Pop.	±%
1900	284	—
1910	264	−7.0%
1920	294	+11.4%
1930	208	−29.3%
1940	256	+23.1%
1950	211	−17.6%
1960	215	+1.9%
1970	157	−27.0%
1980	210	+33.8%
1990	208	−1.0%
2000	223	+7.2%
2010	204	−8.5%
2020	183	−10.3%
Source:"U.S. Census website". United States Census Bureau. and Iowa Data Center; Source: U.S. Decennial Census

=== 2020 census ===
As of the census of 2020, there were 183 people, 89 households, and 53 families residing in the city. The population density was 244.4 inhabitants per square mile (94.4/km^{2}). There were 93 housing units at an average density of 124.2 per square mile (47.9/km^{2}). The racial makeup of the city was 95.6% White, 0.0% Black or African American, 0.0% Native American, 0.0% Asian, 0.0% Pacific Islander, 0.5% from other races and 3.8% from two or more races. Hispanic or Latino persons of any race comprised 0.5% of the population.

Of the 89 households, 33.7% of which had children under the age of 18 living with them, 38.2% were married couples living together, 3.4% were cohabitating couples, 34.8% had a female householder with no spouse or partner present and 23.6% had a male householder with no spouse or partner present. 40.4% of all households were non-families. 36.0% of all households were made up of individuals, 9.0% had someone living alone who was 65 years old or older.

The median age in the city was 46.1 years. 27.3% of the residents were under the age of 20; 3.3% were between the ages of 20 and 24; 18.0% were from 25 and 44; 27.9% were from 45 and 64; and 23.5% were 65 years of age or older. The gender makeup of the city was 47.0% male and 53.0% female.

=== 2010 census ===
As of the census of 2010, there were 204 people, 85 households, and 52 families living in the city. The population density was 268.4 inhabitants per square mile (103.6/km^{2}). There were 96 housing units at an average density of 126.3 per square mile (48.8/km^{2}). The racial makeup of the city was 96.6% White, 1.0% African American, 0.5% Pacific Islander, and 2.0% from two or more races. Hispanic or Latino of any race were 0.5% of the population.

There were 85 households, of which 28.2% had children under the age of 18 living with them, 52.9% were married couples living together, 3.5% had a female householder with no husband present, 4.7% had a male householder with no wife present, and 38.8% were non-families. 30.6% of all households were made up of individuals, and 14.1% had someone living alone who was 65 years of age or older. The average household size was 2.40 and the average family size was 3.04.

The median age in the city was 41.5 years. 30.4% of residents were under the age of 18; 1.6% were between the ages of 18 and 24; 21.6% were from 25 to 44; 30.5% were from 45 to 64; and 16.2% were 65 years of age or older. The gender makeup of the city was 44.1% male and 55.9% female.

=== 2000 census ===
As of the census of 2000, there were 223 people, 101 households, and 65 families living in the city. The population density was 289.9 inhabitants per square mile (111.9/km^{2}). There were 108 housing units at an average density of 140.4 per square mile (54.2/km^{2}). The racial makeup of the city was 98.65% White and 1.35% Native American.

There were 101 households, of which 24.8% had children under the age of 18 living with them, 56.4% were married couples living together, 4.0% had a female householder with no husband present, and 35.6% were non-families. 34.7% of all households were made up of individuals, and 17.8% had someone living alone who was 65 years of age or older. The average household size was 2.21 and the average family size was 2.86.

In the city, the population was spread out, with 23.3% under the age of 18, 5.4% from 18 to 24, 27.8% from 25 to 44, 23.8% from 45 to 64, and 19.7% who were 65 years of age or older. The median age was 40 years. For every 100 females, there were 85.8 males. For every 100 females age 18 and over, there were 85.9 males.

The median income for a household in the city was $32,000, and the median income for a family was $37,321. Males had a median income of $28,438 versus $16,250 for females. The per capita income for the city was $17,081. None of the families and 0.8% of the population were living below the poverty line, including no under eighteens and 3.3% of those over 64.

== Education ==
Packwood is in the Pekin Community School District.
