= Elmina Wilson =

American civil engineer

- 1892 graduation photo
- Born: Elmina Tessa Wilson; September 29, 1870; Harper, Iowa, U.S.
- Died: June 4, 1918 (aged 44); New York City, New York, U.S.
- Other name: Elmina T. Wilson
- Occupation: civil engineer
- Known for: First woman to earn a four-year degree and a master's degree in civil engineering in the U.S.

Elmina Wilson (1870–1918) was the first American woman to complete a four-year degree in civil engineering. She went on to earn the first master's degree in the field and then became the first woman professor to teach engineering at Iowa State University (ISU). Her first project was as an assistant on the design of the Marston Water Tower on the ISU campus. After teaching for a decade at the school, she moved to New York City to enter private practice. Wilson worked with the James E. Brooks Company, skyscraper design firm Purdy and Henderson, and the John Severn Brown Company.

== Early life ==
Elmina Tessa Wilson was born on 29 September 1870 in Harper, Keokuk County, Iowa to Olive (née Eaton) and John C. Wilson. She was the second-to-the-youngest daughter in a family of five other siblings, Warren, Fanny, Olive, Anna, and Alda. In 1892, she graduated from Iowa State University (ISU) with the first four-year civil engineering degree awarded any woman from an American university. In 1894, Elmina graduated with a master's degree in civil engineering from ISU, simultaneously with sister Alda's graduation with a bachelor's in the same field. Both sisters were members of Pi Beta Phi women's fraternity and staunch supporters of both women's education and suffrage.

== Career ==
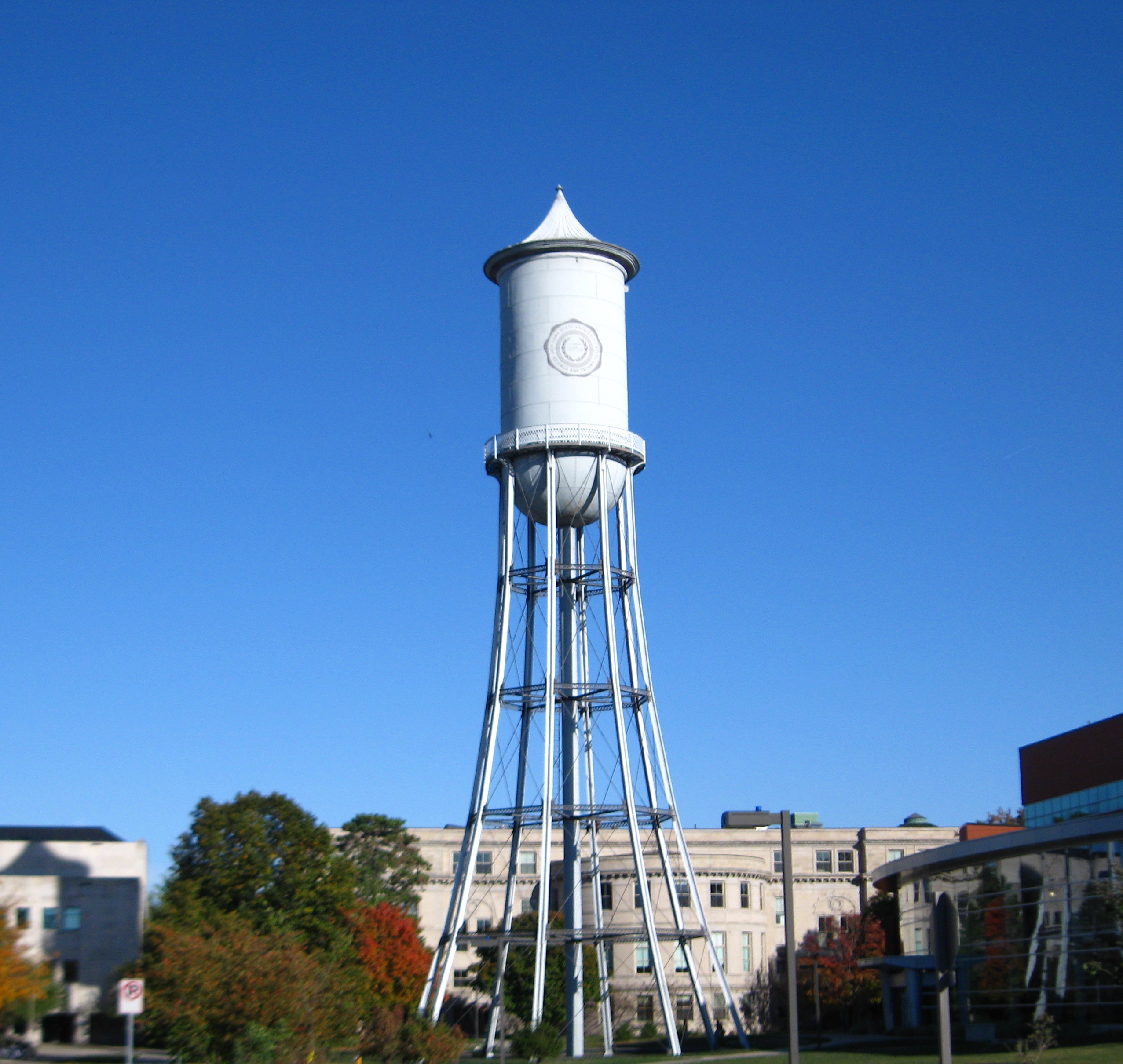
Marston water tower, designed in 1895 by Anson Marston and Elmina Wilson

Soon after her graduation, Wilson began working at ISU, first as an assistant in the school's drafting room and then was promoted as an instructor the following year. In 1895, she collaborated on a project with a professor, Anson Marston, which was the first elevated steel water tower to be constructed west of the Mississippi. The tower, which became known as the Marston Water Tower, was completed in 1897. After finishing the project, Wilson took a winter course in hydraulics at Cornell University and returned to teaching physics at ISU. During her summer breaks, she worked with Alda in Chicago with the firm of Patton & Miller, doing drafting work and for the next two winter breaks, she studied at Massachusetts Institute of Technology earning a graduate degree. She returned to work at ISU as an assistant professor of physics and began publishing several articles in the Iowa Engineer about testing cement formulas. Most of the courses she taught focused on civil engineering and dealt with structures.

In the fall of 1903, Wilson and her sister Alda took a sabbatical to study engineering and architectural designs in Europe. Traveling mostly on bicycles, they visited England, France, Germany, Greece, Italy, Scotland and Switzerland. Upon their return to the states in 1904, Wilson resigned from her post at ISU and sought private employment in New York City with the James E. Brooks Company. Her first assignment with the firm was at the Essex Structural Steel Works in Bloomfield, New Jersey. In 1906, she began working on publications with the U.S. Department of Agriculture and a brochure entitled Modern Conveniences for the Farm Home was serialized in several newspapers nationally. Articles included topics such as piping water pumped by a windmill throughout rural homes or adding bathtubs serviced by water pumped from elevated tanks in an attic or pneumatic cylinders installed in basements,

The following year, Wilson joined the prestigious engineering firm of Purdy and Henderson, leaders in skyscraper design, where she began work on the Flatiron Building and later worked on the Met Life Tower. In December 1907, the sisters sailed aboard the White Star Line's ship Adriatic, returning to Europe to spend six months studying architecture in France and Spain. Returning home, they worked together on the design of a residence in Ames, Iowa for W. J. Freed and his daughter Kittie. In 1911, Wilson served as president of the New York Chapter of the Pi Beta Phi Alumni Club. Then she was hired as a structural designer in 1912 by the John Severn Brown Company. In 1913, the sisters planned another trip, to study for eight months in Germany, Italy, and Sicily.

In 1915, the sisters jointly worked on architectural and engineering drawings for the Teachers Cottage, also known as Helmich House, in Gatlinburg, Tennessee at the Arrowmont School of Arts and Crafts. Wilson applied for membership along with Nora Blatch in the American Society of Civil Engineers (ASCE), but was rejected. Blatch later sued the organization to attain membership. The sisters were involved with the Manhattan Woman's Suffrage Club, for which Elmina served as president, coming in contact with national leaders like Susan B. Anthony, Carrie Chapman Catt and Eleanor Roosevelt. Due to their Iowa ties and suffrage involvement, the Wilson sisters became personal friends with Catt, for whom Alda would later become a companion and secretary.

Wilson died on June 4, 1918, in New York City and was buried there.

== Projects ==
Design of the Marston Water Tower began in 1895 when a drought caused a severe water shortage. The project lead was Anson Marston, dean of the engineering department at Iowa State University, with Wilson assisting. The design of the 40-foot-tall (12-meter) and 24-foot-diameter (7.3-meter) water tower, included eight columns, rather than the standard four, to safely support the 162,000-gallon structure. It was also the first steel, rather than wood, elevated tower west of the Mississippi River. The tower was listed on the National Register of Historic Places in 1981, three years after it was decommissioned as the water reservoir and pressure regulation system for the campus water supply.

In 1909, Wilson and her sister Alda designed a residence for W. J. Freed and his daughter Kittie. The house was a six-room cottage located on Story Street (Today 5th Street) in Ames, Iowa.

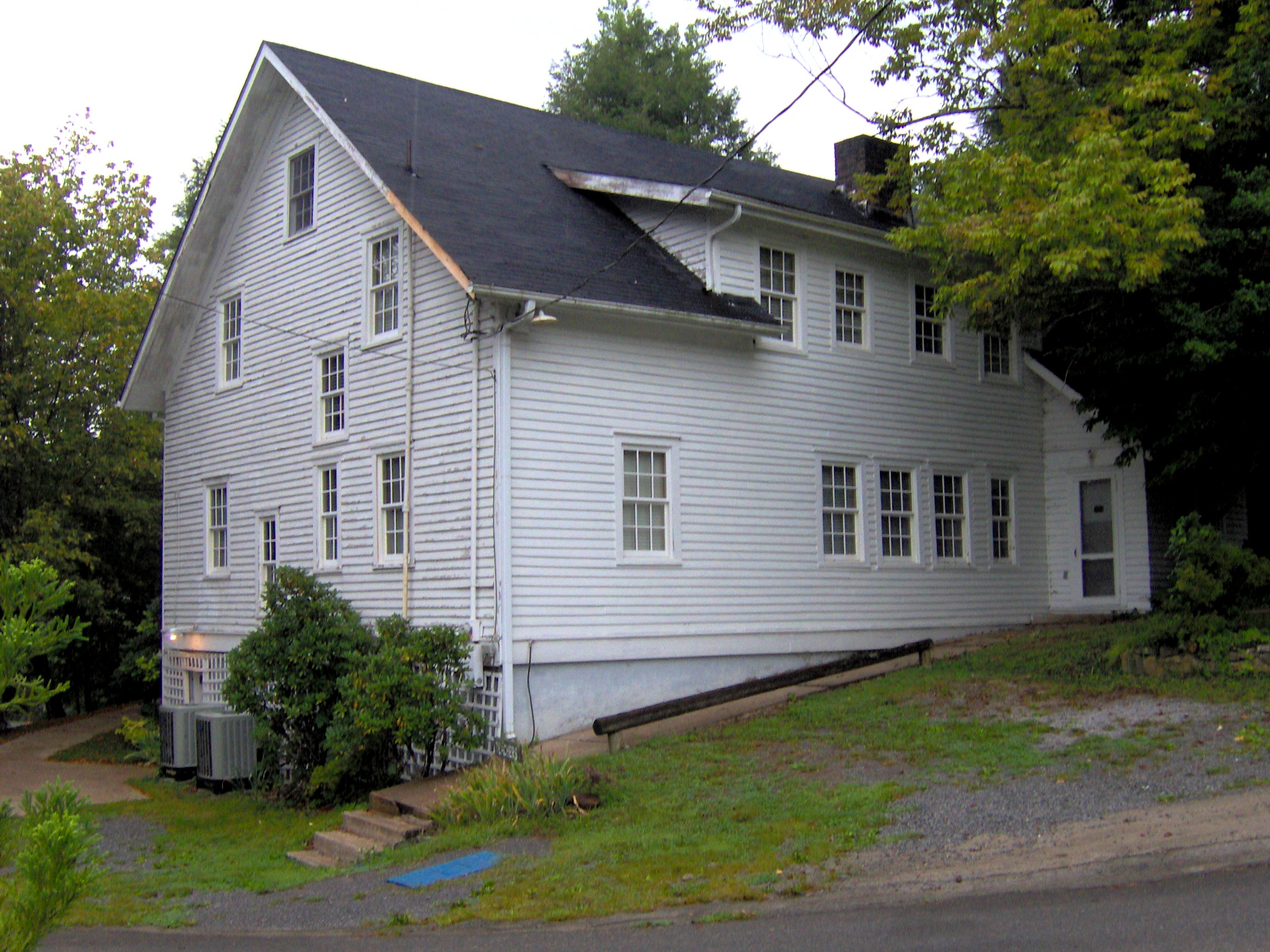
Helmich House, Arrowmont School

Helmich House was designed in 1915 and was the first known architect-designed dwelling in Gatlinburg, Tennessee. It was part of the campus of Arrowmont School, a project promoted by Phi Beta Phi as a settlement house-type program based on the model of the agricultural schools in vogue in the Progressive Era. The ten-room residence was a 1 1/2-story frame bungalow on a concrete foundation. Built in 1916, the residence, which was constructed to provide living quarters for the teachers being recruited to work in the school, had modern amenities including the first furnace in Gatlinburg and running water. The exterior was clad with weatherboard siding featuring shed dormers on the north and rear façades, covered by a side-gabled, asphalt-shingled roof. In 2007, the teacher's residence was placed on the National Register of Historic Places as part of the Settlement School Community Outreach Historic District of Sevier County, Tennessee.
