= Alda Heaton Wilson =

American architect (1873–1960)

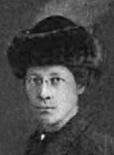
- 1912
- Born: September 20, 1873; Harper, Keokuk County, Iowa
- Died: July 25, 1960 (aged 86); Chicago, Cook County, Illinois
- Other name: Alda Heston Wilson
- Occupation: architect
- Known for: Secretary to and executor of the estate of Carrie Chapman Catt

Alda Heaton Wilson (1873–1960) was an architect and civil engineer from Iowa. She and her sister Elmina were the first American women to practice civil engineering after obtaining a four-year degree. She worked as a freelance architect in Illinois, Iowa and Missouri before moving to New York and working there for over a decade. She was the first woman supervisor of the women's drafting department of the Iowa Highway Commission. In her later career, she curtailed her architectural works, becoming the secretary, housemate and traveling companion of Carrie Chapman Catt.

== Early life ==
Alda Heaton Wilson was born on 20 September 1873 in Harper, Keokuk County, Iowa to Olive (née Eaton) and John C. Wilson. She was the youngest daughter in a family of five other siblings, Warren, Fanny, Olive, Anna, and Elmina. In 1894, Alda graduated with a bachelor's degree in civil engineering from Iowa State University (ISU), simultaneously with Elmina's graduation with a master's degree in the same field. Both sisters were members of Pi Beta Phi women's fraternity and staunch supporters of both women's education and suffrage.

== Career ==
Between 1895 and 1897, Alda worked for several architectural firms in Chicago. She then pursued graduate studies at Massachusetts Institute of Technology between 1897 and 1898, returning thereafter to work in Chicago, with various design firms and later in Kansas City and Ames, Iowa until 1903. One of the firms Alda worked at was Patton & Miller, known for building Carnegie libraries throughout the U.S. That year, she and her sister Elmina took a sabbatical to study engineering and architectural designs in Europe. Upon their return to the states in 1904, Alma worked as a freelance architect for several prominent firms in New York City. Then in 1908, the sisters returned to Europe, spending six months studying architecture in Spain and France. In 1913, they planned another trip, to study for eight months in Germany, Italy and Sicily. In 1915, the sisters jointly worked on architectural and engineering drawings for the Teachers Cottage, also known as Helmich House, in Gatlinburg, Tennessee at the Arrowmont School of Arts and Crafts. They were also involved with the Manhattan Woman's Suffrage Club, for which Elmina served as president, coming in contact with national leaders like Susan B. Anthony, Carrie Chapman Catt and Eleanor Roosevelt. Due to their Iowa ties and suffrage involvement, the Wilson sisters became personal friends with Catt.

In 1918, Elmira died and Alda returned to Iowa, where she began working as head of the women's drafting department of the Iowa Highway Commission in 1919. The department was created because the Highway Department had trouble finding qualified men after World War I, and devised a unit of women drafters to fill the void. During this time, she also continued with freelancing designs. Alda left the Commission in 1921 and increasingly spent more time traveling with Catt, curtailing her own architectural work. In 1928, after Catt's companion, Mary "Molly" Garrett Hay died, Wilson moved in with Catt to help her, and eventually became a permanent housemate as well as Catt's secretary. After Catt's death, Wilson, who served as Catt's executor donated six albums that as Catt's secretary she had compiled of photographs and materials on international suffrage to Bryn Mawr College and another set of her archives to the Library of Congress.

Wilson died 25 July 1960 in Chicago, Cook County, Illinois.

== Projects ==
In 1909, Alda and Elmina worked together on the design of a residence for W.J. Freed and his daughter Kittie. The house was a six-room cottage located on Story Street (renamed 5th Street in 1910) in Ames, Iowa. W. J. was a pioneer farmer in Story County and Kittie was the librarian at the Ames Public Library and a fellow ISU alumnus.

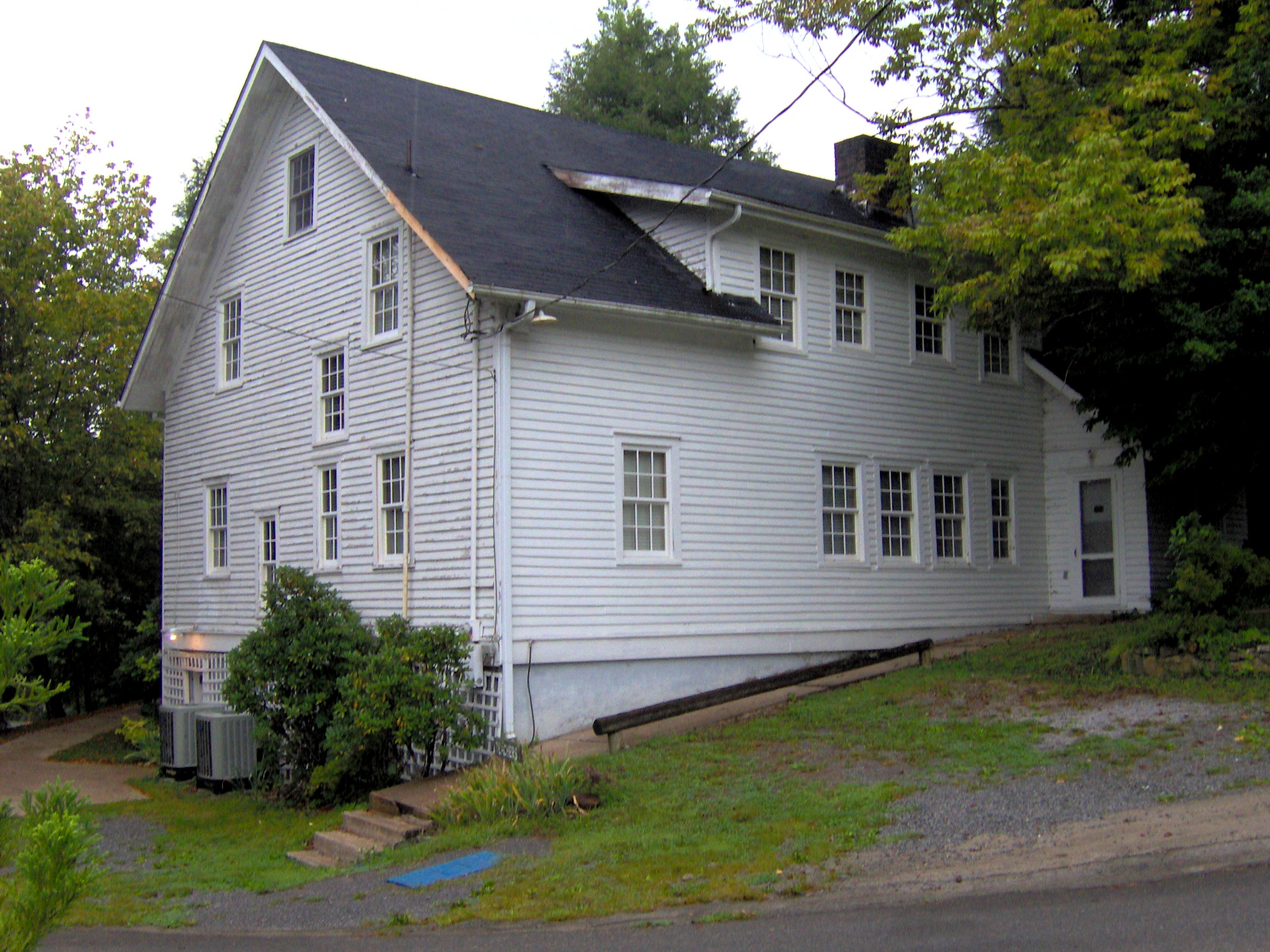
Helmich House, Arrowmont School

Helmich House was designed in 1915 and was the first known architect-designed dwelling in Gatlinburg, Tennessee. It was part of the campus of Arrowmont School, a project promoted by Phi Beta Phi as a settlement house-type program based on the model of the agricultural schools in vogue in the Progressive Era. The 10-room residence was a 1 1/2-story frame bungalow on a concrete foundation. Built in 1916, the residence, which was constructed to provide living quarters for the teachers being recruited to work in the school, had modern amenities including the first furnace in Gatlinburg and running water. The exterior was clad with weatherboard siding featuring shed dormers on the north and rear façades, covered by a side-gabled, asphalt-shingled roof. In 2007, the teacher's residence was placed on the National Register of Historic Places as part of the Settlement School Community Outreach Historic District of Sevier County, Tennessee.
