= Lydia Kear Whaley =

American basket weaver (1840–1926)

- Born: May 24, 1840; Sevier County, Tennessee
- Died: December 4, 1926 (aged 86); Gatlinburg, Tennessee
- Known for: basket weaving

Aunt Lydia basket

Lydia Kear Whaley (1840–1926) was an American basket weaver. While her primary income was farming, the Civil War widow also worked as a healer, midwife, teacher and undertaker. She was a talented basket weaver and the namesake of the Aunt Lydia basket.

== Biography ==
Whaley née Kear was born on May 24, 1840, in Sevier County, Tennessee. In 1860, she married John Whaley, with whom she had three children, two survived infancies. John Whaley died in 1864, while fighting for the Union army in the American Civil War. Whaley supported her family by farming. She also worked as a basket weaver, midwife and healer.

Whaley is known for her basket weaving. The Aunt Lydia basket is created from willow bark, with a large handle. At the age of 70, Whaley taught the craft at the Pi Beta Phi settlement house, now the Arrowmont School of Arts and Crafts.

She died on December 4, 1926, in Gatlinburg, Tennessee.

In 2020 Whaley was included in the exhibition Crafted Roots: Stories and Objects from the Appalachian Mountains at the Center for Craft in Asheville, North Carolina.
