= Rachel Nicol (physician) =

American physician and cofounder of a Women's Fraternity

Doctor Rachel Jane Nicol
- Born: 1845; Edgington, Illinois, US
- Died: 1881 (aged 35–36); Zurich, Switzerland
- Resting place: Cedar Creek Presbyterian Church near Little York, Illinois
- Other name: Rachel "Jennie" Nicol
- Education: Monmouth College, B.A., Woman's Medical College of Pennsylvania, M.D.
- Occupation: Physician
- Known for: Cofounder of the first national (American) women’s fraternity (aka sorority)

Rachel Jane "Jennie" Nicol (1845–1881) was a founder of Pi Beta Phi and a medical doctor. In 1867, she cofounded I.C. Sorosis at Monmouth College in Illinois, the first secret collegiate society for women patterned after men's fraternities, which later adopted the Greek name Pi Beta Phi (ΠΒΦ).

Pi Beta Phi is now an international organization with over 300,000 members. At a time when there were only a few hundred women physicians in the United States she received her M.D. degree in 1879.

== Early life ==
She was the second child, and the only daughter, among four children born to a Presbyterian farming couple from Ohio who emigrated to Edgington, Illinois (where she was born) and later moved to the village of Little York, Illinois.

Her father died in 1861. Her older brother, Drennan, drowned in the Mississippi river and her youngest brother David died in Tennessee on August 20, 1864, in the American Civil War. Her brother William would survive into old age.

== Education ==
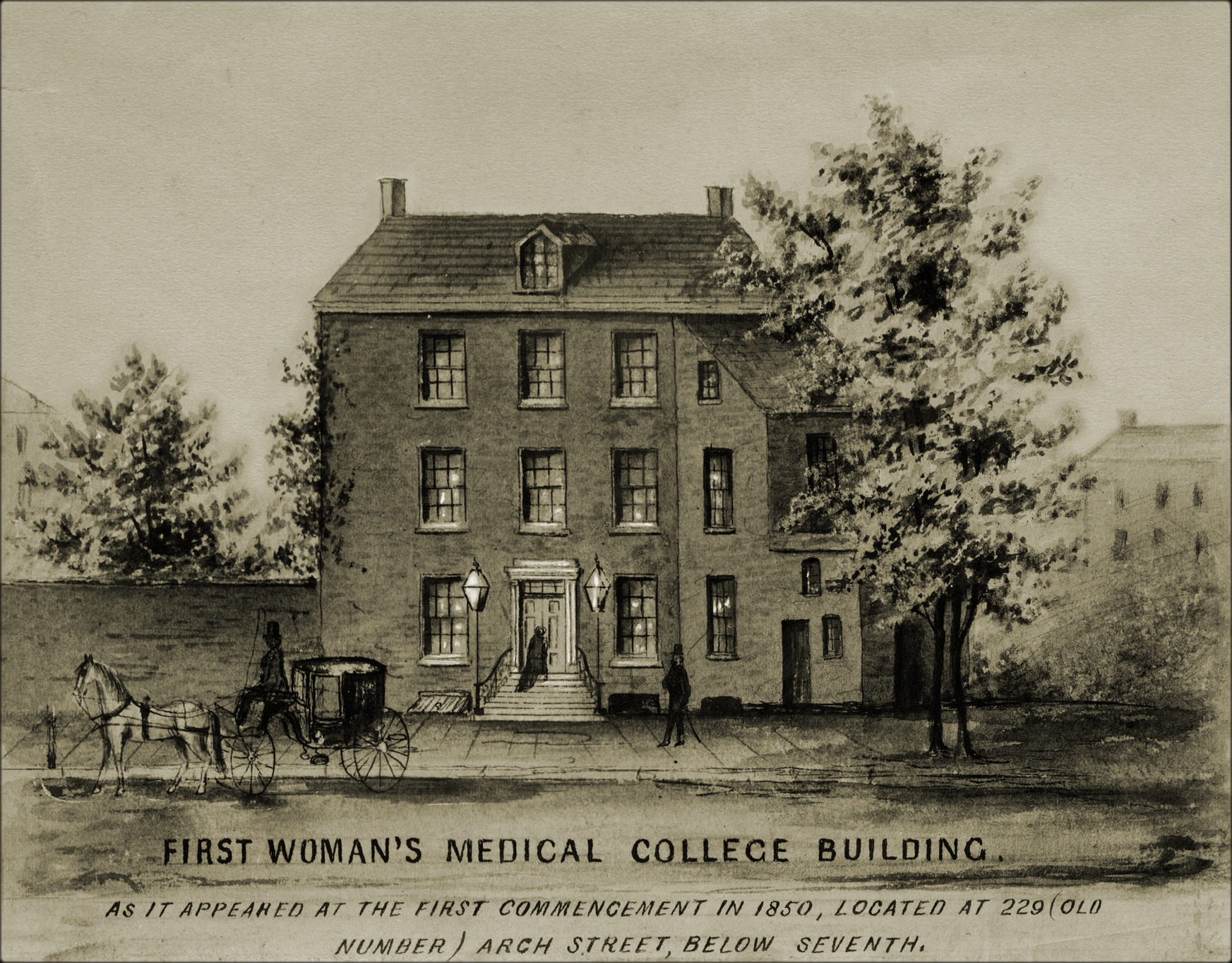
First Female Medical College of Pennsylvania Building as it appeared in 1850

In 1864 Nicol enrolled in the Scientific Program at Monmouth College (Illinois) graduating in 1868. In her Junior year (third year) she cofounded the first women's fraternity I.C. Sorosis, later to become Pi Beta Phi. She was the first initiate of the new organization and was considered by the other founders to be a cofounder; she is listed as such in Pi Beta Phi history.

She continued her education at Woman's Medical College of Pennsylvania and graduated with an M.D. degree in 1879. She then interned for a year at New England Hospital for Women and Children in Boston.

== Career and Death ==
In 1880, she sailed to Switzerland via Holland and Germany where she enrolled in the University of Zurich, and "attended two lectures daily and the remainder of the time devoting to the clinics and the hospitals; am also having practice work in the pathological laboratory…" There she died an untimely death three months later from meningitis following a bout of pneumonia.

== Burial ==
Her body was shipped (via rail and ship) to her family home in Little York where she was buried in the churchyard of Cedar Creek Presbyterian Church.

== Memorial ==
In her honor, Pi Beta Phi, the sorority she helped found, built and supplied the Jennie Nicol Memorial Health Center that operated in Gatlinburg, Tennessee, from 1922 until 1965.
