= Phil Slattery =

American baseball player (1893–1968)

- Pitcher
- Born: February 25, 1893; Harper, Iowa
- Died: March 2, 1968 (aged 75); Long Beach, California
- Batted: Right Threw: Left

MLB debut
- September 16, 1915, for the Pittsburgh Pirates

Last MLB appearance
- September 25, 1915, for the Pittsburgh Pirates

MLB statistics
- Win–loss record: 0–0
- Earned run average: 0.00
- Strikeouts: 1
- Stats at Baseball Reference

Teams
- Pittsburgh Pirates (1915)

Philip Ryan Slattery (February 25, 1893 – March 2, 1968) was a pitcher in Major League Baseball. He played for the Pittsburgh Pirates in 1915.
