= Saints Peter and Paul Roman Catholic Church Historic District =

Historic district in Iowa, United States

- U.S. National Register of Historic Places
- U.S. Historic district
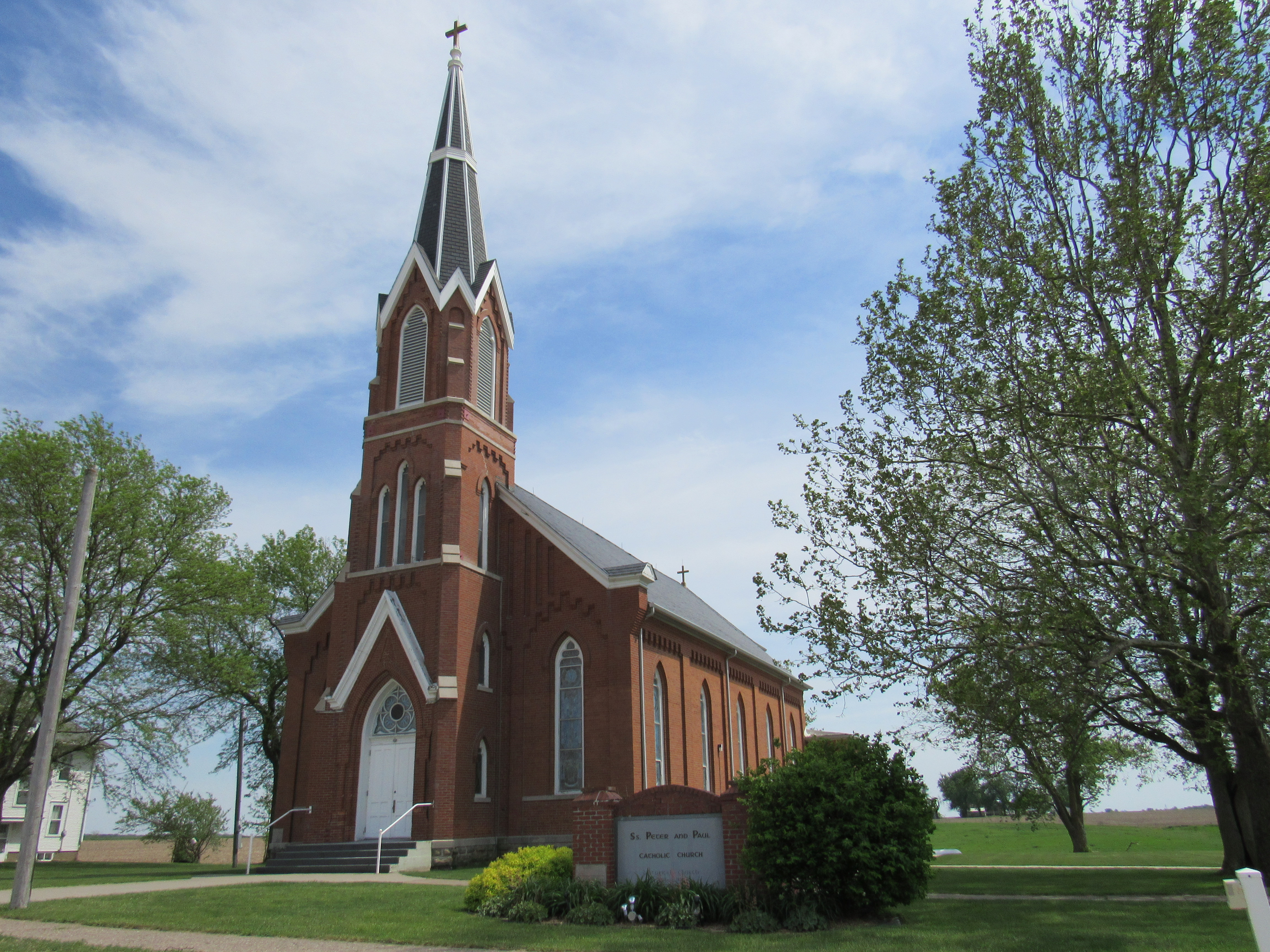

- Location within Iowa Location within the United States
- Location: 30748-30832 242nd St.
- Nearest city: Harper, Iowa
- Coordinates: 41°18′19.26″N 92°0′21.41″W
- Area: less than one acre
- Built: 1898-1899
- Architect: Ferdinand S. Borgolte
- Architectural style: Gothic Revival
- NRHP reference No.: 86002277

Significant dates
- Added to NRHP: August 6, 1986
- Boundary increase: February 25, 2021

Saints Peter and Paul Roman Catholic Church is a former parish church of the Diocese of Davenport. The church is located southeast of Harper, Iowa, United States, in Clear Creek Township, Keokuk County. The church building was individually listed on the National Register of Historic Places in 1986. The parish property was listed as a historic district in 2021. The parish was known in the Davenport Diocese as Saints Peter and Paul, Clear Creek.

== History ==
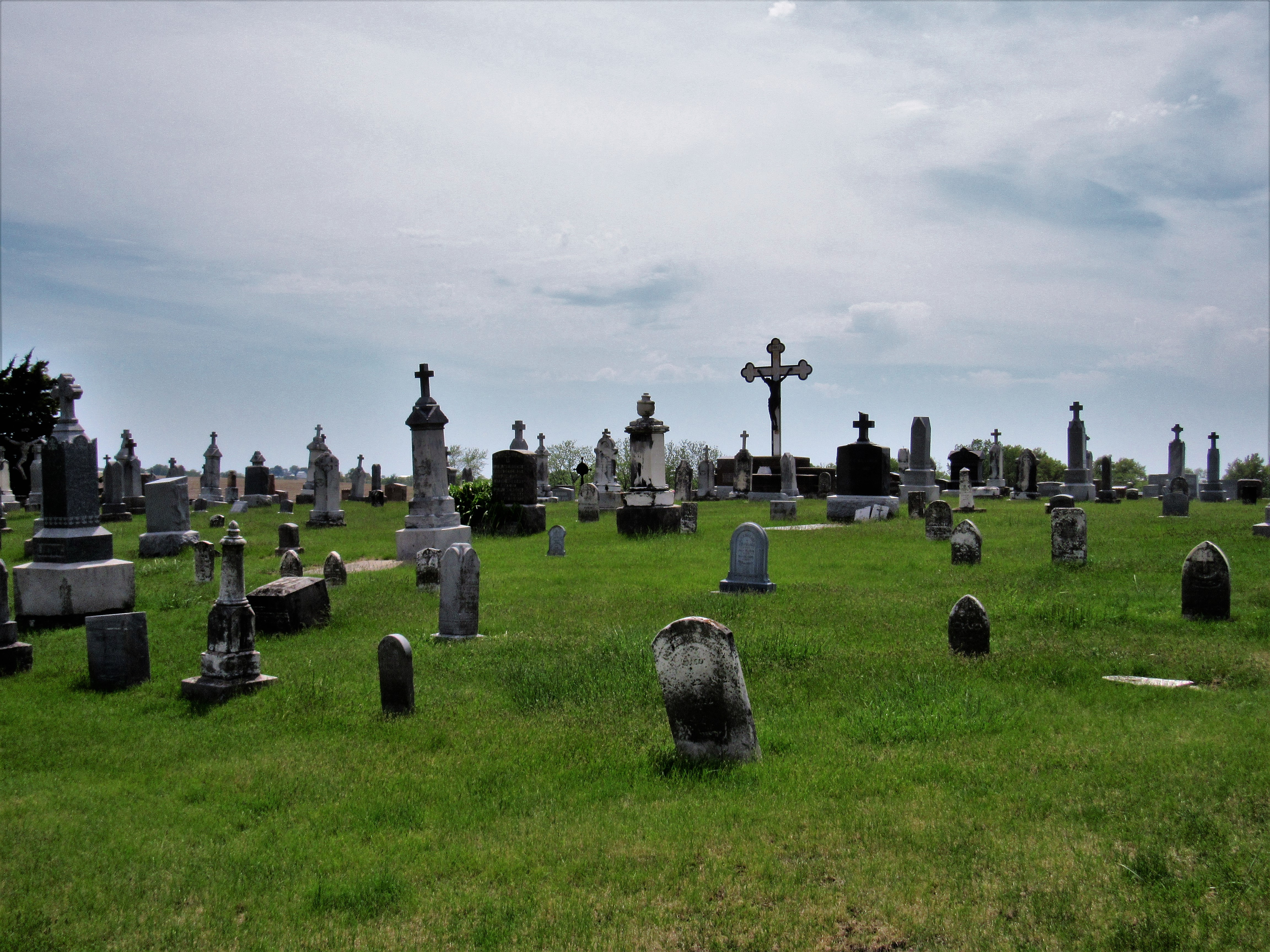
The cemetery west of the church.

German immigrants were some of the first people to settle Keokuk County. They were largely centered in Clear Creek and German Townships and their population, as well as that of the county itself, peaked in 1895. Because they remained independents they were a political force in the county and decided many county elections. Both townships founded Catholic parishes in the 1850s.

Catholics in Clear Creek Township purchased 20 acres (8.1 ha) of land in 1857 for a Catholic church and cemetery. The parish was served by itinerant priests who would visit occasionally. The first Mass was celebrated in the log structure on the property in 1859, and the parish was organized in 1860. The parish started its first church building built of brick in 1863, which was dedicated to the apostles Peter and Paul. The old log church was used for a school until 1875 when the first school building was erected. A rectory was built between 1893 and 1894 for a resident priest.

The Sisters of St. Francis of Assisi from Milwaukee taught in the parish school from 1895-1902. During this time plans for the current church structure were made. Ferdinand S. Borgolte from Rock Island, Illinois was chosen as the architect, and Harry Schroeder of Washington, Iowa as the contractor. the Hammes family also played a role in the construction, The bricks were produced by Fuller & Schumacher of Muscatine, Iowa. The cornerstone was laid on June 8, 1898, by Bishop Henry Cosgrove of Davenport. The church building was dedicated on April 18, 1899, and was built for about $10,000.

In 1902 the Sisters of the Most Precious Blood taught in the school for a few months before lay teachers took over. The following year the School Sisters of St. Francis from Milwaukee came to teach in the school. A new school building with living quarters for the sisters was built in 1906. A new rectory was built in 1911. It was destroyed by a fire in 1930 when the present structure was built.

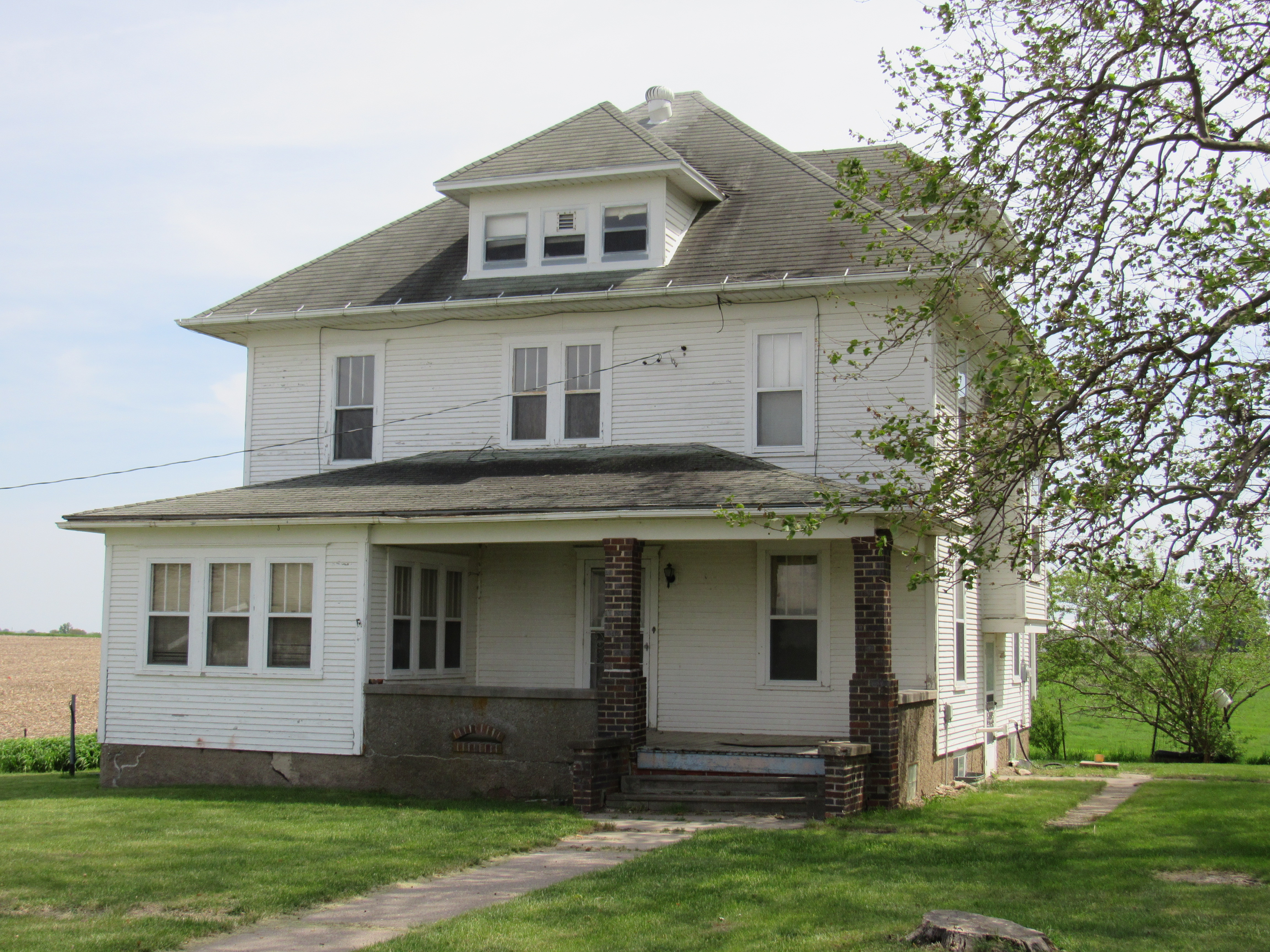
Rectory

Two of the three bells were placed in the tower in 1907. The larger of the two bells weighs 2,060 pounds (930 kg) and cost $566. The smaller bell weighs 1,100 pounds (500 kg) and cost $290. The German language was used until World War I for sermons and church services, when Latin was not used. Anti-German sentiment brought its use to an end. The cemetery's decorative fence was added in 1919 as a thanksgiving offering for the survival of all eighteen of the parish's servicemen in World War I and the lack of any deaths in the 1918 flu pandemic. The parish was one of fourteen in the Ottumwa Deanery that formed the Notre Dame Catholic Youth Organization in 1948. It provided social and other contacts for youth in the area. Lightning struck the church's bell tower in 1950 and set it on fire. The damage was minimal. In 1963 a parish hall was created in the basement of the church.

The parish school had 48 students in the 1966-67 school year. Because of the small number the sisters withdrew from the parish and the school closed. Ten years later the parish voted to join the Keota-Harper Catholic School System. During the pastorate of the Rev. John Hebenstreit (1969-1979) the parish council was established. He ended up being the parish's last resident pastor. Saints Peter and Paul began to share a pastor, the Rev. Robert McAleer, with St. Elizabeth's in the town of Harper. In 1983 the school building was torn down.

St. Mary's parish in Keota was added to the parish cluster when the Rev. H. Robert Harness was the pastor in 1988. The three parishes were officially dissolved on July 1, 1992, when they formed Holy Trinity parish. All three church buildings were initially used by the parish. As the number of Catholics in the area and the number of priests to serve the diocese continued to decline, the decision was made to cluster Holy Trinity parish with St. Mary's parish in Sigourney. At the same time, it was decided to close Saints Peter and Paul Church. The last regularly scheduled Mass in the church was celebrated on June 25, 2006, by the Rev. Marty Goetz who had been the pastor since 2001. On June 13, 2009, Bishop Martin Amos approved the sale of the church building to the Clear Creek Heritage Association.

== Architecture ==
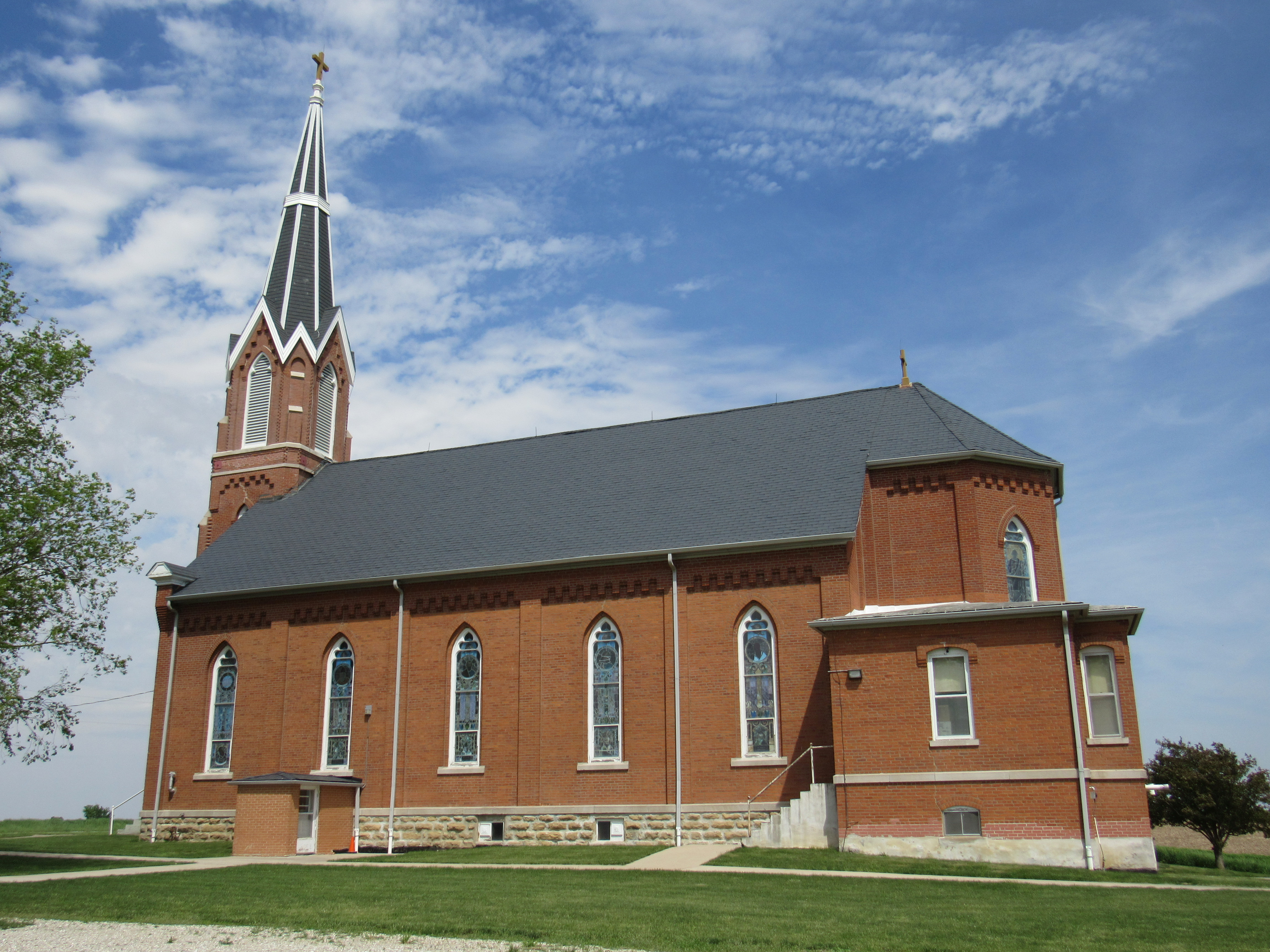
View of the church from the west.

Saints Peter and Paul Church is a 42-by-76-foot (13 by 23 m) structure. The building is Victorian Gothic in style and constructed in two-tone orange brick laid in a common bond. The upper portion of the exterior walls are a darker shade than the lower portion because there was an insufficient amount of brick fired originally. The foundation is locally quarried rock-faced stone. There is a central entrance tower, which rises 150 feet (46 m), and was the tallest structure in Keokuk County when it was built. The exterior features decorative brickwork pilasters and a mock cornice with denticulation. Two sacristies are located on either side of the apse. The building contains period stained glass windows and has wood carved altars and pews. The 14 stained glass windows in the nave and the apse were donated by parish families and they portray various saints. Donor's names are inscribed below. The altars are hand carved walnut with gold leaf trim. The work is attributed to Nickolas Juhl of Davenport. Juhl, a German-born Jew, was an accomplished woodcarver who carved the altars for several of Davenport's Catholic churches.

The rectory is a two-story frame structure in the American Foursquare style. The cemetery features an iron fence with a stone base along two of its sides. It was added in 1919 as a thanksgiving following World War I. All 18 servicemen from the parish survived the war and no one in the parish died from the Spanish flu that followed. Many of the grave markers in the cemetery bear inscriptions in German, which reflects the congregation's heritage.
