= Harper, Iowa =

- City
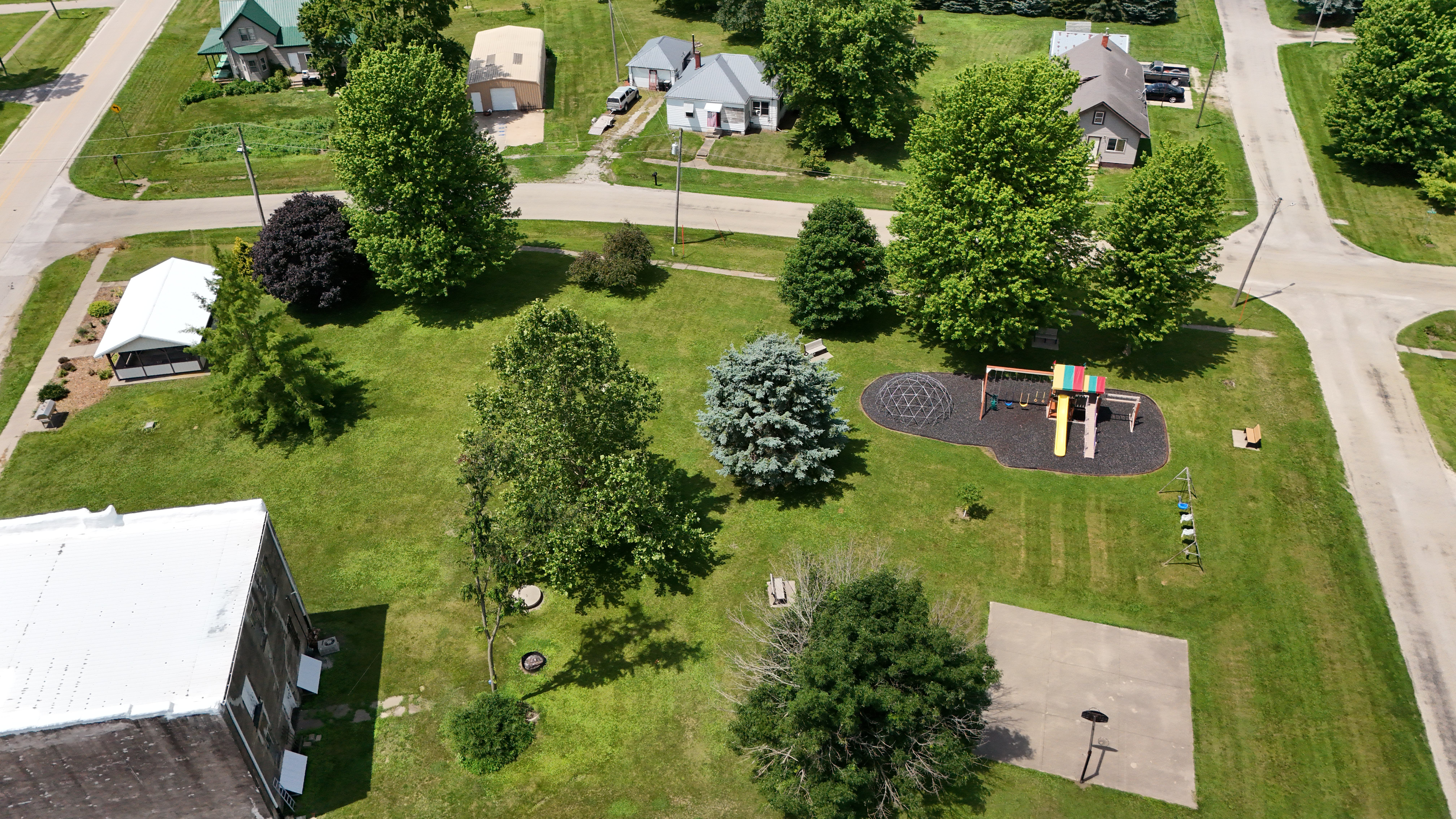
- Harper city park

- Location of Harper, Iowa
- Coordinates: 41°21′49″N 92°03′03″W
- Country: United States
- State: Iowa
- County: Keokuk

Area
  - Total: 0.089 sq mi (0.23 km^{2})
  - Land: 0.089 sq mi (0.23 km^{2})
  - Water: 0 sq mi (0.00 km^{2})
- Elevation: 810 ft (250 m)

Population (2020)
  - Total: 118
  - Density: 1,334.2/sq mi (515.15/km^{2})
- Time zone: UTC-6 (Central (CST))
  - Summer (DST): UTC-5 (CDT)
- ZIP code: 52231
- Area code: 641
- FIPS code: 19-34545
- GNIS feature ID: 2394300

Harper is a city in Keokuk County, Iowa, United States. The population was 118 at the time of the 2020 census.

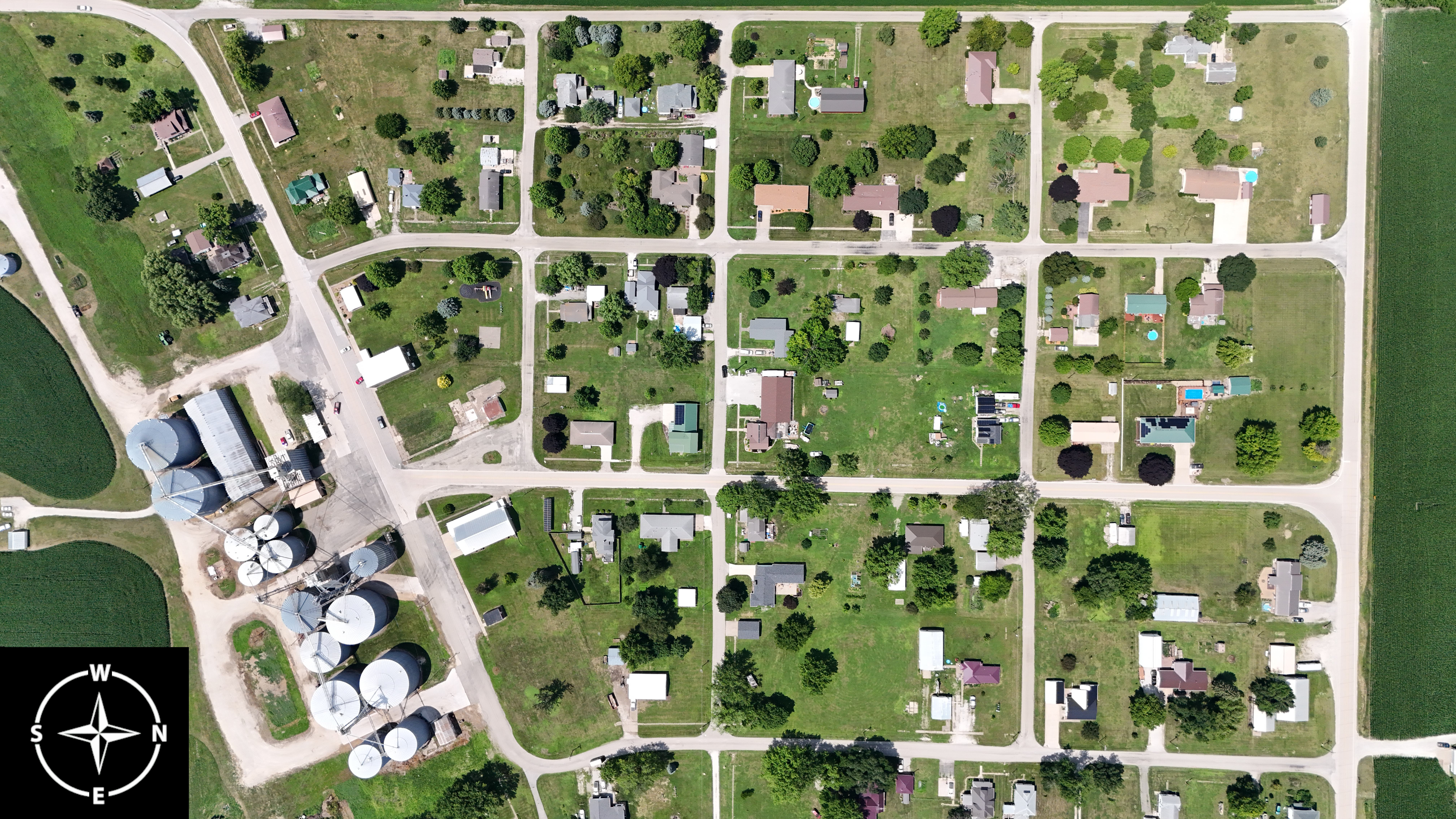
An aerial view of Harper, on July 1, 2025

== Geography ==
According to the United States Census Bureau, the city has a total area of 0.09 square miles (0.23 km^{2}), all of it land.

== Demographics ==
Historical populations
Year	Pop.	±%
1880	254	—
1890	253	−0.4%
1900	269	+6.3%
1910	232	−13.8%
1920	247	+6.5%
1930	212	−14.2%
1940	208	−1.9%
1950	182	−12.5%
1960	177	−2.7%
1970	173	−2.3%
1980	138	−20.2%
1990	147	+6.5%
2000	134	−8.8%
2010	114	−14.9%
2020	118	+3.5%
Source:"U.S. Census website". United States Census Bureau. and Iowa Data Center; Source: U.S. Decennial Census

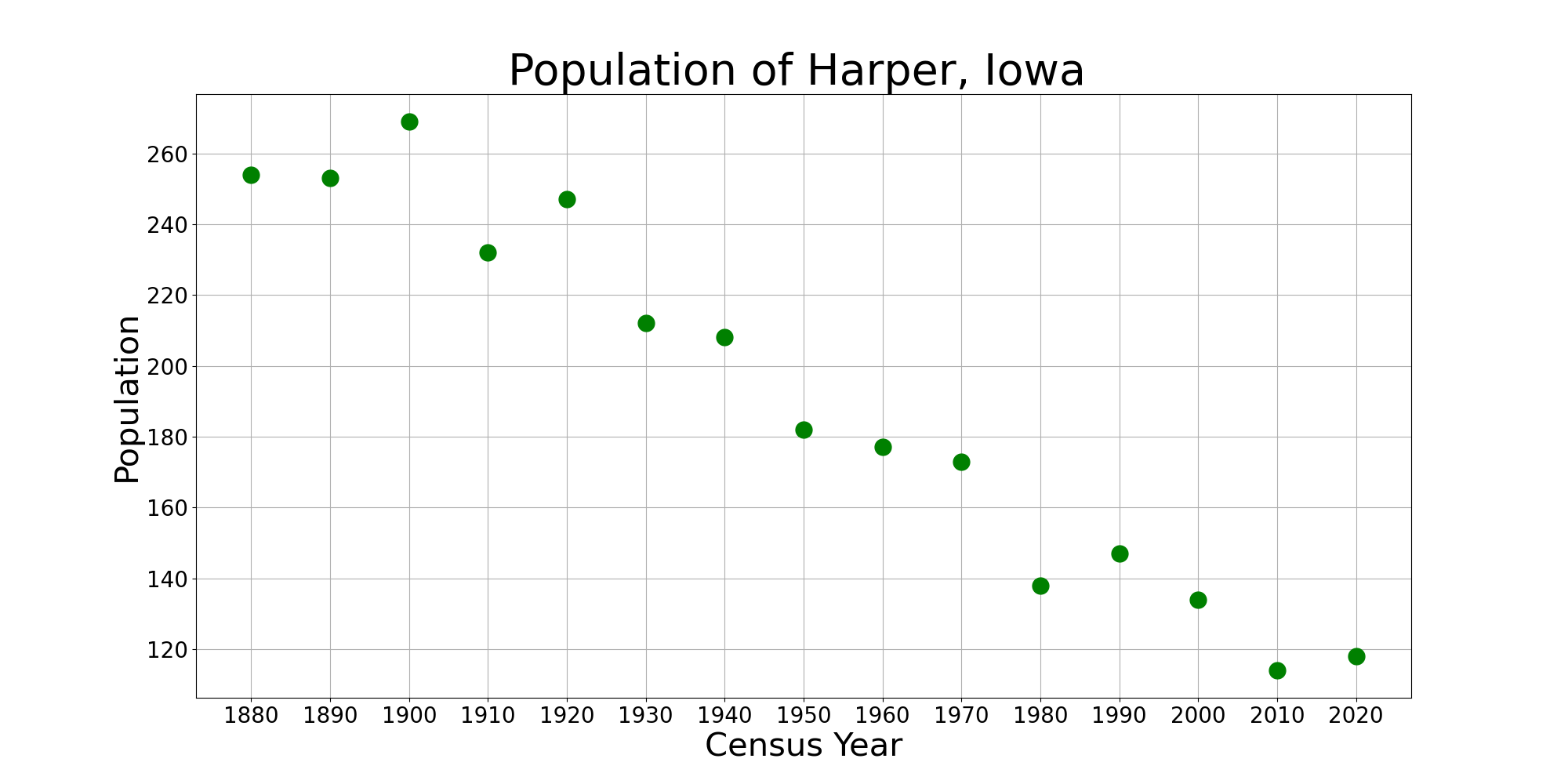
The population of Harper, Iowa from US census data

=== 2020 census ===
As of the census of 2020, there were 118 people, 50 households, and 33 families residing in the city. The population density was 1,334.2 inhabitants per square mile (515.2/km^{2}). There were 50 housing units at an average density of 565.4 per square mile (218.3/km^{2}). The racial makeup of the city was 90.7% White, 0.0% Black or African American, 0.0% Native American, 0.0% Asian, 0.0% Pacific Islander, 1.7% from other races and 7.6% from two or more races. Hispanic or Latino persons of any race comprised 2.5% of the population.

Of the 50 households, 44.0% of which had children under the age of 18 living with them, 52.0% were married couples living together, 12.0% were cohabitating couples, 16.0% had a female householder with no spouse or partner present and 20.0% had a male householder with no spouse or partner present. 34.0% of all households were non-families. 24.0% of all households were made up of individuals, 8.0% had someone living alone who was 65 years old or older.

The median age in the city was 35.0 years. 35.6% of the residents were under the age of 20; 5.9% were between the ages of 20 and 24; 27.1% were from 25 and 44; 17.8% were from 45 and 64; and 13.6% were 65 years of age or older. The gender makeup of the city was 49.2% male and 50.8% female.

=== 2010 census ===
As of the census of 2010, there were 114 people, 49 households, and 28 families living in the city. The population density was 1,266.7 inhabitants per square mile (489.1/km^{2}). There were 56 housing units at an average density of 622.2 per square mile (240.2/km^{2}). The racial makeup of the city was 94.7% White, 0.9% Native American, 1.8% from other races, and 2.6% from two or more races. Hispanic or Latino of any race were 5.3% of the population.

There were 49 households, of which 26.5% had children under the age of 18 living with them, 44.9% were married couples living together, 6.1% had a female householder with no husband present, 6.1% had a male householder with no wife present, and 42.9% were non-families. 36.7% of all households were made up of individuals, and 18.4% had someone living alone who was 65 years of age or older. The average household size was 2.33 and the average family size was 3.07.

The median age in the city was 31.5 years. 26.3% of residents were under the age of 18; 12.3% were between the ages of 18 and 24; 27.2% were from 25 to 44; 17.5% were from 45 to 64; and 16.7% were 65 years of age or older. The gender makeup of the city was 48.2% male and 51.8% female.

=== 2000 census ===
As of the census of 2000, there were 134 people, 55 households, and 40 families living in the city. The population density was 1,523.7 inhabitants per square mile (588.3/km^{2}). There were 61 housing units at an average density of 693.6 per square mile (267.8/km^{2}). The racial makeup of the city was 100.00% White.

There were 55 households, out of which 27.3% had children under the age of 18 living with them, 65.5% were married couples living together, 5.5% had a female householder with no husband present, and 25.5% were non-families. 20.0% of all households were made up of individuals, and 12.7% had someone living alone who was 65 years of age or older. The average household size was 2.44 and the average family size was 2.78.

In the city, the population was spread out, with 23.9% under the age of 18, 3.7% from 18 to 24, 28.4% from 25 to 44, 15.7% from 45 to 64, and 28.4% who were 65 years of age or older. The median age was 40 years. For every 100 females, there were 91.4 males. For every 100 females age 18 and over, there were 100.0 males.

The median income for a household in the city was $37,875, and the median income for a family was $38,594. Males had a median income of $22,083 versus $22,188 for females. The per capita income for the city was $12,620. There were 4.9% of families and 4.5% of the population living below the poverty line, including 3.9% of under eighteens and none of those over 64.

== Education ==
Keota Community School District operates local public schools.

== Arts and culture ==
Landmarks

- The Saints Peter and Paul Roman Catholic Church in Harper is on the National Register of Historic Places.

The Saints Peter and Paul cemetery is the final resting place of eight Hammes children who all died in a tragic car-train accident in October 1956.

== Notable people ==
- Phil Slattery, baseball player.
