= Arrowmont School of Arts and Crafts =

- Settlement School Dormitories and Dwellings Historic District
- U.S. National Register of Historic Places
- U.S. Historic district
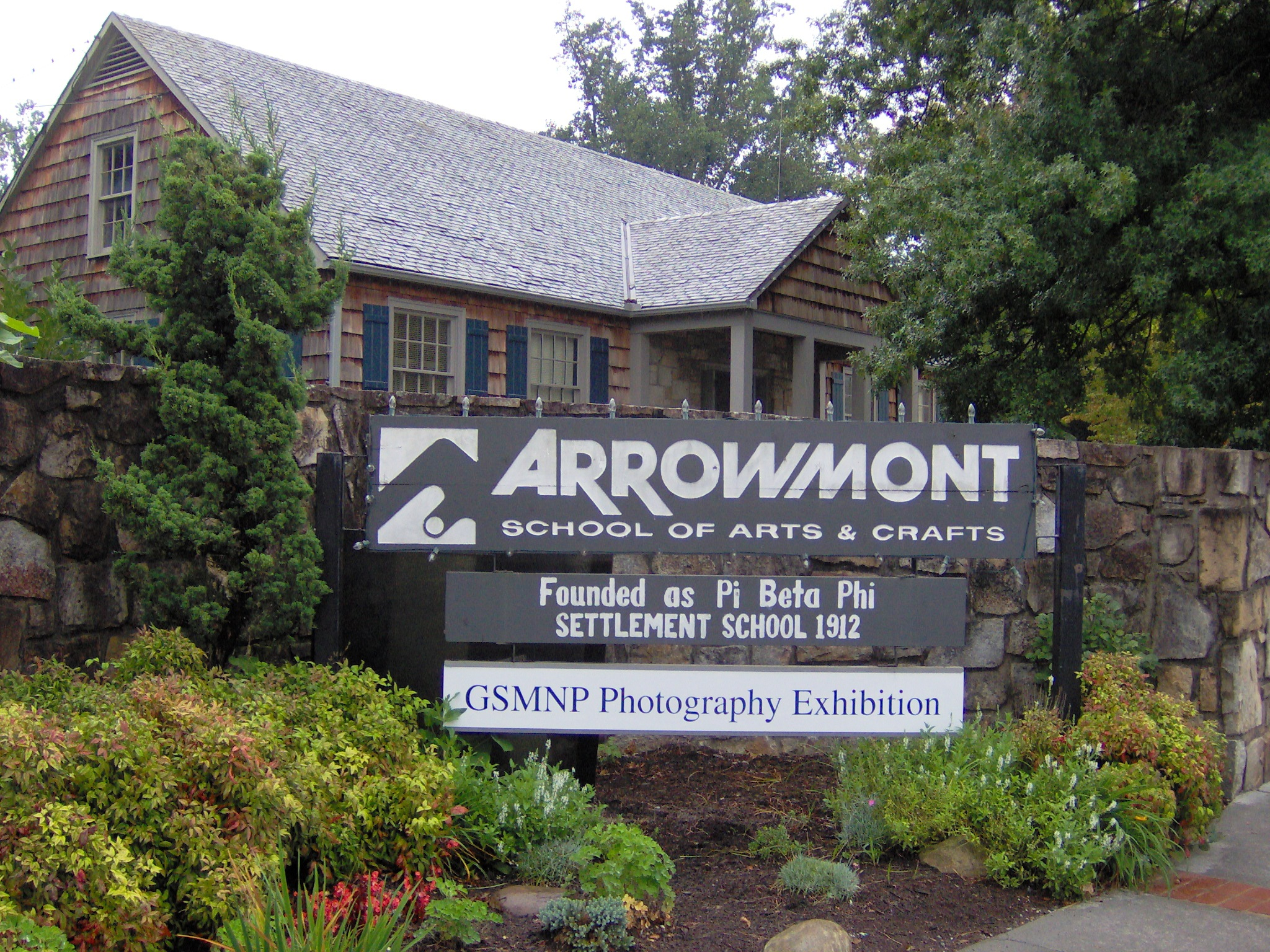

- Location within Tennessee Location within the United States
- Location: 556 Parkway, Gatlinburg, Tennessee
- Coordinates: 35°42′45″N 83°30′37″W
- Area: 5 acres (2.0 ha)
- Built: 1916–1952
- Architect: Alda Wilson, Elmina Wilson; Barber & McMurry (architects)
- Architectural style: Bungalow/Craftsman; Colonial Revival
- MPS: Pi Beta Phi Settlement School MPS
- NRHP reference No.: 07000185
- Added to NRHP: March 20, 2007

Arrowmont School of Arts and Crafts is an Arts and Crafts center in the U.S. city of Gatlinburg, Tennessee. The oldest craft school in Tennessee, Arrowmont offers workshops in arts and crafts such as painting, woodworking, drawing, glass, photography, basket weaving, ceramics, fiber arts, book arts and metalworking. The School has an 11-month Artists-in-Residence program for early career artists. Arrowmont's campus contains the oldest buildings in Gatlinburg and comprises two historic districts listed on the National Register of Historic Places.

Arrowmont's history is rooted in a settlement school founded by the Pi Beta Phi women's fraternity in Gatlinburg in 1912. The school provided the only public education for children in the Gatlinburg area until Sevier County assumed control of its public schools in the early 1940s. The early writings and reports of the settlement school's teachers provide an important glimpse of Gatlinburg in the days before the establishment of the Great Smoky Mountains National Park radically changed the city's economy and culture. Pi Beta Phi helped prime Gatlinburg for the coming tourism boom, and also helped Gatlinburg residents tap into the national market for the crafts of Southern Appalachia with the establishment of Arrowcraft in the 1920s.

After the county gained control of the settlement school in 1943, Pi Beta Phi and the University of Tennessee established the craft workshops that evolved into what is now Arrowmont.

The school's campus was damaged on November 29, 2016, when a wildfire from the nearby Great Smoky Mountains National Park spread throughout Gatlinburg. Arrowmont lost two dormitories and a maintenance shed. All other buildings were unharmed.

== History ==
=== Establishment of the settlement school ===
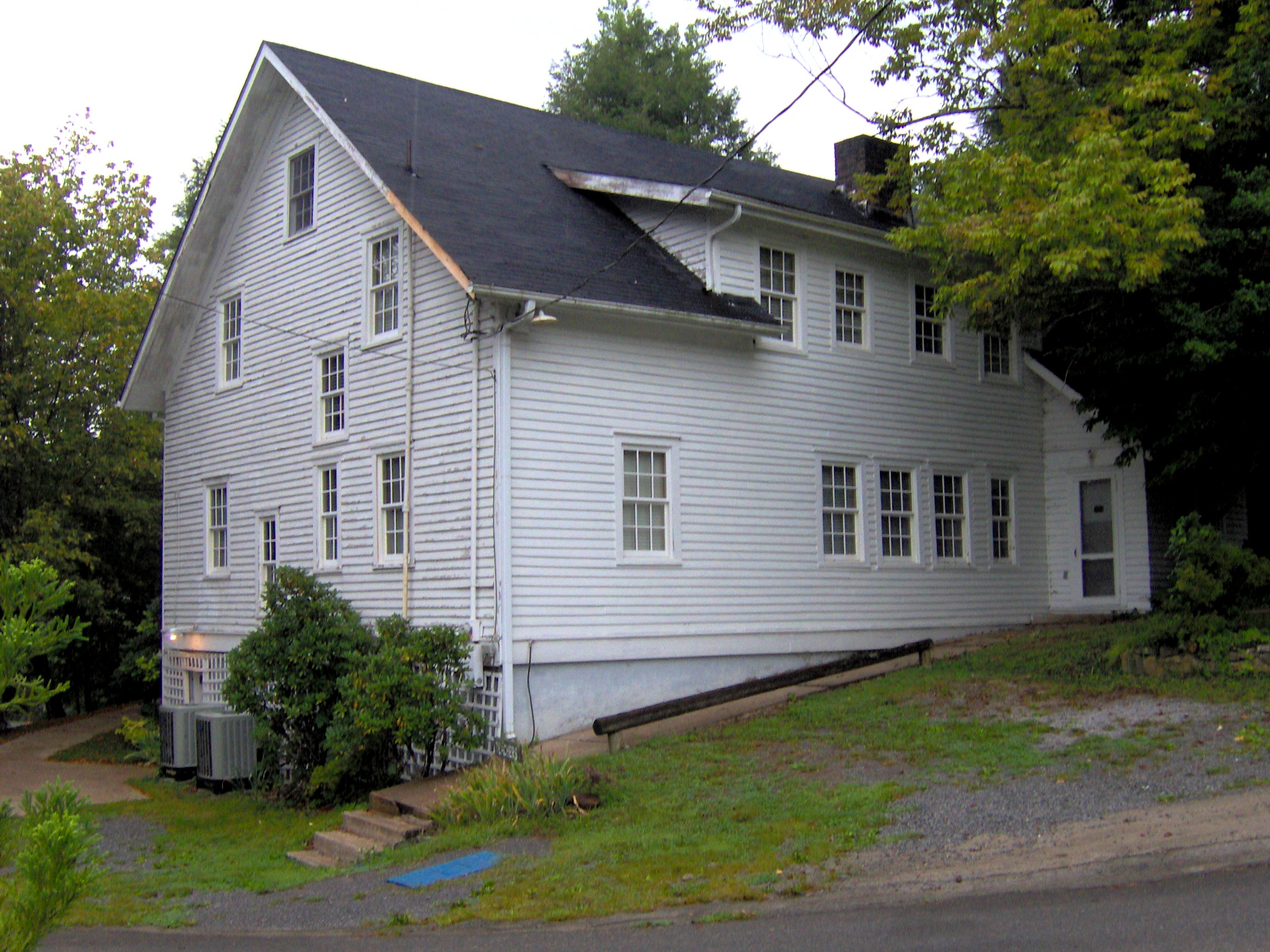
The Teacher's Cottage, or Helmick House, built in 1916

In the early 20th century, reports of widespread poverty and lack of education in Southern Appalachia gained the attention of religious and philanthropic organizations. Inspired by the settlement house movement that began in the previous century, these organizations established "settlement schools" in remote mountain communities to provide free education. In June 1910, former Pi Beta Phi Grand President Emma Harper Turner spoke at the fraternity's national convention and suggested the fraternity establish such a school as a memorial for its 50th anniversary. The fraternity's National Alumnae Association authorized the school on June 30, and fraternity leaders initiated an extensive study to locate a mountain community that would most benefit from a new school. The U.S. Commissioner of Education suggested they establish such a school in Tennessee, and the Tennessee Department of Education identified Sevier County as having the fewest schools. An East Tennessee teacher, Mabel Moore, pointed the Pi Beta Phis to Gatlinburg— then a tiny mountain hamlet at the edge of the Great Smoky Mountains— as the community most in need of a new school. In 1910, Pi Beta Phi Grand President May Lansfield Keller made the 17-mile (27 km) trek from Sevierville to Gatlinburg over what she called "the worst road in Tennessee" and verified that Gatlinburg was the best choice for the fraternity's first philanthropy.

Nashville native Martha Hill was chosen as the school's first teacher, and classes began February 20, 1912, in an abandoned schoolhouse at the confluence of Baskins Creek and the Little Pigeon River. As many of the locals were initially suspicious of the Pi Beta Phis, the school's first-year enrollment was just 13, but by the end of the term the school's enrollment had grown to 33, and continued growing the following term. Sevier County allowed the Settlement School use of the county's school along Roaring Fork the following autumn, but as enrollment grew, the Settlement School needed more classroom space. When Ephraim Ogle offered to sell 35 acres (14 ha) along Baskins Creek for $1,800 in 1913, the fraternity offered $600 toward the purchase price, but demanded the city put up the remaining $1,200. When the locals showed little enthusiasm for the purchase, Pi Beta Phi threatened to close the school. A last minute effort led by Andrew Huff, Steve Whaley, and Isaac Maples raised the necessary funds, however, and Ogle transferred the deed on the evening of the deadline set by Pi Beta Phi.

=== Settlement school operations, 1915—1943 ===
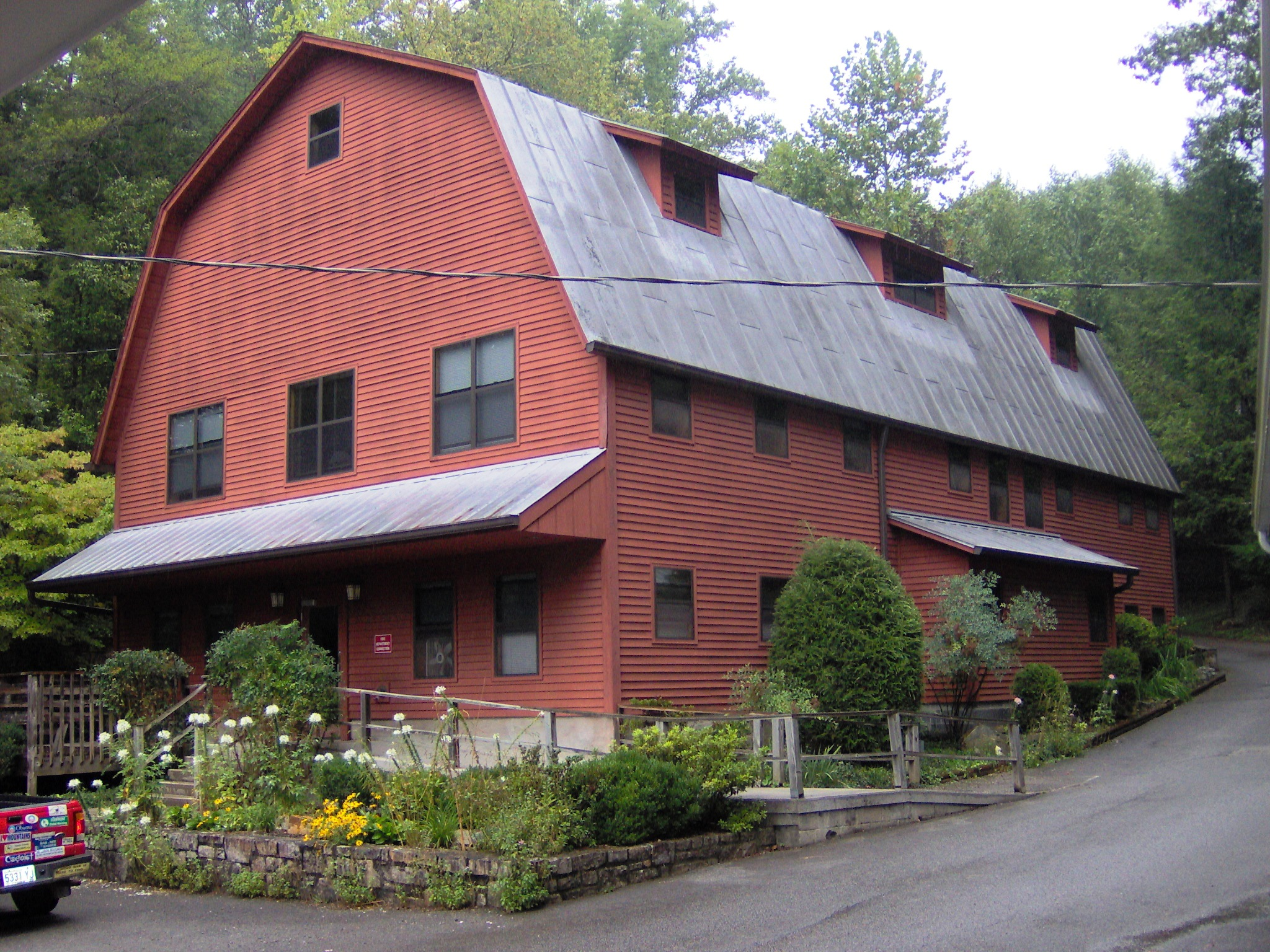
The Red Barn, also called the Model Barn or Stock Barn, originally built in 1923 as part of the settlement school's vocational agriculture program

Early teachers at the Pi Beta Phi settlement school were moved by the "sad faces" and "stolid character" of the mountain children. The teachers were surprised to learn that many of the children didn't know basic children's games, and most knew nothing about traditional Christmas celebrations. As the mountain children were fond of running through the forest barefooted, hookworm was a common parasite, and teacher Mary Pollard spent much of her 1913–1916 tenure trying to eradicate it. The Pi Beta Phis built a new six-room schoolhouse in 1914, and in 1916 added a new ten-room teacher's cottage. During the 1918 flu pandemic, Head Resident Evelyn Bishop made numerous house calls in Gatlinburg and the vicinity that endeared the school to the local population. In 1920, Pi Beta Phi dispatched Canadian-born nurse Phyllis Higinbotham (who had previously worked at the Henry Street Settlement and Hindman Settlement School) to Gatlinburg to oversee the settlement school's health care needs.

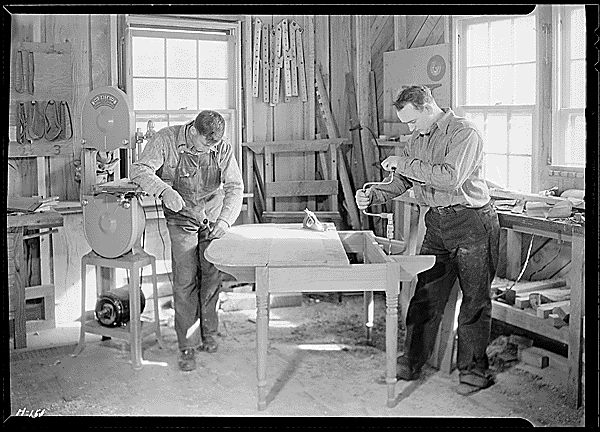
The Woodcrafters and Carvers shop in Gatlinburg, founded by Pi Beta Phi teacher O.J. Mattil in the late 1920s

In 1920, Pi Beta Phi installed Gatlinburg's first electric generator to provide power to the school. The following year, the school installed the town's first telephone in the Head Resident's office. Around the same time, Pi Beta Phi teachers began teaching classes in the impoverished Sugarlands community south of Gatlinburg. A small hydroelectric dam was built in 1924 to replace the 1920 generator, and the school began publishing Gatlinburg's first newspaper, The Gatlinburg News, in 1925. In 1924, the Pi Beta Phis organized Gatlinburg's first agriculture co-op and later organized the town's first Chamber of Commerce. The Settlement School's influence helped Gatlinburg maximize the benefits of the tourist boom that came in the 1930s, and helped keep much of the profits from the tourism industry in local hands. A number of the Settlement School's students went on to play important roles in the development of Gatlinburg and the vicinity in the subsequent decades, among them Bruce Whaley (Riverside Hotel), Dick Whaley (Greystone Inn), Jack Huff (LeConte Lodge), and Charles Earl Ogle (the Mountain Mall and various other ventures).

In 1943, Sevier County assumed control of the Pi Beta Phi schools, and built a new school for elementary school students in 1950. Pi Beta Phi High School was consolidated with the high school at nearby Pittman Center in 1963 to form Gatlinburg-Pittman High School. Pi Beta Phi Elementary School, located immediately south of the Arrowmont campus, still serves Gatlinburg's kindergarten through 8th grade students (the current school building was built in the 1960s).

=== Arrowcraft ===
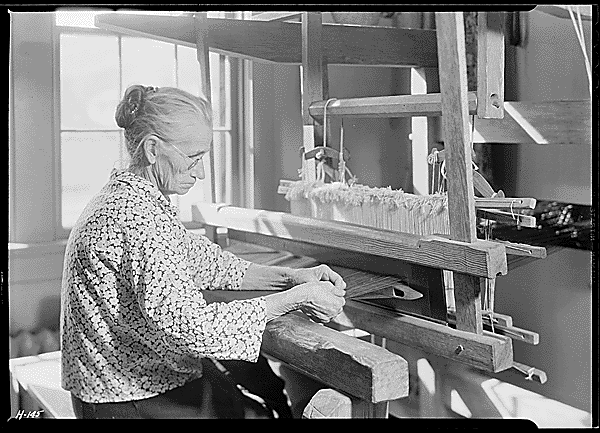
"Aunt" Lizzie Reagan weaving for the Arrowcraft shop, photographed by Lewis Wickes Hine in 1933

The American Arts and Crafts Revival, which began in the 19th century, helped create a market for traditional handicrafts that settlement house workers seized upon as a means of income for urban immigrants. In the early 20th century, the settlement school movement opened the same markets to the residents of Southern Appalachia. Noting the success of other settlement schools in marketing the region's crafts, Phi Beta Phi Settlement School Head Resident Caroline McKnight Hughes began purchasing handmade baskets and coverlets to sell to the fraternity's alumnae clubs. While Hughes easily found buyers for the items she purchased, she struggled with lack of cooperation from the locals, who didn't fully understand the demand for their products, and often ignored shipment deadlines and refused to sell items on credit.

In 1925, weaving instructor Winogene Redding joined the settlement school's staff, and began teaching traditional weaving. By 1926, 30 families were weaving for the school, and had successfully adapted to Redding's strict factory-like regimen of quality and deadlines. In 1927, teachers Harmo Taylor and Lois Rogers opened the Arrowcraft Shop on the settlement school's campus, which acted as both a showroom for passing tourists and a distribution center for shipments (the shop was named after Pi Beta Phi's primary symbol, the arrow). Representatives from Arrowcraft helped establish the Southern Highland Craft Guild in 1929, which gave local artisans greater access to national markets. The Guild presently operates the Arrowcraft Store, which was built in 1940.

=== Arrowmont ===
After Sevier County assumed control of the Pi Beta Phi schools in 1943, the fraternity began focusing on its Arrowcraft division. In 1945, with the help of the University of Tennessee Home Economics Department, Pi Beta Phi established the Summer Crafts Workshop, which provided craft classes to students and teachers. The success of the workshops led to a proposal at the fraternity's 1954 convention to create a permanent, year-round school in Gatlinburg. The 1962 convention authorized the project.

In 1968, Pi Beta Phi disbanded the Settlement School Committee and established a Board of Governors for the new crafts school. The following year, the name "Arrowmont" was chosen, and Summer Crafts Workshop director Marian Heard was selected as head of the new school. In June 1970, Arrowmont dedicated its new 38,200-square-foot (3,550 m^{2}) Emma Harper Turner Building, which provides offices, classrooms, and studio space (the building's architect, Hubert Bebb, earned an Award of Merit from the American Institute of Architects for his design).

== Arrowmont today ==
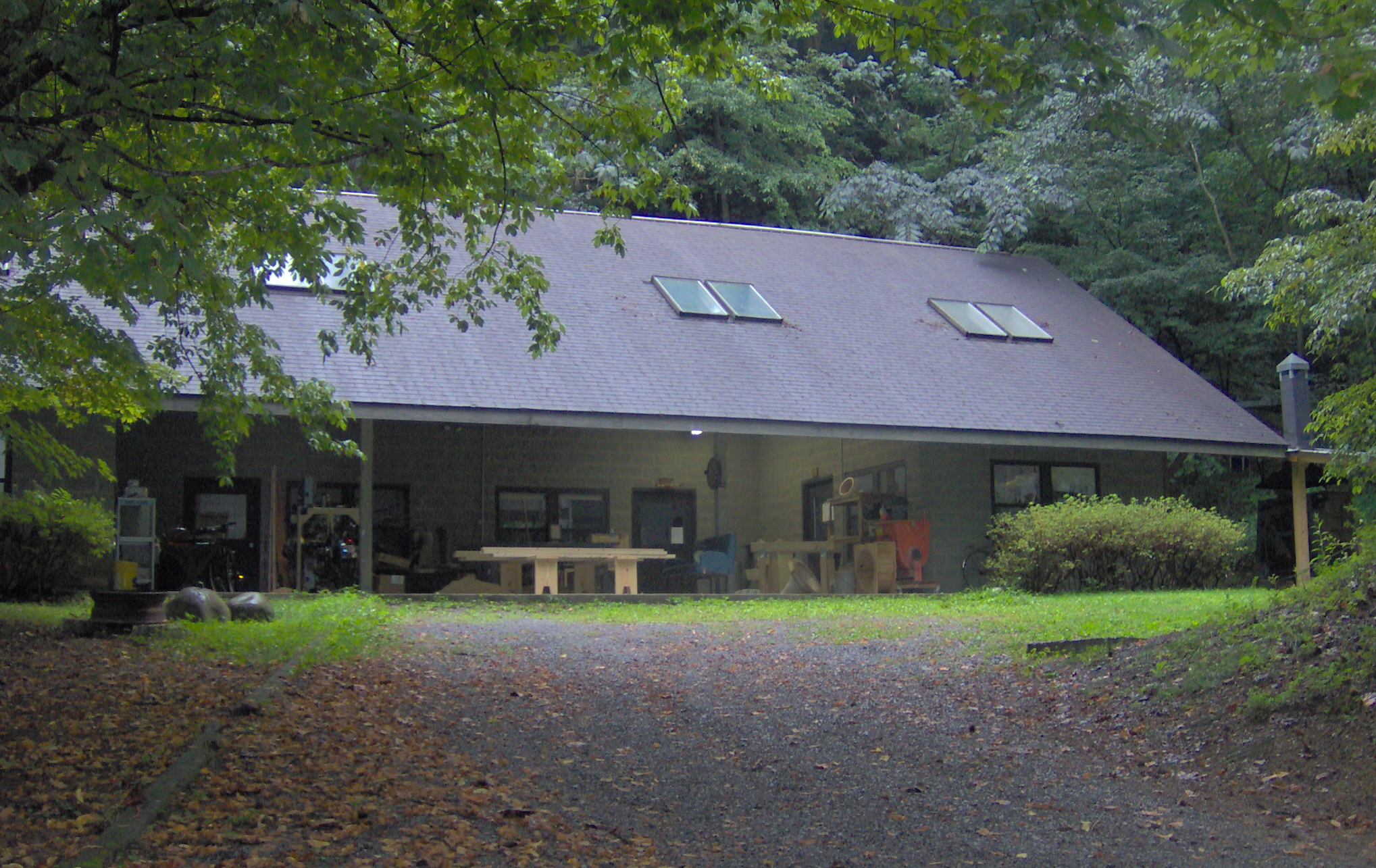
A modern workshop at Arrowmont

Arrowmont is currently known for its seasonal weekend, one-week and two-week workshops, which attract students from all over the world. Along with traditional handicrafts such as weaving and basketry, the school's curriculum has expanded to include courses on metalworking, ceramics, jewelry making, painting, photography, drawing, book binding, quilting, glasswork and woodworking. The school displays its work in five galleries on campus.

Arrowmont sponsors an 11-month Artist-in-Residence program for five artists selected annually. The school has also hosted dozens of conferences for various entities, including the American Craft Council, the Tennessee Art and Education Association, the Tennessee Watercolor Society, and a 1985 woodturner's conference that spawned the American Association of Woodturners. Major exhibitions hosted by Arrowmont have included the 1979 Southeastern Conference and Traditional Basketry Forms Exhibition, the 1982 Forms of Leather Exhibition, the 1983 Directions in Surface Design Exhibition, and the 1999 All Things Considered Exhibition. Arrowmont hosts major symposia, such as Utilitarian Clay: Celebrate The Object. Additionally, Arrowmont hosts over 1,200 local school children annually for a day of hands-on art immersion through its ArtReach program.

=== Property sale proposals ===
In July 2008, Pi Beta Phi notified Arrowmont that it had entered into negotiations with anonymous business interests for the sale of its Arrowmont property. While the fraternity offered to help fund the relocation of Arrowmont (and the business interests seeking to purchase the land stated that the preservation of Arrowmont was part of their development plans), the Arrowmont Board of Directors staunchly opposed the sale in a statement issued in 2008, arguing that any relocation would affect the school's future prosperity. On October 30, 2008, Pi Beta Phi withdrew from negotiations to sell the property.

In late 2013, Pi Beta Phi informed the Board of Governors of Arrowmont that they could purchase the property for $8,000,000 but that they had to raise the amount in 7 months. The City of Gatlinburg contributed $3,500,000 and the Sevier County Commission invested $750,000 "for a lot of reasons but ultimately, it was the right thing to do," according to Larry Waters, Mayor of the Sevier County Commission. A private foundation added $2,750,000 and the Arrowmont Board of Governors $300,000. Numerous gifts from Arrowmont's local and national friends narrowed the gap until only $500,000 remained to be raised. On April 2, 2014, the Board of Governors closed on a loan for $500,000 that made up the difference and the property was sold to Arrowmont.

== NRHP-listed structures ==
The Arrowmont campus currently contains two historic districts listed on the National Register of Historic Places. The Settlement School Dormitories and Dwellings Historic District, added March 20, 2007, consists of six structures and comprises approximately 5 acres (2.0 ha) on the east side of the Arrowmont campus. The Settlement School Community Outreach Historic District, added July 11, 2007, consists of five structures and comprises approximately 6 acres (2.4 ha) on the west side of the campus.

=== Settlement School Dormitories and Dwellings Historic District ===
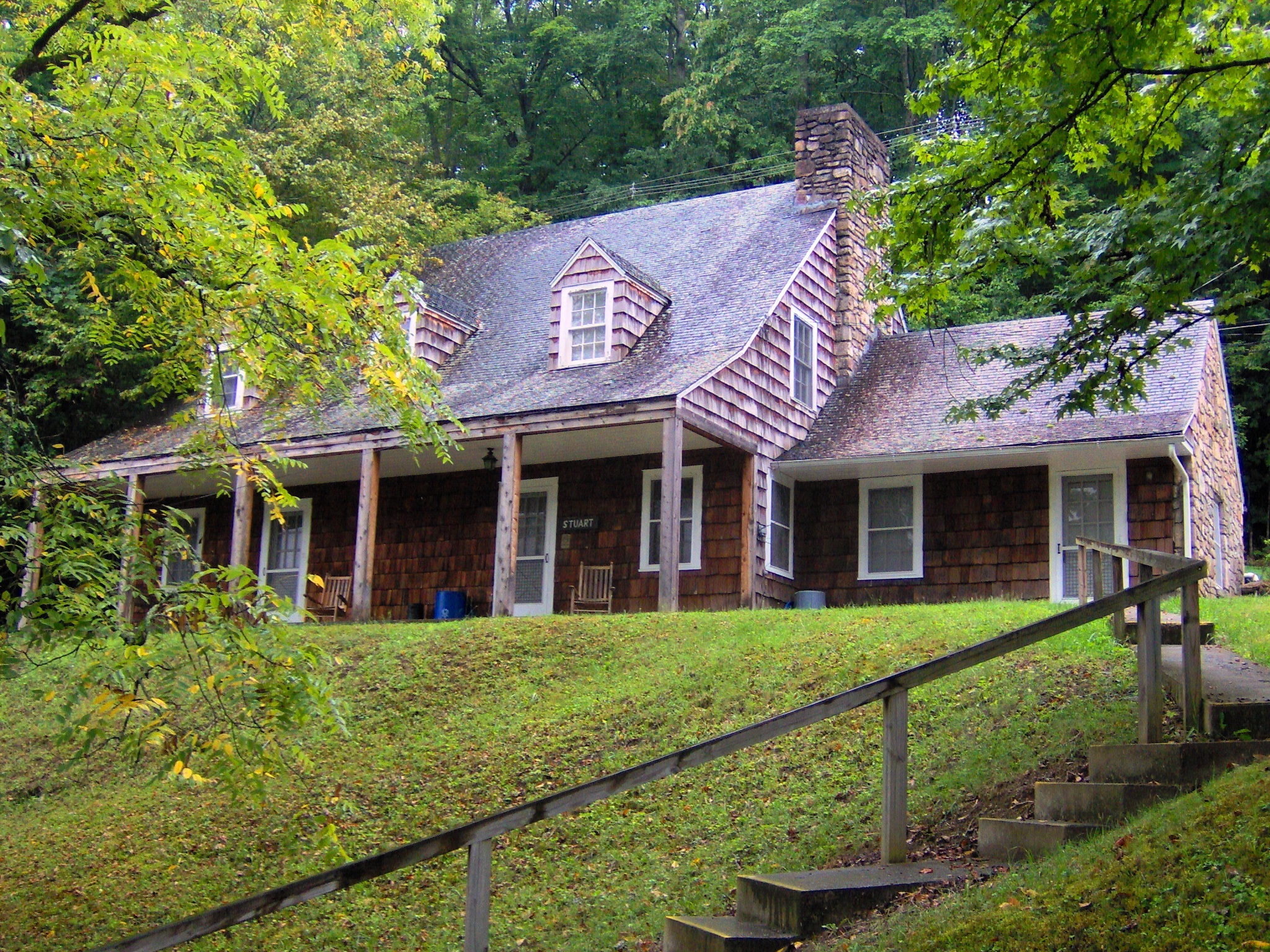
Stuart Dormitory, built in 1941

- Helmick House/Teacher's Cottage, a 1 1/2-story frame bungalow built in 1916, and designed by architects (and Pi Beta Phi alumnae) Alda and Elmina Wilson. Locals provided the lumber and did much of the carpentry work.
- Stuart Dormitory, a 1 1/2-story Colonial Revival dwelling built in 1941 and designed by Knoxville architects Barber & McMurry (this firm also designed the headquarters for the Great Smoky Mountains National Park a few miles to the south). The Stuart Dormitory replaced a cottage of the same name used by teachers before the construction of Helmick House. The original cottage was purchased by Pi Beta Phi sisters Melinda and Ann Stuart for the school's use in 1916.
- Ruth Barrett Smith Staff House, or simply "Staff House," a one-story Colonial Revival building built in 1952 and designed by Barber & McMurry. The dining room was added to the west end in 1989.
- Old Wood Studio, two attached one-story buildings and with an open-air workspace built in 1952.
- Chicken coop, a one-story shed with a metal roof built in around 1923. Along with the Red Barn, the chicken coop was built as part of the settlement school's vocational agricultural program in the early 1920s.
- Stock Barn, usually called the "Red Barn" and occasionally referred to as the "Model Barn," a two-story wooden crib barn built in 1923 and renovated in 1959 by Barber & McMurry. The barn was initially built as a model of proper barn construction as part of the settlement school's vocational agriculture program, and later used as a gymnasium and theater. It was renovated in 1959 for use as a dormitory.

=== Settlement School Community Outreach Historic District ===
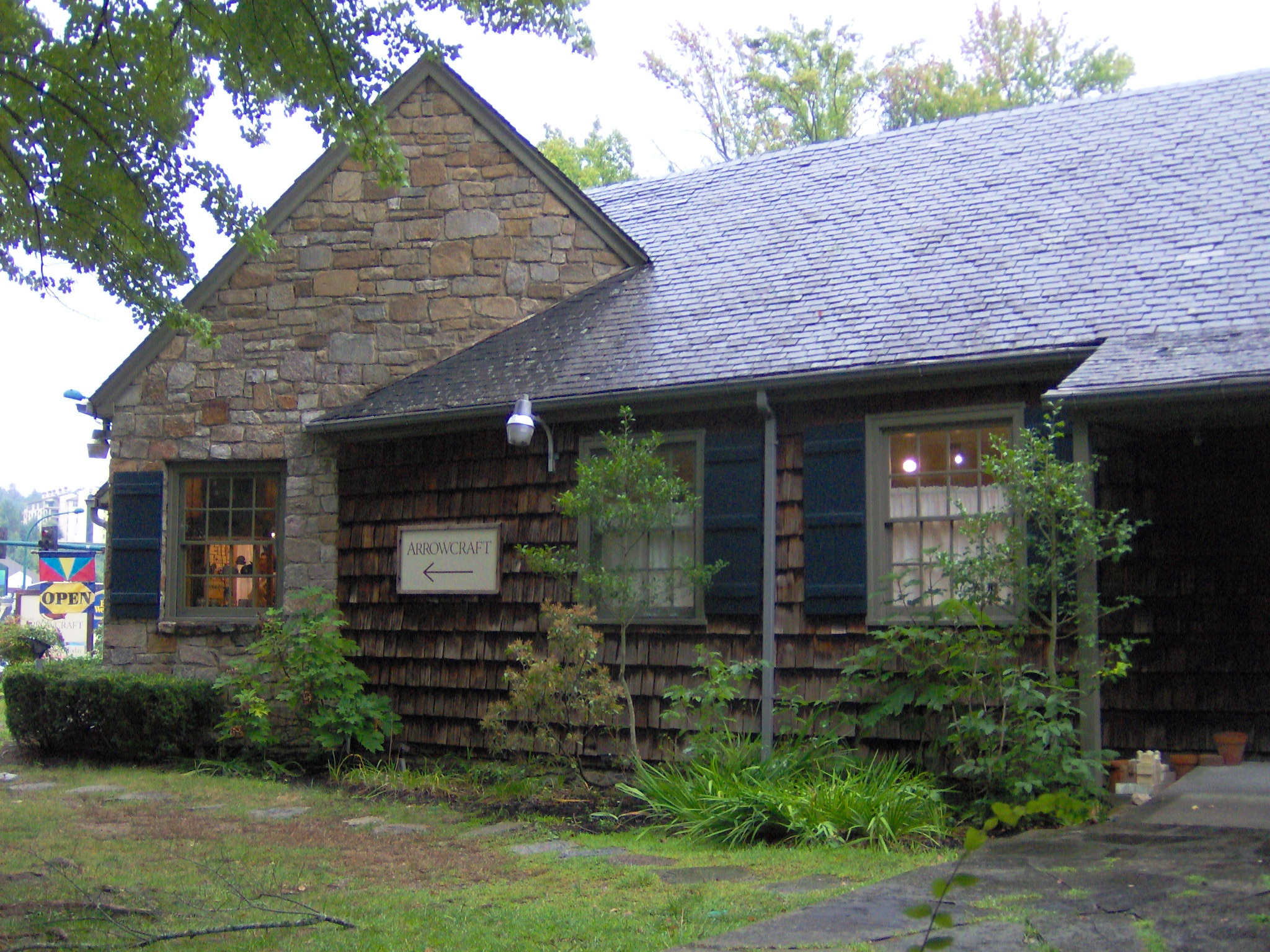
The "new" Arrowcraft Shop, originally built in 1940

- Jennie Nicol Health Clinic Building, a one-story Rustic-style building built in 1948 and designed by Barber & McMurry. The building replaced a smaller clinic of the same name, which had been set up in 1922. The building's namesake was a founding member of Pi Beta Phi who died shortly after obtaining her medical degree.
- Arrowcraft Shop, a one-story Rustic-style building built in 1940 and designed by Barber & McMurry. A one-story annex, also designed by Barber & McMurry, was added sometime around 1960, and now houses the shop's administrative offices. A third addition, designed by the Knoxville firm Cooper & Perry, was added in 1978 and now houses the gift shop.
- Ogle Cabin, a half-dovetail notched single-pen log cabin built around 1807 by Gatlinburg's original pioneer settlers. Local tradition suggests that William Ogle (c. 1756–1803) "discovered" White Oak Flats (modern Gatlinburg) in the early 19th century, and cut and hewed the logs for the cabin with plans to return at some point with his family. Although William died before he could return, his wife, Martha Huskey, and her children and brothers made the trek to White Oak Flats in 1807 and assembled the logs. The descendants of William and Martha Ogle are still very active in the public and economic affairs of Gatlinburg. Pi Beta Phi set up a museum of mountain life in the cabin in the early 1920s. This cabin should not be confused with the NRHP-listed Noah Ogle Place, which lies inside the park a few miles south of Gatlinburg.
- Cottage at the Creek, a one-story L-shaped Rustic-style building originally built around 1913 for use as a schoolhouse, expanded around 1926 for use as the original Arrowcraft Shop, and currently home to the Thomas Kinkade Gallery. Architect Hubert Bebb used it as an office while designing the Turner Building.
- Craftsman's Fair Grounds and School Playground, a large open space between the community outreach buildings and Pi Beta Phi Elementary School, originally used as a food garden by the settlement school, and later the site of the first Southern Highland Handicraft Guild Craftsman's Fair in 1948. Part of the grounds now serve as a playground for the elementary school.
