= Pi Beta Phi =

North American collegiate sorority

- ΠΒΦ
- Founded: April 28, 1867; 159 years ago Monmouth College
- Type: Social
- Affiliation: NPC
- Status: Active
- Scope: North America
- Motto: Connect. Serve. Shine
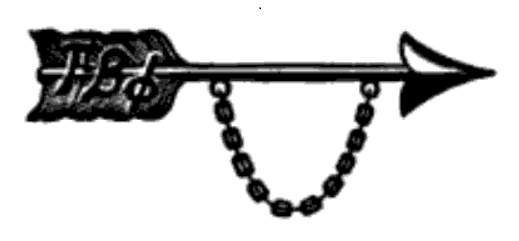
- Member badge
- Colors: Wine and Silver Blue
- Symbol: Arrow
- Flower: Wine carnation
- Mascot: Angel
- Publication: The ARROW
- Philanthropy: Read > Lead > Achieve
- Chapters: 136 active
- Members: 21,000+ active
- Headquarters: 1154 Town & Country Commons Drive; Town & Country, Missouri 63017; United States
- Website: www.pibetaphi.org

Pi Beta Phi (ΠΒΦ), often known simply as Pi Phi, is an international women's fraternity founded at Monmouth College, in Monmouth, Illinois, on April 28, 1867, as I. C. Sorosis, the first national secret college society of women to be modeled after men's Greek-letter fraternities. It is sometimes referred to by its original designation, a women's fraternity, as it was founded before the term "sorority" was coined.

Pi Phi's headquarters are in Town and Country, Missouri. Since its founding, it has installed over 200 chapters and more than 300 alumnae organizations across the United States and Canada. Most of the fraternity's official philanthropies are in the category of education/literacy programs or preservation of traditional arts and crafts. Pi Beta Phi is one of 26 international sororities that are members of the National Panhellenic Conference.

== History ==
Pi Beta Phi was founded as a secret organization under the name I. C. Sorosis on April 28, 1867 at Monmouth College in Monmouth, Illinois. It is regarded as the first national women's fraternity, although Kappa Alpha Theta was the first Greek-letter fraternity known among women in 1870. The founders were Margaret Campbell, Libbie Brook Gaddis, Ada Bruen Grier, Clara Brownlee Hutchinson, Emma Brownlee Kilgore, Fannie Whitenack Libbey, Rosa Moore, Rachel Nicol, Inez Smith Soule, Fannie Thomson, Jennie Horne Turnbull, and Nancy Black Wallace.

The organization was formed "to enjoy the benefits of a secret society similar to those formed by collegiate men". They planned their society at a home where two of the women rented a room, choosing I. C. Sorosis as the name and "Pi Beta Phi" as the motto.

Shortly after the founding, the sisters had a jeweler design their official badge: a golden arrow with the letters "I. C." on the wings. When the name changed to "Pi Beta Phi", the Greek letters replaced "I. C." on the wings. At the Yellowstone Convention of 1934, they voted to limit the links in the badge's chain; there are 12, one for each founder.

The first fraternity convention was held in 1868 at Fannie Thomson's home in Oquawka, Illinois. The fraternity's second chapter was established that same year at Iowa Wesleyan University in Mount Pleasant, Iowa. The expansion made Pi Beta Phi the first national (multi-chapter) women's secret society.

=== Name change and NPC membership ===
At the 1882 convention, the society officially adopted its motto as well as the fraternity colors of wine and silver blue. It began to use Greek letters as its name in 1888, when the name changed from I. C. Sorosis to Pi Beta Phi. In 1893, with the number of alumnae growing, the fraternity organized a national alumnae department. Cooperation among women's fraternities and sororities was formalized in 1902 with the founding of the National Panhellenic Conference, of which Pi Beta Phi was a founding member.

In 1907, Pi Beta Phi had 4,500 initiates across 36 collegiate chapters and 30 alumnae chapters. In 1908, its first Canadian chapter was established at the University of Toronto. In 1912, the fraternity's first philanthropy, Pi Beta Phi Settlement School, was organized in Gatlinburg, Tennessee. In 1913, the fraternity created local Alumnae Advisory Committees to support its chapters individually. Central Office, the fraternity headquarters, was established in 1925.

In the 1960s, G. William Domhoff, writing in Who Rules America?, listed Pi Beta Phi as one of "the four or five sororities with nationwide prestige."

== Symbols ==
The official symbol of Pi Beta Phi is the arrow. Its flower is the dark red or wine carnation. The fraternity colors are wine and silver blue. The unofficial mascot is the angel, nicknamed "Angelica". Pi Beta Phi does not have an official gemstone.

The crest is a lozenge emblazoned with the crest of the Brownlee family, two of whom were founders of the fraternity. The badge is a golden arrow with the Greek letters "ΠΒΦ" on the wings and a loop of chain on the shaft. The pledge pin is a golden arrowhead with the Greek letter "Β".

The Kansas Alpha chapter began publication of The Arrow in 1885; it would eventually become a quarterly magazine published by the international fraternity for all its members.

== Chapters and alumnae clubs ==
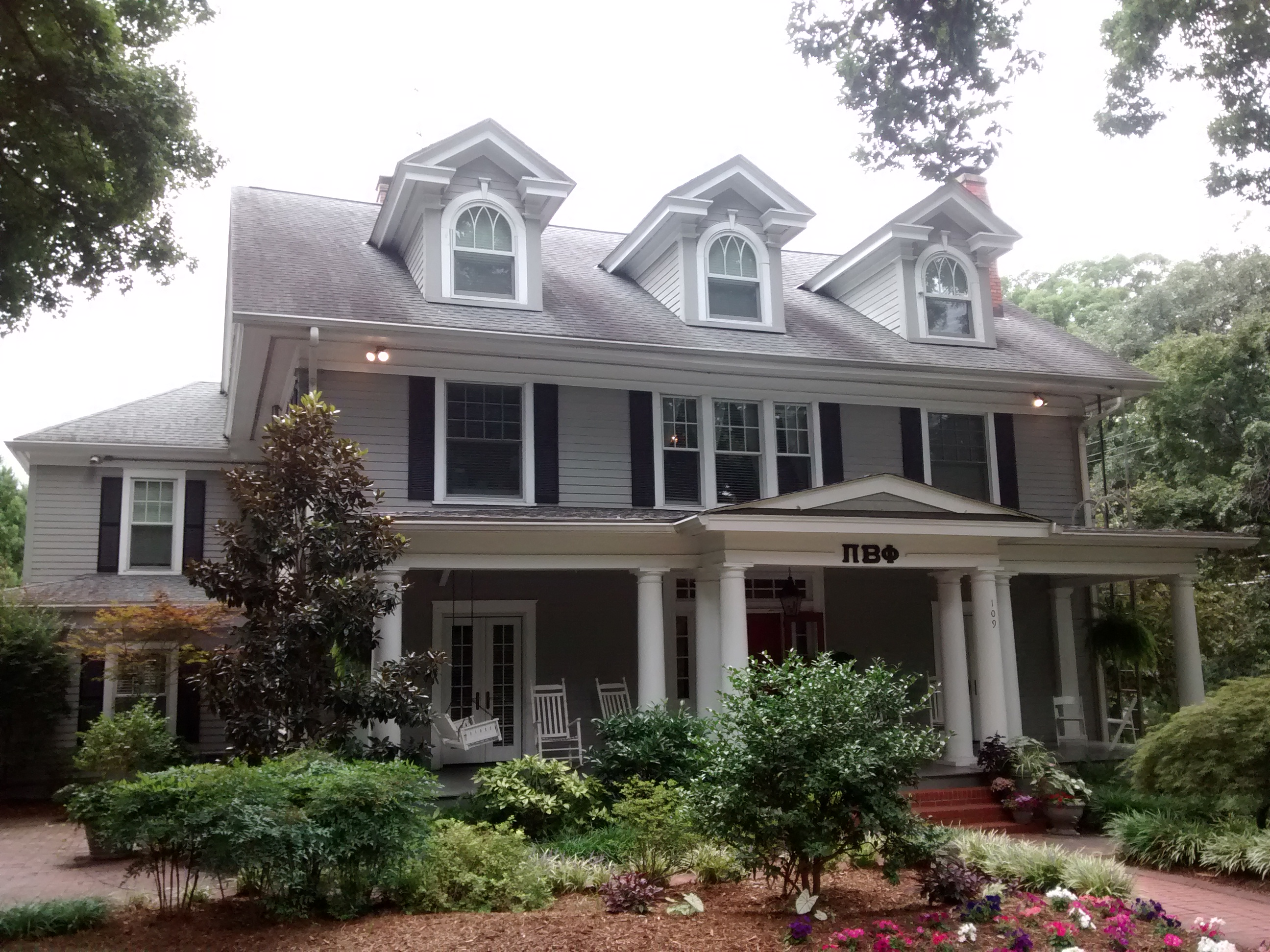
Pi Beta Phi house at University of North Carolina at Chapel Hill (2014)

Pi Beta Phi alumnae, initiated members in good standing who have graduated or otherwise left their college or university, can organize into local alumnae clubs, which are recognized by the fraternity. Like collegiate chapters, alumnae clubs are grouped geographically into regions, which is led by an Alumnae Regional Director.

== Governance ==
The international fraternity is governed by a Grand Council, elected at each biennial convention and comprising a Grand President and six Grand Vice Presidents (Alumnae, Collegians, Finance/Housing, Community Relations, Fraternity Growth, and Member Experience). Also elected biennially are seven international Directors (Alumnae, Operations, Finance/Housing, Community Relations, Recruitment, Risk Management and Member Experience) and two Directors for each region (Collegiate Regional Director and Alumnae Regional Director). The work of Directors is supervised by a member of the Grand Council.

In addition to the elected officers, there are several appointed international officers assigned certain functions, such as an archivist and a fraternity historian.

== Philanthropies ==
Like many sororities and fraternities, Pi Beta Phi members take part in several philanthropy programs. Over the fraternity's history, philanthropies have included education, literacy, and the preservation of regional arts and crafts.

In 1990, Pi Beta Phi created the Pi Beta Phi Foundation, a 501(c)(3) charitable organization.

=== Read > Lead > Achieve ===
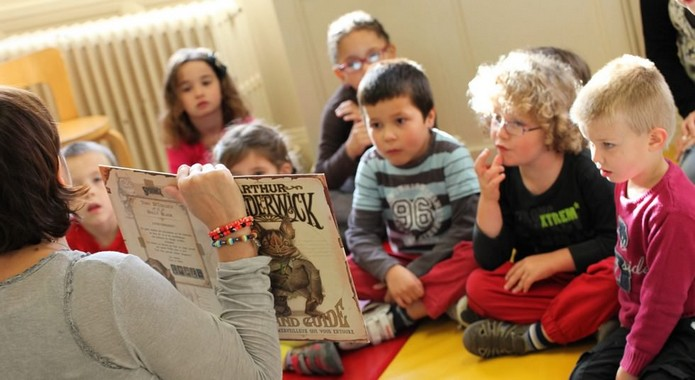
Woman reading picture book to children

Pi Phi's philanthropy is called Read>Lead>Achieve and is centered around children's literacy. Pi Phi's believe in unlocking the power of reading to create a more literate and productive society. To do so, Pi Phi has started a reading enrichment program for students in pre school through third grade called, "Champions are Readers". This program is funded through the Pi Beta Phi foundation and provides students with all materials needed for the program. Additionally, members can join a virtual book club to share their love of reading with their sisters.

=== Educational and cultural philanthropies ===
Pi Beta Phi opened the Pi Beta Phi Settlement School in Gatlinburg, Tennessee, in 1912 to provide education, economic opportunity, and health care to the rural area. Over the years, as the community took over childhood education, Settlement School began to adapt by offering arts and crafts classes to preserve and promote the region's crafts tradition. An extension of the Pi Beta Phi Settlement School called the Craft Work Shop was begun in 1945 in cooperation with the University of Tennessee. Now an independent nonprofit organization known as the Arrowmont School of Arts and Crafts, it is one of the oldest arts and crafts centers in the South.

== Chapter or member misconduct ==
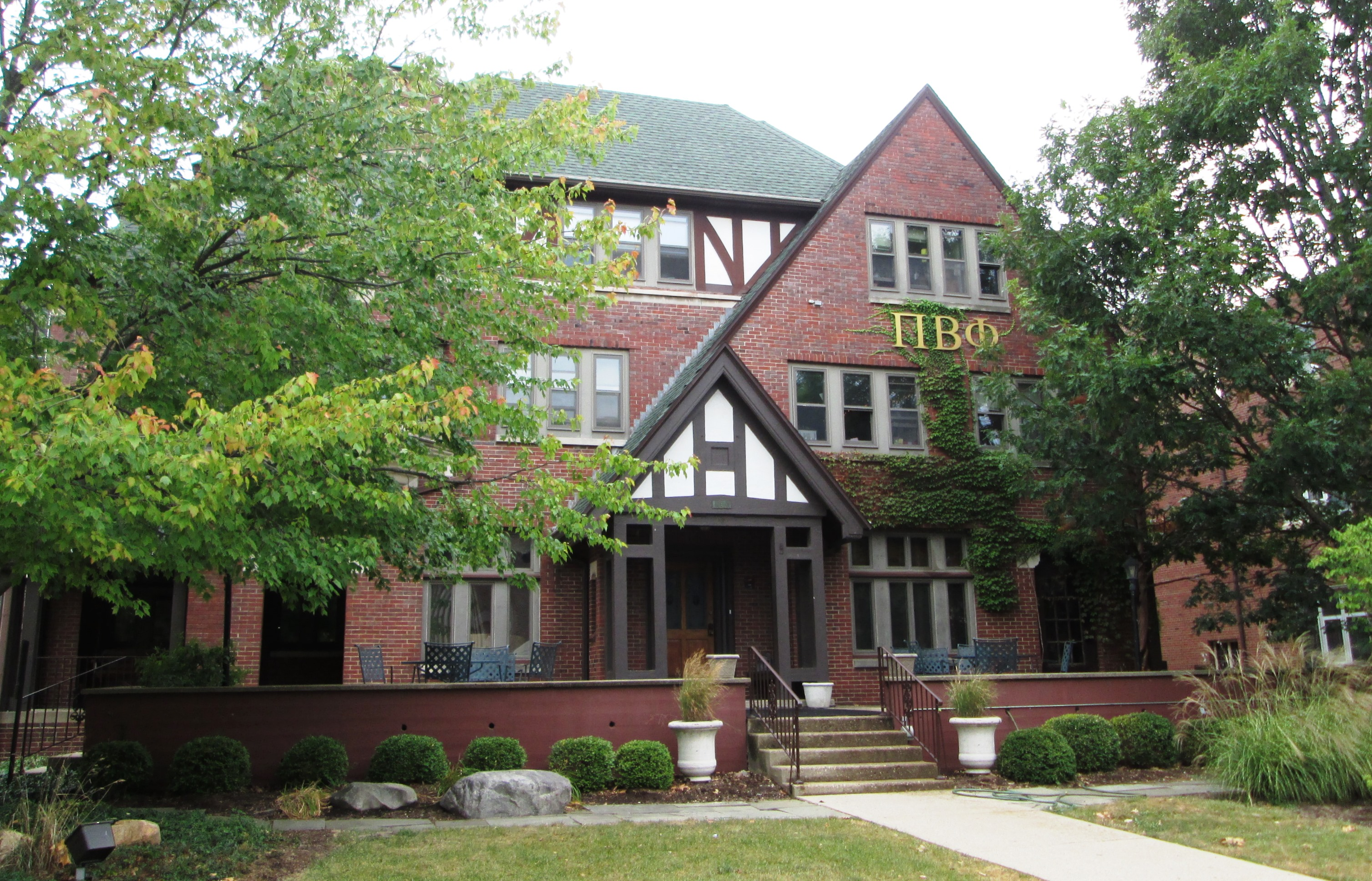
The chapter house of the Zeta chapter of the Pi Beta Phi sorority at the University of Illinois at Urbana-Champaign (2013)

In 2005, the chapter at the University of California, Los Angeles, was penalized for hazing pledges.

In 2010, the Cornell University chapter received national attention after the release of a seven-page email sent to members of the chapter to address acceptable attire for recruitment. The email's tone—with lines such as "No muffin tops or camel toe" and "I will not tolerate any gross plastic shizz [jewelry]"—was criticized by the Huffington Post and many online young adult forums.

In 2010, the Miami University chapter was suspended for a year after underage drinking, vomiting, littering, and damaging Lake Lyndsay Lodge in Hamilton, Ohio. In 2017, the organization closed that chapter, saying, "the decision was made because the membership experience has routinely fallen below Fraternity expectations, particularly in regards to risk management and the lack of commitment to Pi Beta Phi's core values."

In 2012, the Bucknell University chapter was suspended for at least three years for violation of the international chapter's policy and position statements regarding event planning-management and alcohol use. The chapter has since closed permanently.

In 2013, the University of Nevada, Reno chapter was banned from campus until the last active member graduated due to repeated hazing violations.

In 2013 and 2014, sorority women from multiple chapters at the University of Alabama—including Pi Beta Phi, Kappa Delta, Chi Omega, Delta Delta Delta, Alpha Omicron Pi, and Alpha Gamma Delta—alleged that either active members or some of their alumnae had prevented them from offering membership to black candidates because of their race. An anonymous Pi Beta Phi member told the university newspaper, The Crimson White, that alumnae threatened to cut financial support to the chapter if it offered membership to a black candidate the chapter wanted to recruit. Students held a campus march to integrate Greek life on campus, and after media and national outcry, the university held a second round of recruitment in hopes of offering membership to more women, including black women. In 2021, Emory University's chapter faced allegations of racism and sexual assault coverups.

== See also ==
- List of social sororities and women's fraternities
- National Panhellenic Conference
