= Margaret Tupper True =

American educator (1858 – 1926)

- Born: Margaret Allen Tupper; 1858
- Died: January 10, 1926 (aged 67–68); Denver, Colorado
- Known for: president of the Denver School Board, 1906-1908
- Children: Allen Tupper True
- Parent: Ellen Smith Tupper
- Relatives: Eliza Tupper Wilkes, Mila Tupper Maynard, Kate Tupper Galpin (sisters)

Margaret Allen Tupper True (1858 – January 10, 1926) was an American educator. She was president of the Denver School Board from 1906 to 1908.

== Early life ==
Margaret Allen Tupper was born in 1858, the daughter of Allen Tupper and Ellen Smith Tupper. Her father was a Protestant minister; her mother was a writer and editor, and an expert beekeeper. Her sisters included Unitarian ministers Eliza Tupper Wilkes and Mila Tupper Maynard, and educator Kate Tupper Galpin. Aged 14 she became the vice-president of the "State Poultry Association" in Iowa.

== Career ==
Margaret Tupper taught school in Colorado Springs as a young woman. She (and three of her sisters) spoke at the Woman's Congress in San Francisco in 1894. She presented at the Mothers' Congress of Utah in 1898, as president of the Educational Alliance of Denver, on "Sister Professions: The Home and School". She was the elected president of the Denver School Board from 1906 to 1908, and was head of the district's truancy department. "For the first time in a city of the first class a woman has been elected president of the school board," announced the Journal of Education. She worked for the abolition of secret societies among students in Denver.

== Personal life ==
Margaret Allen Tupper married Henry Alphonso True (1837-1925). Their eldest son was illustrator and muralist Allen Tupper True (1881-1955). Their other sons were Henry A. True (born 1883) and James Beaman True (born 1887), both civil engineers. She died at home in Denver in 1926, aged 67 years. Her grave is with her husband's and sons', in Colorado Springs, Colorado. Her diary was part of an exhibit at the Lawrence A. Fleischman Gallery in Washington, D.C. in 2014 and 2015.
