= Eagle Rock =

Eagle Rock may refer to:

== Entertainment ==
- "Eagle Rock" (song), a hit single in 1971 by Australian band Daddy Cool
- "Eagle Rock", a song by Motörhead
- Eagle Rock Entertainment, a record label

== Places ==
- Eagle Rock (formation), in California
- Eagle Rock (Idaho), an early name for Idaho Falls, Idaho
- Eagle Rock, Los Angeles, a neighborhood in California
- Eagle Rock, Pacific Crest Trail, Southern California
- Eagle Rock (Santa Monica Mountains), California
- Eagle Rock (Massachusetts), estate owned by Henry Clay Frick in Prides Crossing, Beverly, Massachusetts
- Eagle Rock, Missouri
- Eagle Rock, North Carolina, an unincorporated community in Wake County
- Eagle Rock (Pistol River, Oregon), listed on the NRHP in Curry County, Oregon
- Eagle Rock, Virginia, a town in northern Botetourt County
- Eagle Rock in Hill County, Montana
- Eagle Rock in Mineral County, Montana
- Eagle Rock Reservation, New Jersey, on First Mountain in the Watchung Range

== Other ==
- Alexander Eaglerock, a 1920s and 1930s American biplane
