= Santa Cecilia Orchestra =

Santa Cecilia Orchestra may refer to:

- the Orquesta Clásica Santa Cecilia of Madrid, Spain
- the Orchestra dell'Accademia Nazionale di Santa Cecilia of Rome, Italy
- the Santa Cecilia Orchestra (Los Angeles) of Los Angeles, California, United States
