= Myron Reed =

Myron Reed may refer to:

- Myron Reed (politician) (1836–1907), American senator
- Myron Reed (wrestler) (born 1996), American professional wrestler
- Myron W. Reed (1836–1899), American political activist
