= Brighton, Iowa =

- City
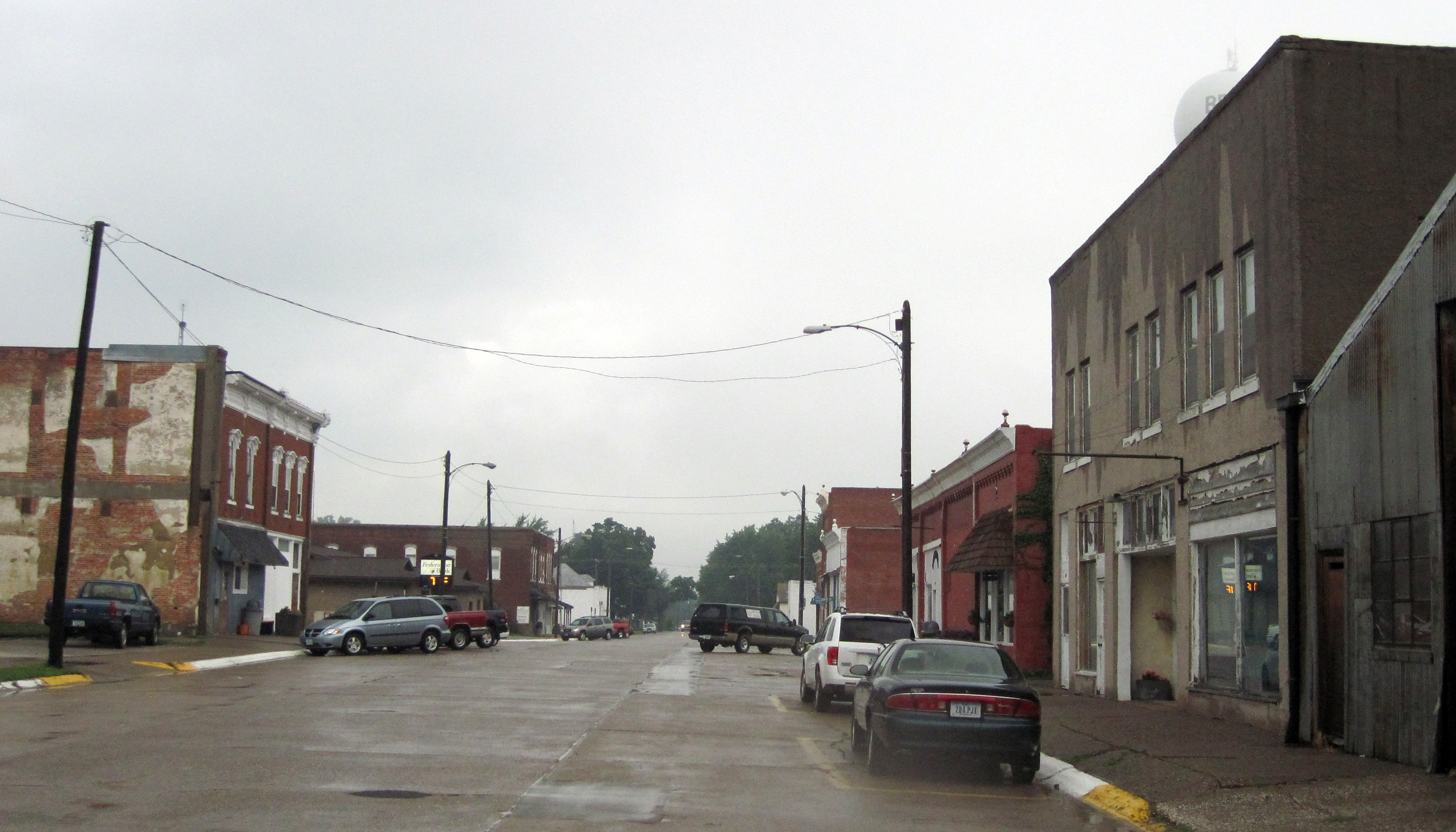
- Downtown Brighton
- Motto: Home of Lake Darling State Park
- Location of Brighton, Iowa
- Coordinates: 41°10′29″N 91°49′16″W
- Country: United States
- State: Iowa
- County: Washington
- Incorporated: July 26, 1870

Government
  - Mayor: Melvin Rich

Area
  - Total: 0.78 sq mi (2.03 km^{2})
  - Land: 0.78 sq mi (2.03 km^{2})
  - Water: 0 sq mi (0.00 km^{2})
- Elevation: 751 ft (229 m)

Population (2020)
  - Total: 600
  - Density: 767.0/sq mi (296.15/km^{2})
- Time zone: UTC-6 (Central (CST))
  - Summer (DST): UTC-5 (CDT)
- ZIP code: 52540
- Area code: 319
- FIPS code: 19-08470
- GNIS feature ID: 2393419
- Website: www.brightoniowa.com

Brighton is a city in Washington County, Iowa, United States. It is part of the Iowa City, Iowa Metropolitan Statistical Area. The population was 600 at the 2020 census.

== History ==
Brighton was laid out in 1840. During the 1840s and 1850 quickly developed into one of the largest centres of hog production west of the Mississippi. In 1851, David Powers discovered the fossil remains of a Mastodon. The fossil was three and a half feet long, fourteen inches wide at the larger end, and weighed eighty-three pounds. In 1854 Brighton was sorely afflicted by the Cholera.

In 1882, the Iowa Central Railway and the narrow-gauge Burlington and Western Railway battled for right-of-way as they built west from Coppock toward Brighton. At several points, crews for the rival railroads tore up tracks the other had put down. The line through Brighton was originally platted as a street, 3 blocks south of the business district. The B&W reached Brighton in mid 1882 and claimed the entire street as its right-of way. After vandalism, arrests and court battles, the two lines built parallel tracks down the street (with the B&W claiming the center line) to their crossing west of town. This has been described as the Brighton Railroad War. Both lines crossed the Chicago, Rock Island and Pacific Railroad on the east side of town. The Burlington and Western was later widened and taken over by the Chicago, Burlington and Quincy and the Iowa Central was taken over by the Minneapolis and St. Louis.

There were three railroad depots in town. The Burlington and Western (after 1902, the Chicago, Burlington and Quincy) depot was on the east side of town, at the south end of Liberty St. The Iowa Central (after 1901, the Minneapolis and St. Louis) depot was on the west side, between Mechanic St. and Harrison St. The Rock Island depot was several blocks south, also between Mechanic and Harrison. The Rock Island had a stockyard west of its depot, while the Burlington and Western stockyard was east of its depot.

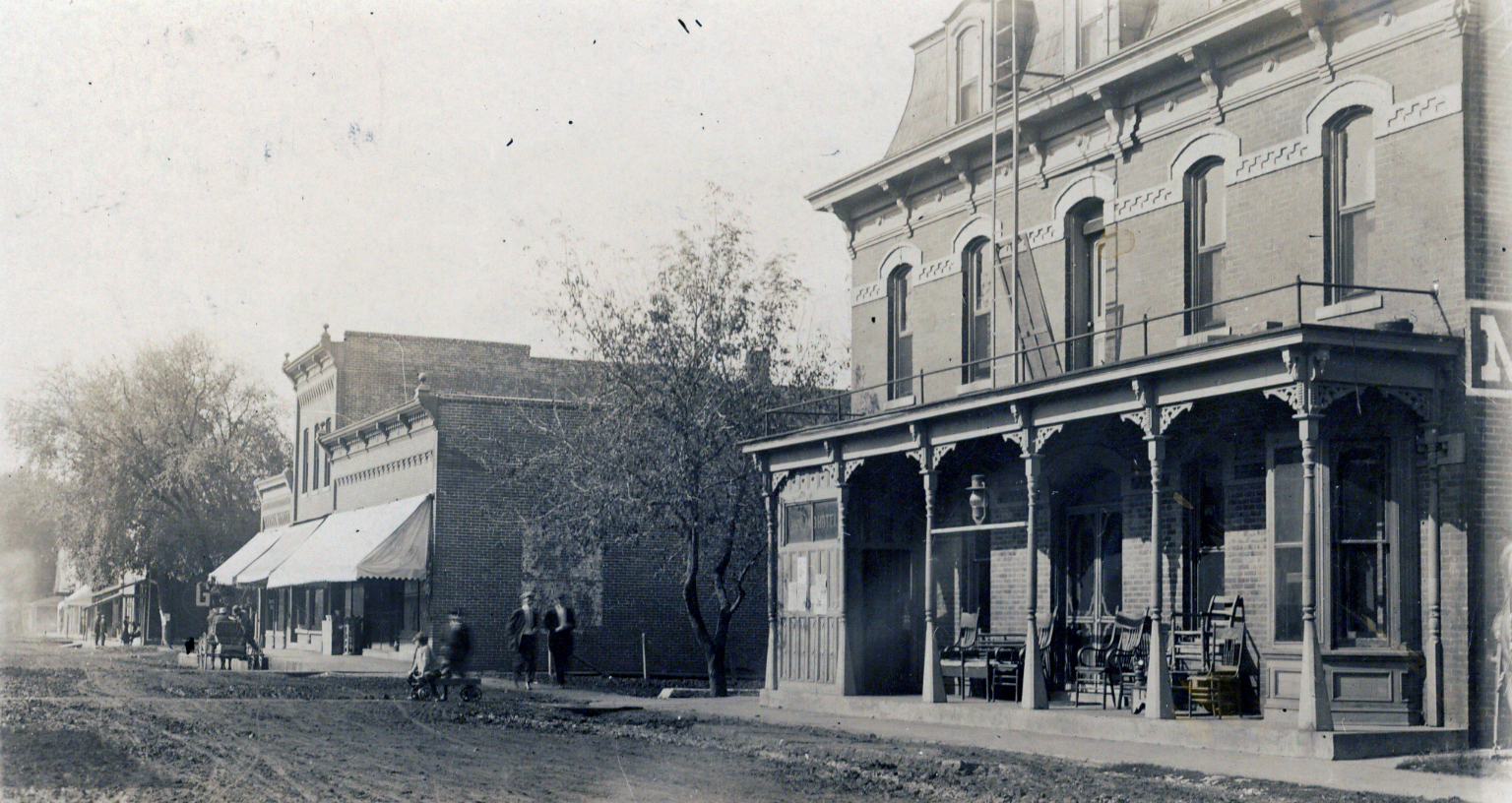
Mainstreet, 1917

== Geography ==
According to the United States Census Bureau, the city has a total area of 0.71 square miles (1.84 km^{2}), all of it land.

Brighton is located where Iowa State Road 78 and Iowa State Road 1 meet and is located near the Skunk River and near Lake Darling State Park.

=== Climate ===
Climate data for Brighton, Iowa (1991-2020 normals)
Month	Jan	Feb	Mar	Apr	May	Jun	Jul	Aug	Sep	Oct	Nov	Dec	Year
Average precipitation inches (mm)	1.44 (37)	1.65 (42)	2.48 (63)	3.63 (92)	5.11 (130)	5.03 (128)	3.97 (101)	4.28 (109)	3.60 (91)	3.04 (77)	2.30 (58)	1.75 (44)	38.28 (972)
Average snowfall inches (cm)	8.8 (22)	9.9 (25)	4.2 (11)	0.9 (2.3)	0.0 (0.0)	0.0 (0.0)	0.0 (0.0)	0.0 (0.0)	0.0 (0.0)	0.1 (0.25)	1.8 (4.6)	8.4 (21)	34.1 (86.15)
Average precipitation days (≥ 0.01 in)	8.0	7.5	8.3	9.9	12.0	11.2	8.7	8.8	7.5	7.9	7.1	7.9	104.8
Average snowy days (≥ 0.01 in)	5.2	4.5	2.1	0.4	0	0	0	0	0	0.1	1.0	3.9	17.2
Source: NOAA

== Demographics ==
Historical populations
Year	Pop.	±%
1870	785	—
1880	836	+6.5%
1890	861	+3.0%
1900	807	−6.3%
1910	776	−3.8%
1920	1,014	+30.7%
1930	800	−21.1%
1940	791	−1.1%
1950	705	−10.9%
1960	724	+2.7%
1970	632	−12.7%
1980	804	+27.2%
1990	684	−14.9%
2000	687	+0.4%
2010	652	−5.1%
2020	600	−8.0%
Source:"U.S. Census website". United States Census Bureau. and Iowa Data Center; Source: U.S. Decennial Census

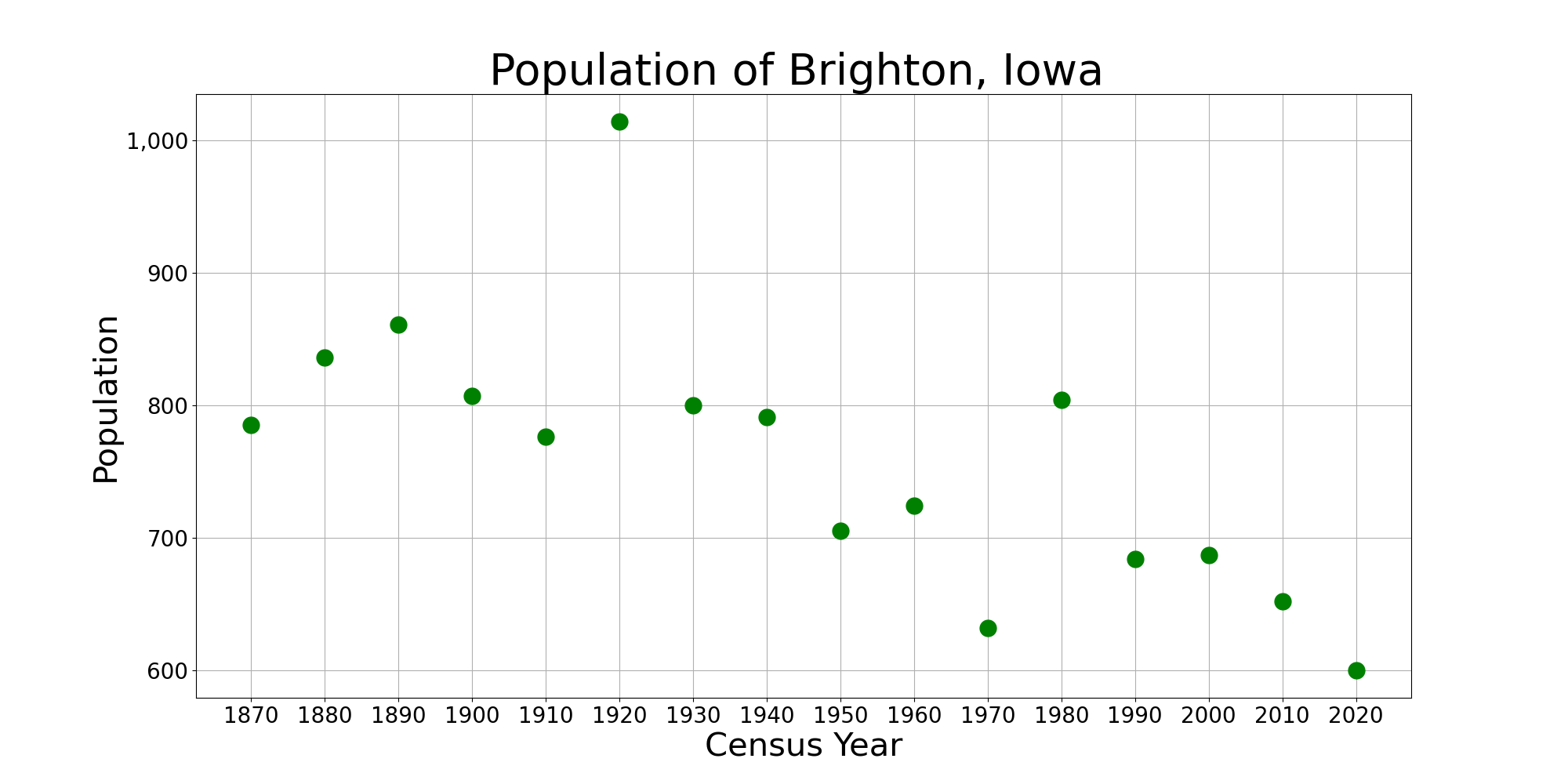
The population of Brighton, Iowa from US census data

=== 2020 census ===
As of the census of 2020, there were 600 people, 257 households, and 161 families residing in the city. The population density was 767.0 inhabitants per square mile (296.2/km^{2}). There were 279 housing units at an average density of 356.7 per square mile (137.7/km^{2}). The racial makeup of the city was 94.2% White, 0.0% Black or African American, 0.7% Native American, 0.5% Asian, 0.0% Pacific Islander, 0.8% from other races and 3.8% from two or more races. Hispanic or Latino persons of any race comprised 3.0% of the population.

Of the 257 households, 29.6% of which had children under the age of 18 living with them, 44.0% were married couples living together, 8.2% were cohabitating couples, 23.7% had a female householder with no spouse or partner present and 24.1% had a male householder with no spouse or partner present. 37.4% of all households were non-families. 31.5% of all households were made up of individuals, 11.3% had someone living alone who was 65 years old or older.

The median age in the city was 39.4 years. 27.3% of the residents were under the age of 20; 4.3% were between the ages of 20 and 24; 24.8% were from 25 and 44; 26.8% were from 45 and 64; and 16.7% were 65 years of age or older. The gender makeup of the city was 51.3% male and 48.7% female.

=== 2010 census ===
As of the census of 2010, there were 652 people, 269 households, and 178 families living in the city. The population density was 918.3 inhabitants per square mile (354.6/km^{2}). There were 295 housing units at an average density of 415.5 per square mile (160.4/km^{2}). The racial makeup of the city was 98.8% White, 0.3% African American, 0.2% Native American, 0.2% Asian, 0.2% Pacific Islander, and 0.5% from two or more races. Hispanic or Latino of any race were 2.8% of the population.

There were 269 households, of which 29.7% had children under the age of 18 living with them, 48.0% were married couples living together, 12.6% had a female householder with no husband present, 5.6% had a male householder with no wife present, and 33.8% were non-families. 27.5% of all households were made up of individuals, and 8.5% had someone living alone who was 65 years of age or older. The average household size was 2.42 and the average family size was 2.87.

The median age in the city was 39.5 years. 23.6% of residents were under the age of 18; 8% were between the ages of 18 and 24; 24.2% were from 25 to 44; 27.3% were from 45 to 64; and 16.9% were 65 years of age or older. The gender makeup of the city was 50.9% male and 49.1% female.

=== 2000 census ===
As of the census of 2000, there were 687 people, 285 households, and 190 families living in the city. The population density was 955.3 inhabitants per square mile (368.8/km^{2}). There were 302 housing units at an average density of 419.9 per square mile (162.1/km^{2}). The racial makeup of the city was 99.27% White, 0.44% African American and 0.29% Pacific Islander. Hispanic or Latino of any race were 0.29% of the population.

There were 285 households, out of which 29.5% had children under the age of 18 living with them, 51.2% were married couples living together, 8.4% had a female householder with no husband present, and 33.3% were non-families. 28.4% of all households were made up of individuals, and 13.0% had someone living alone who was 65 years of age or older. The average household size was 2.41 and the average family size was 2.92.

In the city, the population was spread out, with 25.6% under the age of 18, 8.2% from 18 to 24, 28.5% from 25 to 44, 24.6% from 45 to 64, and 13.1% who were 65 years of age or older. The median age was 37 years. For every 100 females, there were 98.0 males. For every 100 females age 18 and over, there were 97.3 males.

The median income for a household in the city was $30,139, and the median income for a family was $35,781. Males had a median income of $27,450 versus $20,938 for females. The per capita income for the city was $15,140. About 8.9% of families and 14.1% of the population were below the poverty line, including 12.3% of those under age 18 and 21.8% of those age 65 or over.

== Education ==
The Washington Community School District operates local area schools, including Washington High School.

== Notable residents ==
- Francis W. Cushman, U.S. Representative from Washington
- William Ward Johnson, U.S. Representative from California
- Mila Tupper Maynard, Unitarian minister
- Ellen Smith Tupper, American apiarist and first female editor of an entomological journal
