= Allen Tupper True =

American illustrator and painter (1881-1955)

- Allen Tupper True in 1908
- Born: May 30, 1881; Colorado Springs, Colorado
- Died: November 1, 1955 (aged 74); Denver, Colorado
- Education: Corcoran School of Art in Washington, D.C.; Howard Pyle School in Wilmington DE & Chadds Ford, PA; apprenticeship with Frank Brangwyn in London, England.
- Known for: Painting, Illustration, Mural
- Style: Brandywine School

Allen Tupper True (May 30, 1881 – November 1, 1955) was an American illustrator, easel painter and muralist who specialized in depicting the American West.

== Biography ==
Allen Tupper True was born May 30, 1881, in Colorado Springs, Colorado, the son of Margaret Allen Tupper and Henry Alfonso True, both of New England parentage. His maternal grandmother was beekeeper Ellen Smith Tupper; his aunts included two Unitarian ministers, Eliza Tupper Wilkes and Mila Tupper Maynard, and an educator, Kate Tupper Galpin.

His father, Henry True, was a pioneer who had fought against the secession of Texas with Sam Houston, driven cattle on the trail from Abilene to Montana, and had established a mercantile and freight business in Colorado Springs catering to the headlong mining rush pushing west into the mountains. His mother, Margaret True, was to become a noted educator, serving first as a teacher in Colorado Springs and later as President of the Denver School Board and head of the truancy department. She also founded the first kindergarten in El Paso, TX, and was instrumental in establishing in Denver what may have been the first juvenile court in the US.

True spent his childhood in Texas and Mexico before the family settled in Denver, Colorado. He graduated from Manual Training High School in Denver and spent two years at the University of Denver before studying at the Corcoran School of Art in Washington, DC. True then spent 1902-1907 at the prestigious Howard Pyle School in Wilmington, DE and Chadds Ford, PA. The Pyle School primarily readied students to become illustrators and whose alumni include Harvey Dunn, Philip R. Goodwin, Gayle Hoskins, Thornton Oakley, Frank E. Schoonover, and N. C. Wyeth. In the Fall of 1908, True went to London to study art and within a short time was asked by the eminent muralist Frank Brangwyn to work as his assistant on murals for Skinners Hall in London. In 1915, True married Emma Goodman Eaton in Colorado Springs. They had four children: Frank in 1916, Jere in 1919, Edith in 1926 and Allen, Jr. in 1928.

Allen Tupper True died November 1, 1955, and was buried in Evergreen Cemetery in Colorado Springs.

He was a member of the distinguished National Society of Mural Painters, whose members included John Singer Sargent and Edwin Abbey, and he was also a Fellow of England's Royal Society of the Arts.

== Work ==
Homesteaders, one of 8 murals painted in 1917 for the Wyoming State Capitol

While at the Pyle School and later in Boston, True provided illustrations for magazines such as the Saturday Evening Post, Outing, Collier's Weekly, Scribners Magazine and Art and Progress, to name a few; and books such as Clarence E. Mulford's The Orphan, Robert Ames Bennet's Into the Primitive and epic poem The Song of the Indian Wars by John G. Neihardt. True created easel paintings throughout his life, depicting his beloved West and its peoples. In 1912, True sold Free Trappers, a large easel painting, to Anne Evans, daughter of then Governor Evans, which she installed as a mural at her mountain cabin. True then acquired contracts for murals in various branches of the Denver Public Library (1912–13).

In March 1913, Frank Brangwyn asked True to return to London to work on his murals to decorate the Court of Abundance at the Panama Pacific International Exposition in San Francisco. In July 1914, True returned to US (just missing World War One) to install Brangwyn's murals. He also was hired by Union Oil to create a panorama and model for the company's exhibit at the same Exposition. (The Panama Pacific International Exhibition opened in February 1915. Brangwyn murals are now installed in the Herbst Theatre of the War Memorial Building in San Francisco.)

True's career as a muralist began when he received his first big assignment in 1917 to paint eight panels for the Wyoming State Capitol, which he finished in 1918. The Senate and the House of Representatives chambers of the Wyoming State Capitol Building each contain four large murals by True. He began painting them during the summer of 1917. True created the four Senate murals for $500.00 each and the four House murals for $800.00 each. The murals depict various aspects of the culture, history, and industry of Wyoming. The murals in the Senate chamber are entitled "Indian Chief Cheyenne", "Frontier Cavalry Officer", "Pony Express Rider", and "Railroad Builders/Surveyors". The House murals are entitled "Cattlemen", "Trappers", "Homesteaders", and "Stagecoach". He later painted 16 murals for the Missouri State Capitol (1922–25) and eight murals for the Colorado State Capitol (1934–40). He also painted murals in many public buildings in Denver, Colorado, including Mountain States Telephone & Telegraph (now Qwest), US National Bank (destroyed), Children's Hospital (in storage), Colorado National Bank (now owned by Stonebridge Cos which has turned the building into a Marriott Renaissance hotel), South High School, Steele Elementary School, and the Greek Theatre and Voorhies Memorial at the Civic Center. True also painted murals for the Colorado Springs Nursery School, and murals for private homes and businesses in and around Denver (i.e. Jonas Brothers Furriers, and Dr. James Waring & Judge Stanley Johnson residences).

=== Colorado National Bank Building Murals ===
Happy Hunting Ground, 1925, mural in Colorado National Bank

In 1916 the prominent Denver architectural firm Fisher & Fisher designed the Colorado National Bank Building. In 1924 another prestigious firm, Hoyt & Hoyt added on to the building. Part of the later addition involved the installation of a series of murals collectively called Indian Memories. These murals recall the days of the Indian before his contact with the white race – days when he roamed the untouched reaches of the West. Costing $18,000, the murals consisted of five triptychs, each showing a different aspect of native life. These are Youth, Buffalo Hunt, War, Women, and Art Work. The series concludes with a much larger mural, Happy Hunting Ground. The works were much commented on in the press at the time and were unveiled with much fanfare in 1925.

Allen True also restored the murals and decorations in the Central City Opera House, which reopened on July 16, 1932. In 1934, True was asked by Secretary of State of Wyoming Lester C. Hunt to undertake the job of designing the familiar symbol of the bucking horse and rider which is still used on Wyoming's vehicle license plates. Also in 1934, True also was hired as Consulting Artist for the U.S. Bureau of Reclamation to lay out color schemes and create decorations for major power houses at the giant dams being built during the Thirties and early Forties (Hoover, Grand Coulee, Bonneville, Shasta, Friant and Minidoka). For Hoover Dam, True based his designs on Native American pottery and sand paintings in their decoration. In 1942, The Bureau of Reclamation sent him to camouflage school in Washington, D.C., where he drew up plans to hide America's huge dams from the country's wartime enemies.

In spite of a debilitating stroke suffered in the early Fifties, True completed one more mural; an exuberant depiction of a Native American eagle dance for the University of Colorado Student Union Building in Boulder (which is now owned by the Koshare Indian Museum in La Junta).

True was recognized as an authority on Indian design, costume and artifacts, as well as on the lives of westerners such as the cowboy, trapper, explorer, prospector, construction worker and farmer who are depicted in his numerous murals and easel paintings.

=== Brown Palace Hotel Murals ===
Airplane Travel, 1937, one of two murals made for the Brown Palace Hotel, in Denver, Colorado

In 1931 True began discussing creating a series of transportation themed murals with Charles Boettcher, then the owner of the Brown Palace Hotel in Denver. However True was having a difficult time finding a space to work in, but eventually found a studio that he could use in the Corcoran School of Art in Washington D.C., where he had studied years earlier. It was while doing these works that he discovered that he was allergic to turpentine, and this allowed him to clear up a long-standing skin problem that he had suffered from for many years by never painting with oils again. His two murals, Stagecoach Travel and Airplane Travel, were installed in 1937.

=== Exhibits ===
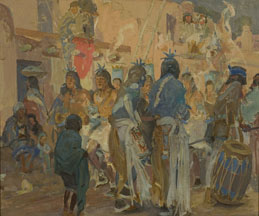
Santo Domingo Corn Dancers, c. 1915, oil on canvas.

True had his first one-man show in Denver in November 1908 and his second and third exhibition of paintings at the Denver Public Library in 1910 and 1912. From 1913–1923, exhibitions of his work traveled to over 21 cities across the United States. In 1931, True's murals for Denver's Mountain Telephone & Telegraph building were exhibited at the Architectural and Allied Arts Exposition in New York City. In 1947, the Denver Art Museum showed a collection of True's mural studies and easel paintings. An easel painting was included in The Western Legend exhibit at Kennedy Galleries in New York City in 1956.

Denver Art Museum's Petrie Institute of Western American Art, Denver Public Library's Western History/Genealogy Department, and the Colorado History Museum, mounted a three-part retrospective exhibition, titled Allen True's West, featuring True's illustrations, easel paintings and murals from October 2009 through March 30, 2010. A smaller combined exhibition toured to three U. S. museums. Denver's Colorado Public Television – KBDI-PBS produced an hour-long documentary on Allen Tupper True's life, times and artistic achievements, also titled Allen True’s West, which began airing in October 2009 and also is available on DVD.

True's portrait of Abraham Lincoln is in the collection of the Huntington Library in San Marino, California, and is usually on exhibit.
