= Colorado National Bank Building =

Historic building in Denver, Colorado

- U.S. National Register of Historic Places
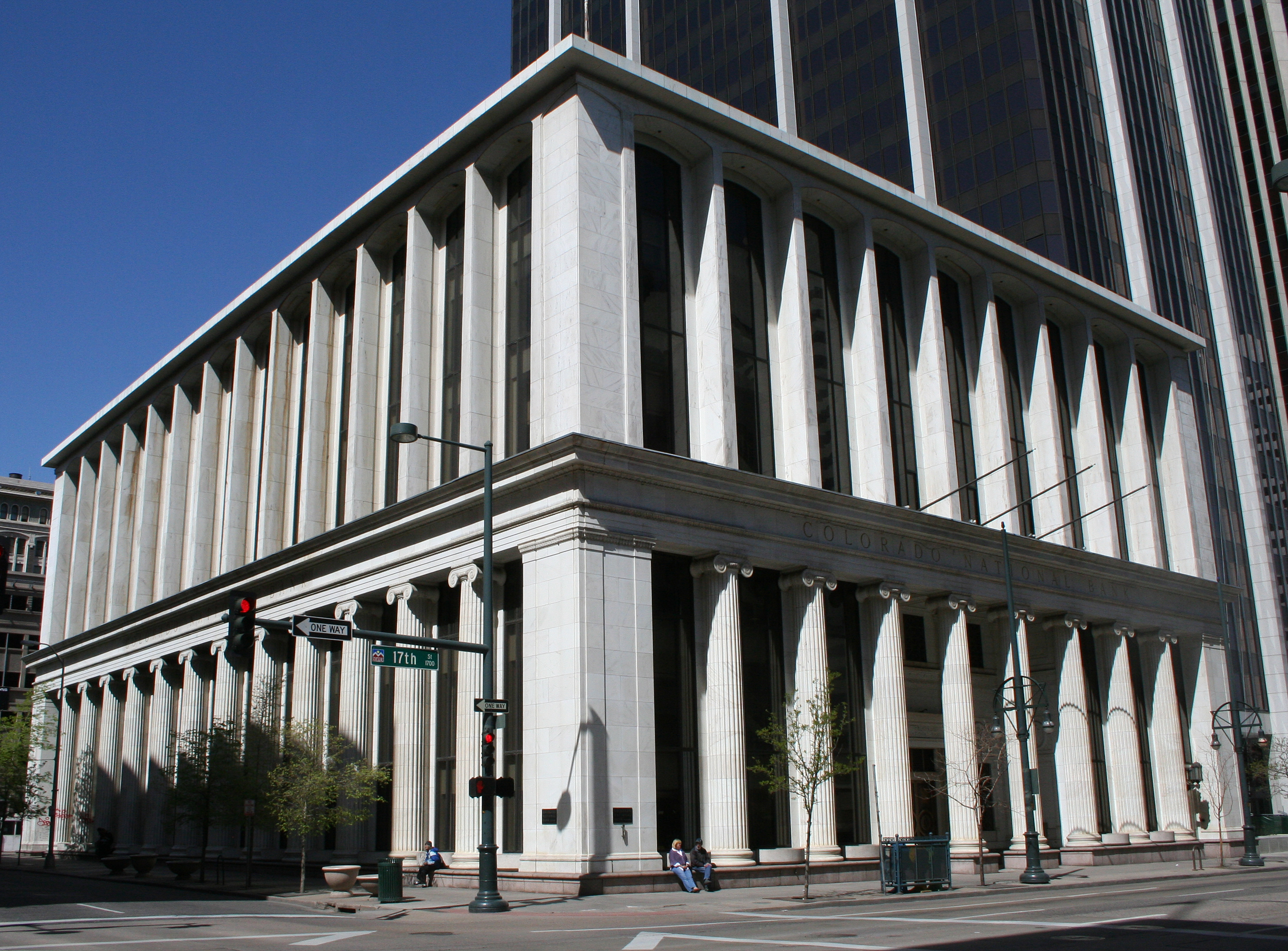

- Location within Colorado Location within the United States
- Location: Denver, Colorado
- Built: 1915
- NRHP reference No.: 10000215
- Added to NRHP: April 27, 2010

Located in the Downtown Denver Historic District, the Colorado National Bank Building was designed by Denver architects William E. and Arthur A. Fisher and constructed in 1915. It is located at 918 17th Street, the intersection of 17th and Champa Streets. On April 27, 2010, it was added to the National Register of Historic Places.

== Colorado National Bank ==
In 1862, Luther Kountze expanded the successful Kountze Brothers Bank of Omaha, Nebraska to Denver, Colorado, under the name Kountze Brothers Bank, Denver. Two years later, his brother Charles Kountze joined him in Denver. The bank was known for its 1,800 pound safe, which had taken thirty-five days for twelve oxen to pull from Omaha, Nebraska to Denver, Colorado. In 1866, Luther and Charles converted their bank into the Colorado National Bank, with Luther serving as the first president. Charles took over as president in 1874.

Over the years, the Colorado National Bank absorbed other banks, including Bank Western and Central Banks. It had two other homes before moving into the building now known as the Colorado National Bank building at 17th and Champa Streets.

In 1998, Colorado National Bank was purchased by US Bank, which continued to occupy the building until 2007. At the time of its acquisition, Colorado National Bank was one of the last locally owned banks in Colorado.

== Building Design ==
In 1915, the Colorado National Bank’s slogan was “a bank that looks like a bank,” and the neoclassical structure was designed to do just that. A historic medallion on the structure reads: “The Colorado National Bank Building epitomizes the concept of Wall Street of the West. The white marble bank with Corinthian columns, a lofty arcade and a vault with three-and-a-half inches thick doors conveyed a feeling of majesty and security. It was strategically designed to be ‘the bank that looks like a bank’ to attract Wall Street investors looking venture into Denver’s economic boom.”

The building’s bronze vault and door weighed 73,000 pounds, with support walls three-and-a-half inches thick. Inside the vaults, the doors alone weigh 62,000 pounds.

=== Renovation ===
Following the departure of US Bank in 2007, the Colorado National Bank building stood vacant. In 2009, it was purchased by developer and hospitality firm Stonebridge Companies, which began renovations in 2011 to turn it into a 230-room hotel. The total project cost was $48 million. It opened in May 2014 as the Renaissance Denver Downtown City Center Hotel.

The building was originally four stories high. It was expanded in 1925 (by architects Merrill and Burnham Hoyt), in the 1960s, and again during Stonebridge’s 2011-2014 renovation. The building is now eight stories high.

Stonebridge renovated the ground floor into a restaurant and lounge. Three bank vaults were preserved along with their functioning 62,000 pound vault doors, (designed by Frederick S. Holmes) and their interiors were renovated into private meeting spaces.

=== Indian Memories Murals ===
The renovation project included a restoration of 16 murals on the ground floor by one of Colorado’s premier native born artists, Allen Tupper True.

Painted in 1923-1925, the Indian Memories cycle of murals includes five triptychs—Youth, The Buffalo Hunt, War, Girlhood Beckoning, and The Bead Worker — and a large single mural—Happy Hunting Ground. The images depict the everyday life of Native Americans, including women and children.
