= National Bee Journal =

- Editor: N. C. Mitchell
- Editor: Ellen Smith Tupper (1873–1874)
- Corresponding editor: L. C. Waite
- Corresponding editor: A. J. Pope
- Corresponding editor: Mrs. Thomas Atkinson
- First issue: 1870
- Final issue: 1874

The National Bee Journal was a monthly periodical that was published from 1870 to 1874 and which was exclusively devoted to the culture of the honey bee. The first two volumes were published under the titles Indianapolis Illustrated Bee Journal and Indianapolis National Bee Journal. In November 1873 the printing office of the journal relocated from Indianapolis to Des Moines, where Ellen Smith Tupper became its editor and proprietor. It therefore became one of the first journals in the field of biology that had a woman as editor in chief. In 1874 the journal ceased publication and it was consolidated with the American Bee Journal, which at the time was the only other existing nationwide periodical on beekeeping in the United States.

Editors:

- N. C. Mitchell
- Ellen Smith Tupper (1873–1874)

Corresponding editors:

- L. C. Waite
- A. J. Pope
- Mrs. Thomas Atkinson
