= Belle Reynolds =

American Civil War nurse

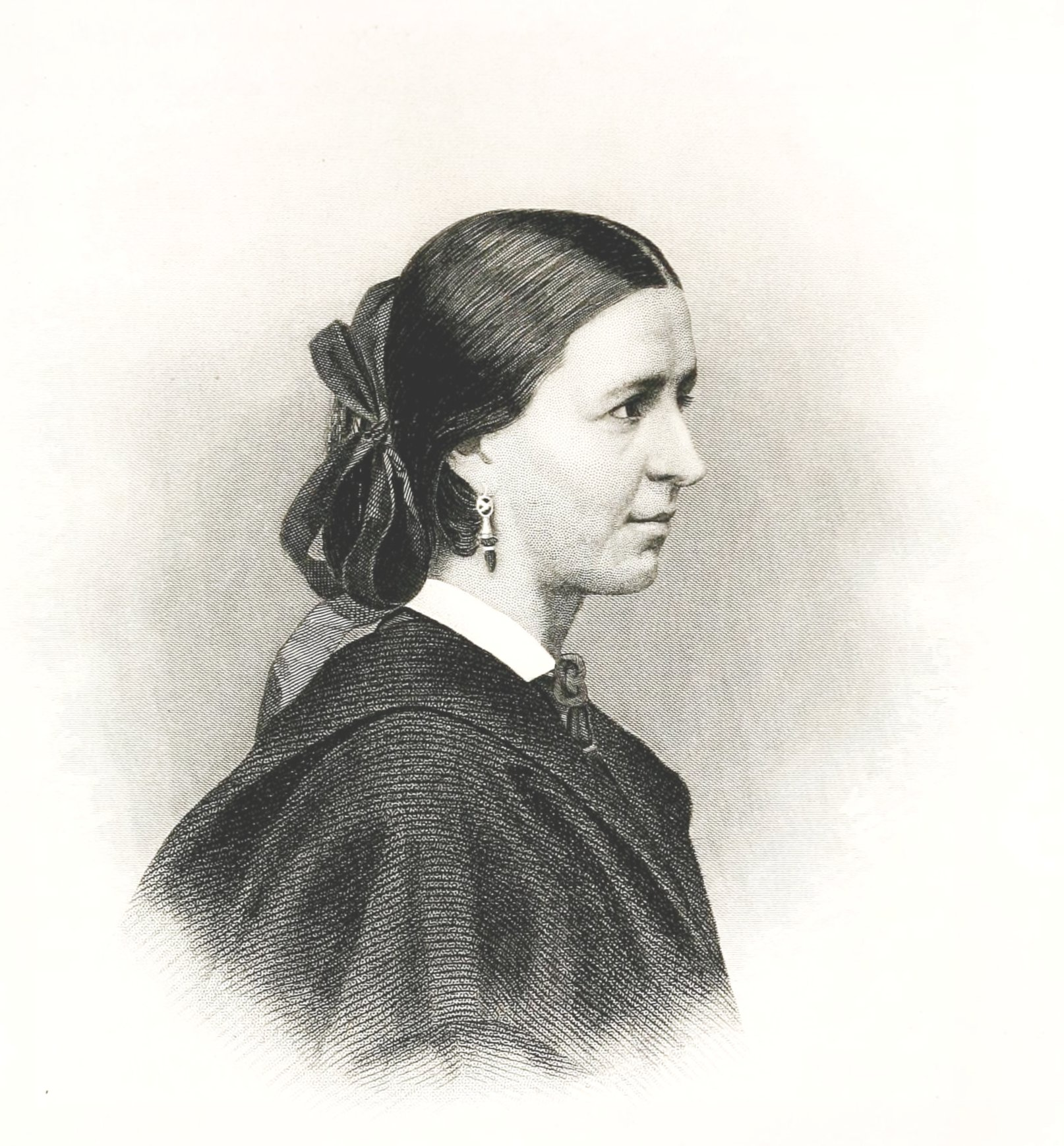
- Portrait of Belle Reynolds
- Born: Arabella Loomis Macomber; October 20, 1840; Shelburne Falls, Massachusetts
- Died: July 28, 1937 (aged 96); Santa Barbara, California
- Education: Hahnemann College
- Occupations: Army nurse; Physician; Teacher
- Board member of: Woman's Parliament of Southern California, President (1898)
- Medical career
- Profession: Medical doctor
- Field: Pediatrics and women’s medicine
- Institutions: Home for the Friendless
- Military career
- Spouse: Lt. William S. Reynolds (m. 1860; div. 1884)
- Allegiance: United States (Union)
- Branch: United States Army (Union)
- Service years: 1861-1864
- Rank: Major
- Unit: Seventeenth Illinois Volunteer Regiment
- Commands: American Civil War
- Known for: First woman major in the United States Army
- Conflicts: American Civil War; Battle of Fredericktown; Battle of Shiloh; Battle of Fort Henry; Battle of Fort Donelson; Siege of Vicksburg; Philippine–American War (Red Cross nurse); Battle of Manila

Arabella Loomis Macomber Reynolds (née Macomber; October 20, 1840 – July 28, 1937), better known as Belle Reynolds, was an American Civil War nurse, physician, and woman's club leader.

Reynolds joined her husband Lieutenant William S. Reynolds who was enlisted with the Seventeenth Illinois Volunteer Regiment and traveled with him to battle during the American Civil War. She became a heroine because of her involvement in the Battle of Shiloh, where Belle helped the wounded soldiers.

== Early life and family ==
Belle Macomber was born in Shelburne Falls, Massachusetts. Thence, her family removed to Iowa, where the young girl had many pioneer experiences. Returning East to complete her education, she afterward became a school teacher in the then wilderness of Cass County, Iowa. Marrying, in 1860, Mr. Reynolds of Illinois, she removed to Peoria, where on the anniversary of her wedding she heard the news of the firing upon Fort Sumter.

== Civil War service ==
A few months later, she was with her husband, following the fortunes of war, in the Seventeenth Illinois. Reynolds was eighteen years old at the time. She arrived at the camp on August 11, 1861, and after three days of convincing the regiment's colonel, headed to the front with them.

From that time until the close of the war, she experienced the genuine hardships of a soldier's life — sleeping upon the ground, sometimes with the luxury of a blanket, grateful when hardtack was obtainable, going sometimes for a week at a time without a night's sleep while she nursed the sick, attended the wounded, comforted the dying. Reynolds moved with the regiment, sometimes marching beside the troops. With the regiment, she traveled to the Mississippi River with General Grant's campaigns at Fort Henry and Fort Donelson. It was not alone for her courageous defense of a transport of wounded soldiers, but for devoted service upon all occasions, that she was singled out by Gov. Yates, who presented her with the title of Major. The commission bore the note, “Given to Mrs. Belle Reynolds for meritorious conduct in camp and on the bloody field of Shiloh, as daughter of the regiment, with the rank of Major." The governor afterward presented her with a beautiful horse. She entered Vicksburg with the victorious troops and remained with her regiment until it was mustered out in 1864.

== Life after the war ==
At the close of the war, she began the study of medicine and surgery, which she practiced thereafter, being for years on the clinical staff of Hahnemann College, in Chicago. She was a member of the American Institute of Homeopathy, the Clinical Society of Hahnemann, and an honorary member of the Connecticut River Valley Medical Society of Massachusetts. Reynolds traveled much in Europe and the Far East, including with the Red Cross to the Philippines during the Philippine–American War. She continued practicing her profession in Santa Barbara, California where she became allied with progressive movements of the day. She served as President of the Woman's Parliament of Southern California in 1898.

Dr. Belle Reynolds died in Santa Barbara, California, on July 28, 1937, the Associated Press reported her death on the same day, identifying her as the "first woman major in the United States army."
