= Woman's Parliament of Southern California =

Woman's Parliament of Southern California was established in Los Angeles in 1892. Kate Tupper Galpin served as president for several years.

== History ==
The idea of a Woman's Parliament was originated by Rev. Lila Sprague of Pomona, and carried out by area women in the cause of reform for the Church, the home and society. In October 1892, at a Unitarian conference held at Santa Ana, it was suggested that local clubs for women be formed in different parts of Southern California, to meet quarterly in Los Angeles, making that a common center, to which all might come for new ideas and fresh inspirations, and from which all might carry strength, hope and usefulness to each individual society. A committee was appointed to develop such an organization. The committee reached the conclusion that the federation of all church, charitable, reform, literary and art societies in one general association for the discussion of topics of special interest to women, and for the furtherance of their social and practical usefulness, was more desirable and helpful than the largest and most complete denominational alliance, and it was decided to make the new society as broad as the women who should respond to the call would permit.

== 1892 ==
On submitting the constitution and by-laws, it was unanimously decided to throw aside all questions of creed and to make the parliament essentially a woman's organization; to hold only annual meetings at Los Angeles, and the quarterly sessions at different points in Southern California. The audience of the first parliament was a representative one, and brought to the aid of the movement the best women of all religious belief. In the multiplicity of duties that present themselves, not forgetting those of the family and the home, it was important to discuss and decide on the best work women do, and what must be left undone, and also how women can improve on old methods. All women were welcome at the parliament, and all in sympathy with its object were invited to join.

In the afternoon, the first paper was by Louise T. W. Conger of Pasadena, on "Heredity and Environment." The next paper was by Mariha S. H. Bent of Pasadena, on "The Duty of Christian Women to Society." The second day, the church was again filled. The first paper, on "Woman and Business," was by Harriet W. R. Strong. The next paper was entitled "Cupid Reformed," and was contributed by Rev. Florence Lounsberry Pierce, lately from Iowa. The paper of the afternoon was "Equity, Not Privilege," presented by Mrs. W. A. Spalding. The closing hour of the parliament was devoted to business, and complimentary resolutions were passed thanking Kate Tupper Galpin for the discussions, and also congratulating her upon the honor of the appointment to represent "Woman in the Pulpit" at the World's Congress in Chicago the following May. When the parliament formally adjourned, it was agreed to meet again in May.

== 1893 ==
The second session of the Woman's Parliament of Southern California was held at Pasadena on February 15-16, 1893. It was attended by 500 women of various creeds and varied social condition meeting for an earnest discussion of the questions that concern them as women. The meeting was held in the Universalist Church, and opened with prayer by Rev. Florence Kollock, the recently elected assistant pastor. Galpin was the first speaker, her subject being "How to Get the Most out of the Parliament." The President, Mrs. D. G. Stephens, made an address outlining clearly what the parliament was for and what it proposed to do.

== 1898 ==
At the session held at Redlands, April 26-27, 1898, a wide field was covered, with sessions important in the intellectual life of club women. The Contemporary Club of Redlands, which served as hostess to the Parliament, was organized in January, 1894, with 25 members, Mrs. H. D. Moore, President, and Mrs. K. N. Field, Secretary. The membership was at first limited to 25, and after two years enlarged to 30. In the spring of 1896, an important change was made by which the doors of the club were thrown open to all the women of Redlands, and the membership made unlimited. Since that time, it steadily increased in numbers until there were over 100 names on the list of active members. Belle Reynolds was president of the parliament in 1898.

== Bibliography ==
- Onward Club of the First Unitarian Church (1891). The Guidon (Public domain ed.). Onward Club of the First Unitarian Church.
- Pattee, F. A. (1898). Out West: A Magazine of the Old Pacific and the New (Public domain ed.). F. A. Pattee & Company.
