= Sonia Marie De León de Vega =

American orchestral conductor (born 1964)

- Born: October 16, 1964; San Antonio, Texas, U.S.
- Genres: Classical, Latin American
- Occupation: Orchestral conductor
- Website: deleondevega.com

Sonia Marie De León de Vega (born October 16, 1964) is an American orchestral conductor. She teaches at Occidental College in Eagle Rock, Los Angeles, and is conductor of the Los Angeles Santa Cecilia Orchestra, which she founded in 1992.

== Early life and career ==
De León was born in San Antonio, Texas, to Reynaldo Sanchez, a musician, and Sonia De León, a dancer. The family moved to Los Angeles when Sonia Marie was four, and she grew up in Echo Park. She studied piano and organ at California State University, Los Angeles, and graduated in 1984. After an MA in instrumental music and conducting under David Buck in 1986, she went to the Herbert Blomstedt International Institute for Instrumental Conductors at Loma Linda, California. She attended workshops of the American Symphony Orchestra League, under conductors such as Maurice Abravanel, Pierre Boulez, Zubin Mehta and André Previn.

In 1986, De León was invited to conduct a Papal Mass at St. Peter's, in the Vatican City in Rome; she was the second person, and the first woman, to receive such an invitation. She worked as a conductor of local opera companies, and as a guest conductor in Italy and Mexico.

== Santa Cecilia Orchestra ==
De León started the Santa Cecilia Orchestra in 1992, using money of her own. Only 12 people attended the orchestra's first concert. The orchestra now numbers 85 paid professional performers. It performs both mainstream classical repertoire and works by Latin American composers such as Daniel Catán and Silvestre Revueltas. Its two-year music education program, Discovering Music, was started in 1998 and is currently offered in 16 elementary schools throughout Los Angeles.
