= Lloy Galpin =

American educator, clubwoman, suffragist, temperance activist and politician

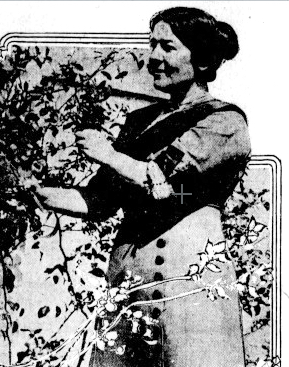
- Lloy Galpin, from a 1912 publication.
- Born: Ava Lloy Galpin; 1877; Michigan
- Died: April 19, 1935 (aged 57–58); Los Angeles, California
- Occupation: teacher
- Known for: suffrage, temperance, politics, clubwork

Ava Lloy Galpin (1877 – April 19, 1935) was an American educator, clubwoman, suffragist, temperance activist, and politician, based in Southern California.

== Early life ==
Ava Lloy Galpin was born in Saginaw, Michigan, and raised in Los Angeles, the daughter of Cromwell Galpin and Clara Wood Galpin. Her father was mayor of Eagle Rock from 1914 to 1916, before it became part of Los Angeles. Her mother died in 1888. Her stepmother after 1890 was educator and suffragist Kate Tupper Galpin. Lloy Galpin graduated from the University of Wisconsin–Madison and the University of California, Berkeley.

== Career ==
Galpin taught at a school and at a teacher's college in the Philippines in 1903. She taught in Los Angeles city schools from 1905, and was active for many years in the California Teachers' Association. In 1909 she lectured on Los Angeles at the Alaska–Yukon–Pacific Exposition in Seattle. She was the first woman president of the Los Angeles High School Teachers' Association.

Galpin was president of the National College Women's Equal Suffrage League in 1909, and a leader in the California Equal Suffrage Association. In 1912 she toured California lecturing on "Why the Progressive Platform is a Woman's Platform", in support of the Progressive Party. She ran for seats in Congress and the California state senate in 1923. She was a California delegate to the Democratic National Convention in 1924. She spoke in favor of Prohibition at a 1928 campaign rally in Los Angeles for presidential candidate Al Smith.

Galpin was active in the California Federation of Women's Clubs, and president of the Los Angeles County Federation of Business and Professional Women's Clubs. She served on executive boards of the Women's Vocational Alliance and the Survey on Race Relations.

== Personal life ==
Galpin lived in Los Angeles with her half-sister, puppeteer Ellen Galpin, in her later years. Lloy Galpin died of heart disease in 1935, aged 58 years, while visiting another sister, Hazel Galpin Lowe, in San Diego.
