= Kate Tupper Galpin =

American educator and woman's club leader

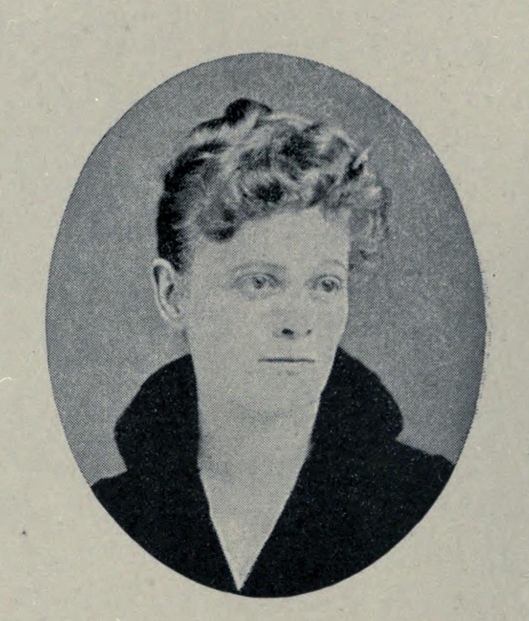
Kate Tupper Galpin

Kate Tupper Galpin (née Kate Tupper, 3 August 1855 – 1906) was an American educator and woman's club leader. For several years President of the Woman's Parliament of Southern California, Galpin was a natural teacher. Before instituting her classes in Southern California, she occupied the position of Professor of Pedagogy in the University of Nevada. During the five years of her residence in California, Galpin played an active part in the club life of the State, occupied many positions of honor, and through her classes in Shakespeare and Current Topics, conducted in Los Angeles and numerous outlying towns, contributed largely to the educational and intellectual life of the community. She gave five addresses before the Women's Congress at the Columbian Exposition, and lectured upon the suffrage platform throughout California.

== Early years and education ==
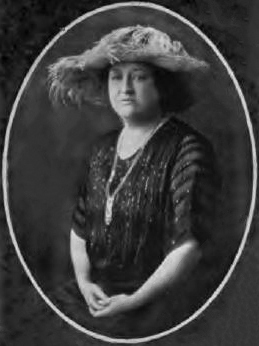
Mrs. W.E. Silverwood, 1922 President of the Kate Tupper Galpin Shakespeare Club, Who's who among the women of California

Born in Brighton, Iowa in 1855, she was educated as a teacher at the Iowa State College. She was the daughter of Allen Tupper and Ellen Smith Tupper; among her sisters were two Unitarian ministers, Ellen Tupper Wilkes and Mila Tupper Maynard, and educator Margaret Tupper True. She lived during her girlhood on a farm near Brighton. As a child she was very frail. Her first teacher was her mother, who taught school while her father was in the American Civil War. Her mother would go to school on horseback, with Kate behind her and a baby sister in her lap. Later, she attended the village school until she was 15, when she was sent to the Iowa Agricultural College in Ames, Iowa where she was graduated in 1874. The vacations of the college were in the winter, and in the vacation following her sophomore year she had her first experience in teaching, in a district school 3 miles (4.8 km) out of Des Moines, Iowa, where the family was then living. The next winter, when seventeen years of age, she served as an assistant in a Baptist College in Des Moines, her earnings enabling her to pay most of her college expenses.

== Career ==
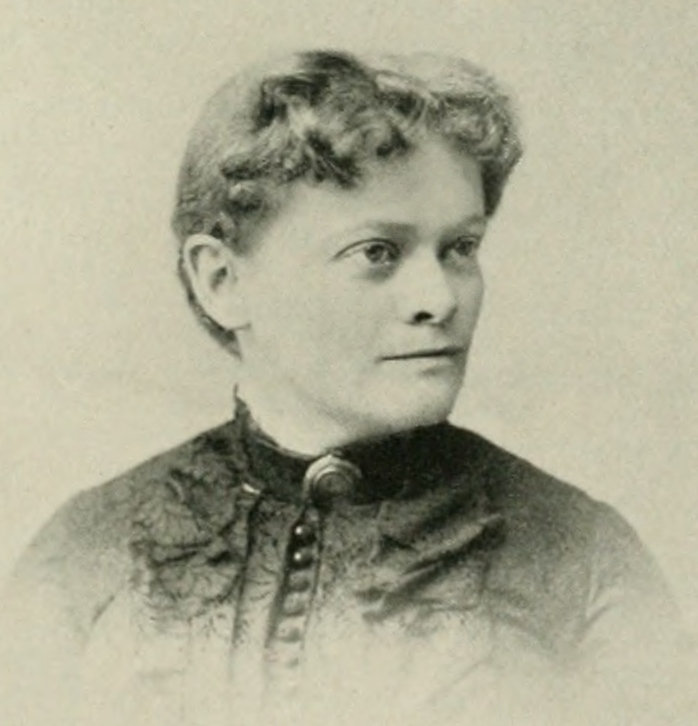

Her first schools after graduating were in Iowa. From 1875 to 1879, she taught in the Marshalltown, Iowa high school. In 1878, she taught an ungraded school in the little village of Beloit, Iowa, in order to be near her parents, who were living on a homestead in Dakota, and to have with her in the school her younger brother and sister. Later, she taught for four years as principal of the academic department of the Wisconsin Normal School in Whitewater, Wisconsin. During the following three years, she held positions in the high school of Portland, Oregon. Next she was called to the professorship of pedagogy in the State University of Nevada, with salary and authority the same as the men of the faculty.

In 1890, she resigned her professorship in the university and received a call to the presidency of a prominent normal school, which she refused. That summer she became the wife of Cromwell Galpin, of Los Angeles, California, consummating a somewhat romantic attachment of her college life. She later taught special classes in oratory in the University of Los Angeles. In 1892, Galpin opened a class in Shakespeare for mature women. The Kate Tupper Galpin Shakespeare Club met monthly, and by 1922, it had 133 active members 133. She had one child, a daughter, Ellen Galpin. Her stepdaughter Lloy Galpin was also a suffragist, teacher, and clubwoman.
