= Eliza Tupper Wilkes =

American suffragist and Unitarian Universalist minister

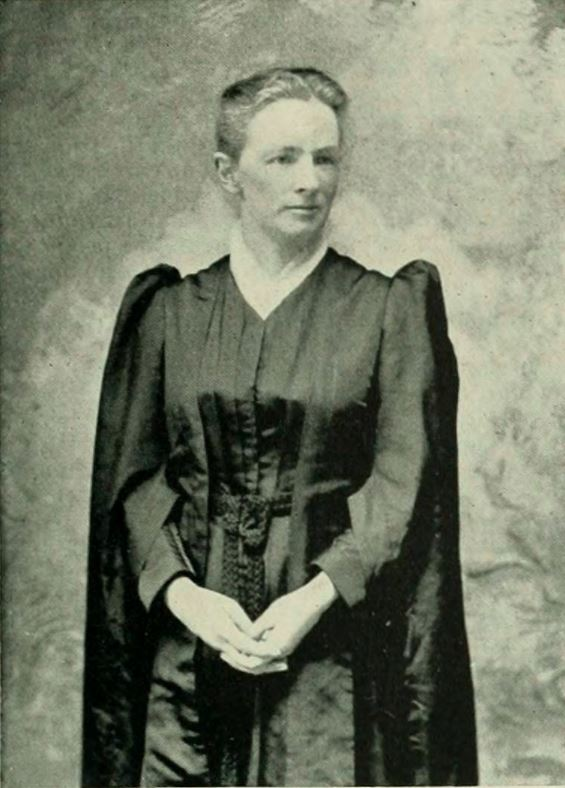
- Tupper Wilkes from an 1893 publication
- Born: Eliza Mason Tupper; October 8, 1844; Houlton, Maine, U.S.
- Died: February 5, 1917 (aged 72); Atlantic City, New Jersey, U.S.
- Occupation: Minister

Eliza Mason Tupper Wilkes (October 8, 1844 – February 5, 1917) was an American suffragist and Unitarian Universalist minister.

== Early life ==
Eliza Mason Tupper was born in Houlton, Maine, the daughter of Allen Tupper and Ellen Smith Tupper. Her father was a Protestant minister; her mother was a writer and editor, and an expert beekeeper. Her sisters included Mila Tupper Maynard (who also became a Unitarian minister) and educators Margaret Tupper True and Kate Tupper Galpin. The family moved to Iowa in Tupper's childhood, but she returned to live with grandparents in Maine for her schooling. She graduated from Iowa Central College in 1866.

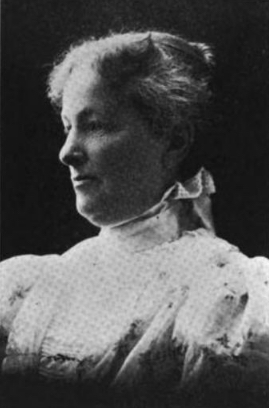
Eliza Tupper Wilkes, from a 1913 publication.

== Ministry work ==
Tupper taught school in Mount Pleasant, Iowa as a young woman, hoping that her training as a teacher would prepare her for life as a Baptist missionary. However, she converted to Universalist instead, and became a minister in that denomination, preaching first in Iowa, then Wisconsin, then Minnesota, where she was ordained in 1871. After her husband became a lawyer, the family moved to Colorado, where she organized a new church in Colorado Springs. In 1875 she attended the first Women's Ministerial Conference, hosted in Boston by Julia Ward Howe. In 1876 she was one of the founding leaders of Colorado College.

In 1878, Wilkes moved again, to Sioux Falls in Dakota Territory. She organized seven Universalist congregations in the upper midwest, sometimes providing sermons and pastoral care in multiple states by riding a circuit from church to church. Once the churches were established, she handed them to another pastor, often another woman pastor from the Iowa Sisterhood. She was director of the Iowa Unitarian Conference.

Wilkes relocated to California in the 1890s, serving as pastor of the Unitarian Church in Alameda, and assistant pastor in Oakland, California. She was a delegate to the Pacific Unitarian Conference, and was president of the Western Woman's Unitarian Conference. Late in life, she was chaplain of the Cumnock School of Expression in Los Angeles.

== Suffrage ==
Wilkes was honorary vice president of the National Woman Suffrage Association, representing South Dakota, in 1884. She attended the World's Congress of Representative Women in Chicago in 1893. In 1896 she spoke at a Salvation Army camp meeting in Oakland, on the same platform as Susan B. Anthony. She split pulpit duties with Anna Howard Shaw and Eleanor Gordon at the 1905 national suffrage convention in Portland, Oregon. She shared the platform with both Anthony and Shaw at the second annual Women's Congress in San Francisco in 1895, and at a 1905 suffrage rally in Venice, California. She represented California at the International Woman Suffrage Conference in Budapest in 1913.

== Personal life and death ==
Tupper married William Augustus Wilkes, a lawyer, in 1869, in Wisconsin; they had five sons and a daughter born between 1872 and 1884. Tupper Wilkes was widowed in 1909, and died in 1917, aged 72 years, while on holiday in Atlantic City, New Jersey. Wilkes' grave in South Dakota is not separately marked, but there is a historical marker about her life and work nearby.

Her sister Mila Tupper Maynard wrote a biography, A Mother's Ministry: Glimpses of the life of Eliza Tupper Wilkes, 1844-1917. Her sister Margaret Tupper True's son was illustrator and muralist Allen Tupper True.
