= Santa Cecilia Orchestra (Los Angeles) =

Symphony orchestra in Los Angeles

Santa Cecilia Orchestra Orquesta Santa Cecilia
- chamber orchestra and symphony orchestra
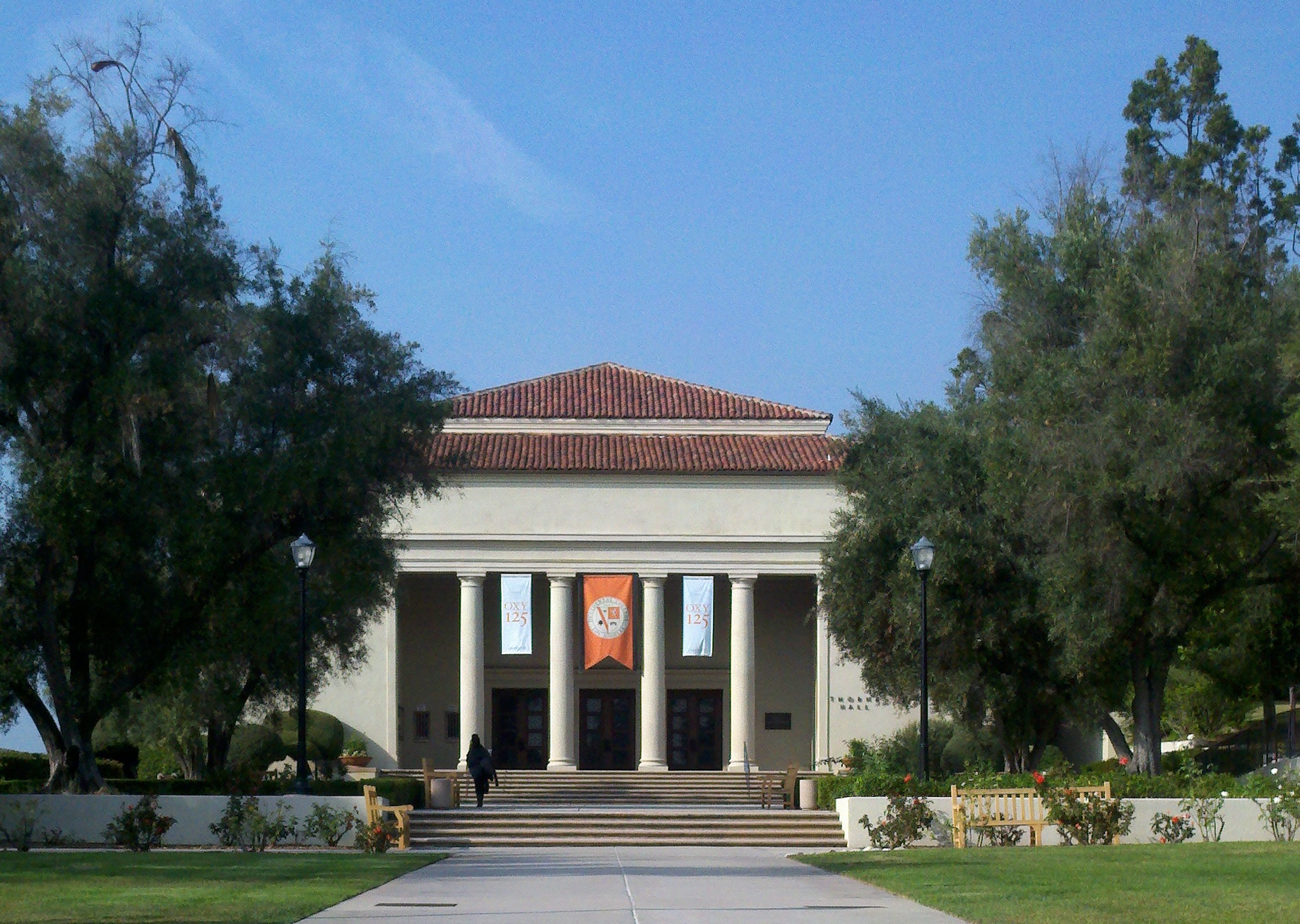
- Thorne Hall, the orchestra's principal venue
- Founded: 1992 (34 years ago)
- Concert hall: Thorne Hall, Eagle Rock, Los Angeles, California, U.S.
- Principal conductor: Sonia Marie De León de Vega
- Website: scorchestra.org

The Santa Cecilia Orchestra (Spanish: Orquesta Santa Cecilia) is a symphony orchestra in Los Angeles, California, United States.

It was founded in 1993 by Sonia Marie De León de Vega, who has since then been the principal conductor.

The orchestra generally seeks to promote Latin American composers, presenting their pieces alongside works by major Western composers of classical music. It performs chamber music and full orchestral concerts at Thorne Hall at Occidental College, located in the Los Angeles neighborhood of Eagle Rock.

Its two-year music-education program, Discovering Music, is offered in sixteen elementary schools throughout Los Angeles.

== History and operations ==
Sonia Marie De León de Vega founded the orchestra in 1992 with money of her own. At the orchestra's first concert, in St. Ignatius Church in Highland Park, Los Angeles, twenty-eight musicians performed for an audience of twelve people.

Thorne Hall at Occidental College, where De León teaches, became the permanent residence of the orchestra for the 1999–2000 season. The orchestra has eighty-five paid professional musicians from other orchestras, both symphonic and cinematic. The orchestra has an annual budget of about $250,000, and has received funding from the National Endowment for the Arts, the California Arts Council, the City of Los Angeles Cultural Affairs Department, and the Los Angeles County Arts Commission.

=== Discovering Music program ===
The orchestra's Discovering Music program was started in 1998. Orchestra members visit elementary schools in the Los Angeles area to present classical music and orchestral instruments. The program has reached more than forty schools and tens of thousands of students.

== See also ==
- List of symphony orchestras in the United States
- Music of Los Angeles
