= Ellen Smith Tupper =

American writer, expert beekeeper and editor

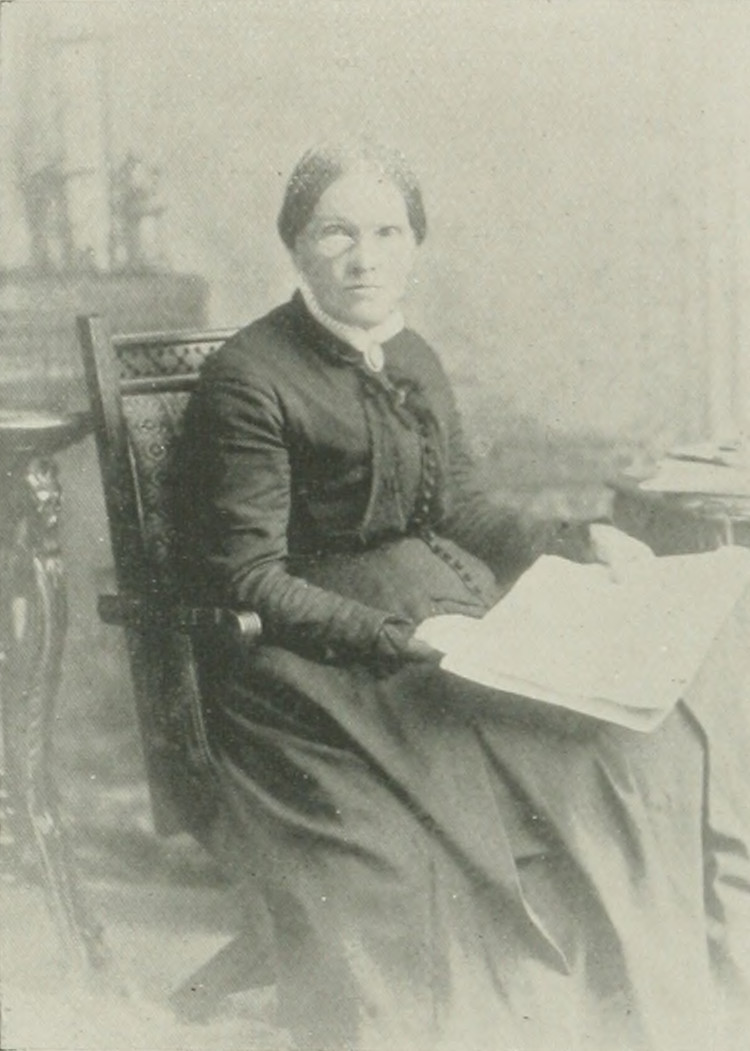
- Ellen Smith Tupper, from an 1893 publication.
- Born: Ellen Smith; April 9, 1822; Providence, Rhode Island
- Died: March 12, 1888 (aged 65); El Paso, Texas
- Occupation(s): writer, editor, beekeeper

Ellen Smith Tupper (April 9, 1822 – March 12, 1888) was an American writer, expert beekeeper and the first female editor of an entomological journal.

== Early life ==
Ellen Smith was born in Providence, Rhode Island, the daughter of Noah Smith and Hannah Draper Wheaton Smith. Hannah Smith died when Ellen was young, and Ellen was raised in Calais, Maine after 1833. Her maternal uncle was diplomat Henry Wheaton.

== Career ==
Tupper taught school in her home in Iowa when her children were young, earning money by adding paying students to her children's lessons. She started keeping bees in Iowa by 1860. Shortly before the American Civil War she started to write short articles on her first experiences in beekeeping, which were published in a local newspaper.

In 1871, she and Annie Savery started the Italian Bee Company, based in Des Moines, Iowa, to import and sell Italian honey bees in the American midwest. "She attends personally to all shipments of bees, honey, extractors, hives, etc., to all her correspondence and her bees," noted a profile in 1873. She attended the North American Bee-Keepers Convention in Cleveland in 1871, and in Indianapolis in 1872, and was quoted as a national expert on apiary management the following year.

Tupper was editor of The Bee-Keepers' Journal from 1873 to 1875, and taught bee-keeping at the State Agricultural College of Iowa. She also wrote for American Bee Journal, Prairie Farmer, The National Bee Journal and Youth's Companion.

Tupper lost two hundred hives in a fire in 1873, a major blow to her work. "I have worked so hard and am so tired, that I can form no plans for the future," she said at the time. She was selected to coordinate the bee exhibit at the 1876 Philadelphia Centennial Exposition.

However, in January 1876 she was arrested on forgery charges. "It appears that she freely used the names of relatives and friends, and in addition, forged the names of leading citizens of various cities of Iowa," in signing checks, according to a report at the time. She was found "not guilty, the defendant being insane, and not responsible for her acts". In time she was released and relocated to Dakota Territory.

== Personal life ==
Ellen Smith married Allen Tupper, a lumberman and aspiring Baptist minister, in 1843. The Tuppers moved to Iowa in 1851. Among their eleven children were two Unitarian ministers, Eliza Tupper Wilkes and Mila Tupper Maynard, and educator Kate Tupper Galpin. Artist Allen Tupper True was her grandson. Ellen Smith Tupper was widowed in 1879, and died from heart disease in 1888, aged 65 years, in El Paso, Texas, while staying with another daughter, Margaret Tupper True, there. Her grave is in Sioux Falls, South Dakota.
