= Eagle Rock (formation) =

Rock formation landmark in Los Angeles

The Eagle Rock
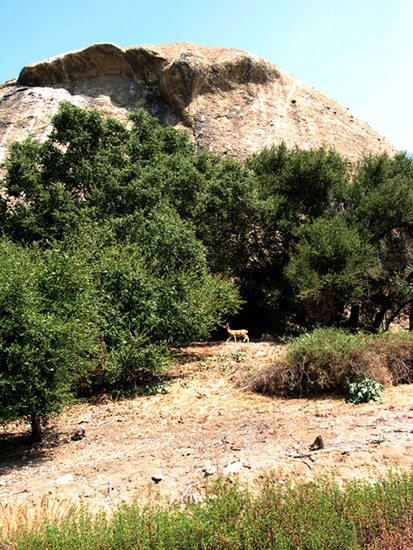
- The Eagle Rock
- Interactive map of The Eagle Rock
- 34°8′36″N 118°11′1″W
- Location: Eagle Rock, Los Angeles, CA

Site notes
- Area: Northeast Los Angeles

Los Angeles Historic-Cultural Monument
- Designated: November 16, 1962
- Reference no.: 10

Eagle Rock, L.A. Historic-Cultural Monument No. 10, is a large dome-shaped rock formation with an indentation that resembles an eagle in flight. The neighborhood of Eagle Rock, where the rock is located is named after the rock. Once known as Eagle Rock Valley, it incorporated in 1911 and was annexed by Los Angeles in 1923. Given its visibility from the Ventura Freeway, CA-134, Eagle Rock is a familiar sight to millions.

== History ==
Eagle Rock is a large sandstone formation created by hot springs millions of years ago. Formerly known as La Piedra Gorda (Fat Rock), a name given to it by Spanish settlers, locals have been calling it Eagle Rock (or The Rock) since at least 1888. The first published illustration of La Piedra Gorda was made by Archduke of Austria, Ludwig Louis Salvator. His book was published in 1878.

The Tongva inhabited the caves at the base of The Rock and used it as a lookout point in the 1700s. It's rumoured that infamous bandit, Tiburcio Vasquez, used the same caves as a hideout in 1874. In the early 20th Century, yearly Easter services were held at the top of the Rock.

The Rock was named a Historic-Cultural Monument in 1962 but did not belong to the City of Los Angeles until 1995, when the City purchased it for $700,000.
