= Myron W. Reed =

American activist (1836–1899)

The Reverend Myron W. Reed
- Born: Myron Winslow Reed; July 24, 1836; Brookfield, Vermont, US
- Died: January 30, 1899 (aged 62); Denver, Colorado, US
- Occupations: Christian minister; lawyer
- Spouse: Louise Lyon (m. 1883)

Ecclesiastical career
- Religion: Christianity (Congregationalist)

Myron Winslow Reed (1836–1899) was an American lawyer, Congregationalist minister, and political activist. Reed is best remembered as a leading voice of the social gospel movement in the American West and as the president of the Brotherhood of the Cooperative Commonwealth, a utopian socialist organization seeking to establish cooperative colonies.

== Early life ==
Reed was born July 24, 1836, in Brookfield, Vermont. His father was a minister. He attended the St. Lawrence Academy of Potsdam, New York.

Reed taught school for two academic years, from 1858 to 1860, at Watertown, Wisconsin, studying law during the evenings. He was admitted to the Wisconsin state bar in 1860.

Reed did not feel himself drawn to the legal profession, however, and at the urging of friends he left for Chicago to enroll at the Congregational theological seminary there.

With the outbreak of the American Civil War, Reed put aside his theological studies and enlisted as an officer in the 18th Michigan Volunteer Infantry Regiment, serving as a lieutenant. He would serve four years in the Union Army, gaining promotion to the rank of captain in 1863 and commanding 100 scouts, mustering out only at the end of the war.

Reed was wounded in action in Tennessee when he rode into an ambush, shot in the leg at close range with a shotgun loaded with buckshot. Damage done to his knee in the encounter would afflict Reed for the rest of his life.

In November 1865 Reed resumed his religious studies, preaching in El Paso, Illinois, on weekends.

== Congregationalist minister ==
Reed's first Congregationalist pastorate was at Hudson, Michigan. This was followed with a stint at Columbus, Wisconsin, before being moved to the Southern metropolis of New Orleans, Louisiana, in 1868. It was there that he met the abolitionist school teacher Louise Lyon, who was a soprano in the church choir. The pair married in 1883.

From New Orleans, Reed was called to Milwaukee, Wisconsin, where he was made pastor of the Olivet Congregational Church. He would remain in the position for four years, preaching for a time from the stage of a local theater when his church was destroyed in a fire.

Reed's reputation as a spellbinding and thoughtful divine grew and he was called by the First Presbyterian Church of Indianapolis, Indiana, a prosperous congregation which included among its members US President Benjamin Harrison and his wife. He would remain there for seven years before moving to his last city, becoming pastor of the First Congregational Church of Denver, Colorado, in 1884. He felt "that the West, more malleable than the East, offered a fresh opportunity to fulfill the United States' divine mission by creating a just, truly democratic society", "an ideal community worthy of the kingdom of God." He would have a six-month sabbatical over that summer, coming back to head Denver's Broadway Temple congregation, which met each week in the Broadway Theater instead of in a conventional church setting.

Reed became a member of the Knights of Labor circa 1884. In 1886 Reed served as a Democratic congressional candidate. He was nominated again in 1892.

== Death and legacy ==
Reed was stricken with fatal illness late in January 1899, lapsing into unconsciousness during his final hours. He died at 4:55 am on January 30 in Denver, with physicians listing the cause of death as chronic entero colitis inflammation. Reed was 62 years old at the time of his death.

The memorial service which followed was pointedly addressed by a representative of the three main religious tendencies of Colorado, led by the rabbi W. S. Friedman, the Roman Catholic priest William O'Ryan, and the Protestant minister Barton Aylesworth and addressed by several secular speakers. The Grand Army of the Republic and Masons, two organizations with which Reed was actively involved, were also made part of the proceedings. A committee of six state senators were appointed by Governor Charles S. Thomas, who also paved the way for Reed's body to lie in state in a closed casket at the Colorado State Capitol prior to interment.

Reed was survived by his wife and three children.

== See also ==
- Mila Tupper Maynard
