= Eagle Rock, Los Angeles =

Eagle Rock
- Neighborhood of Los Angeles
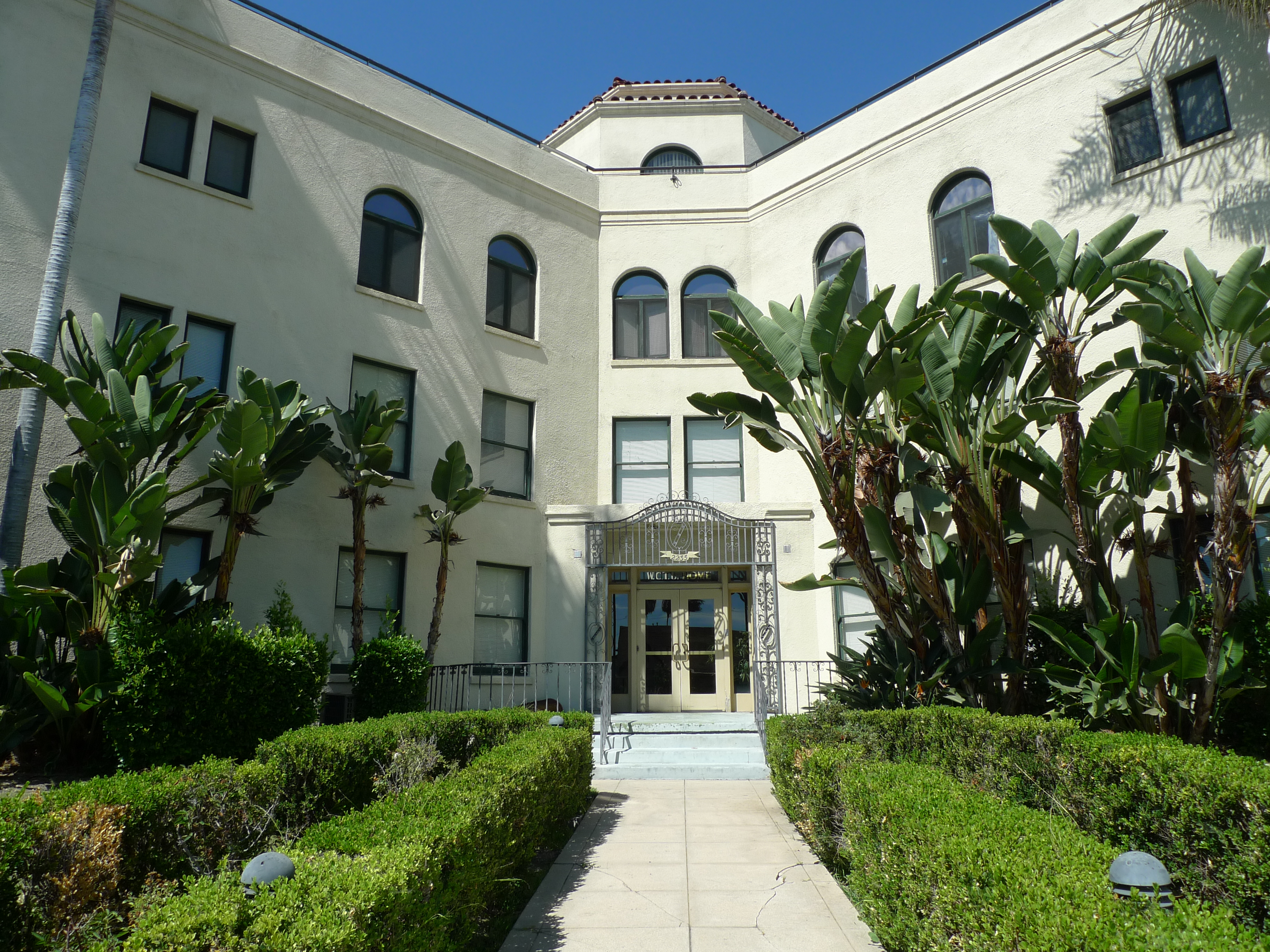
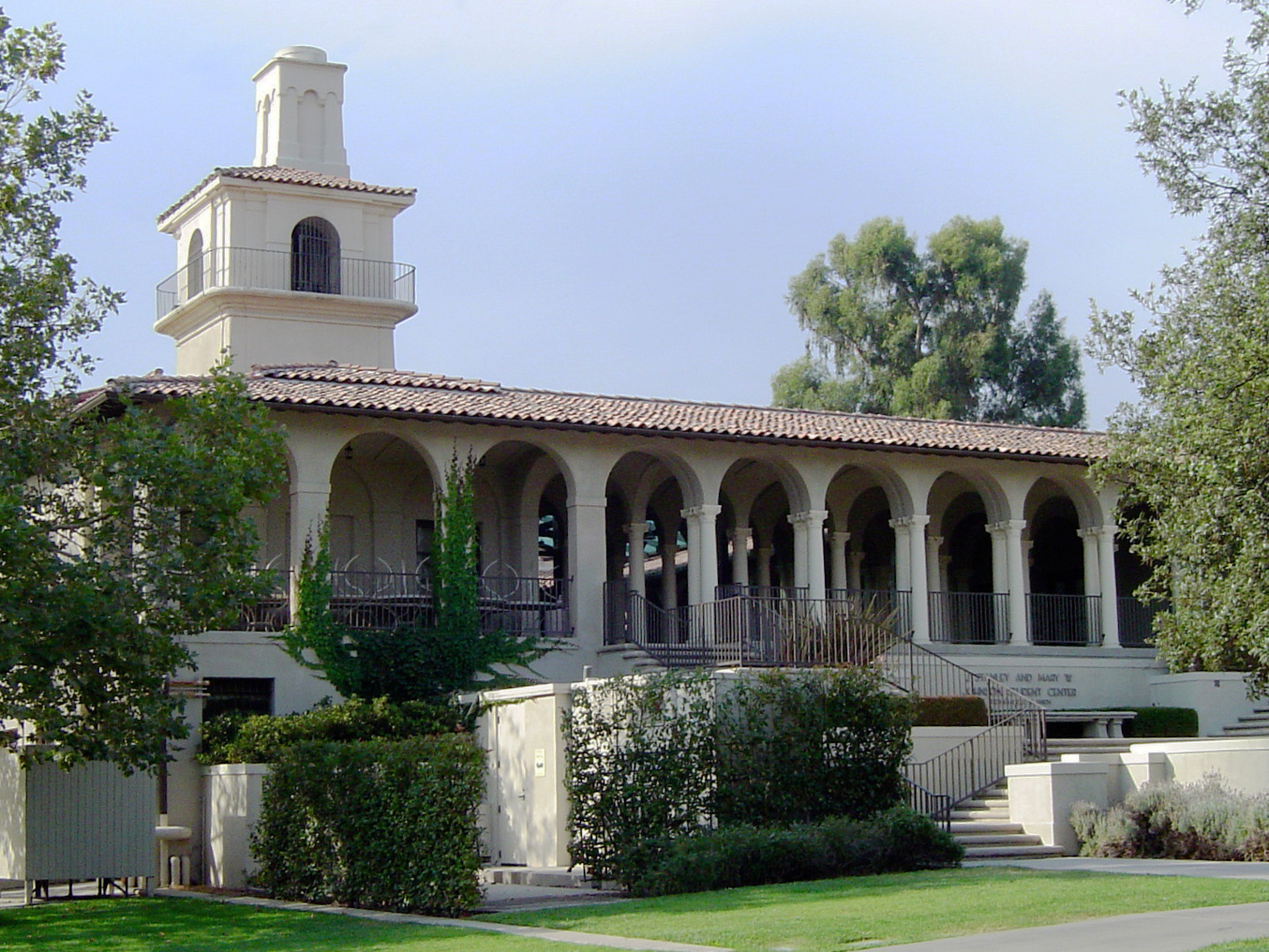
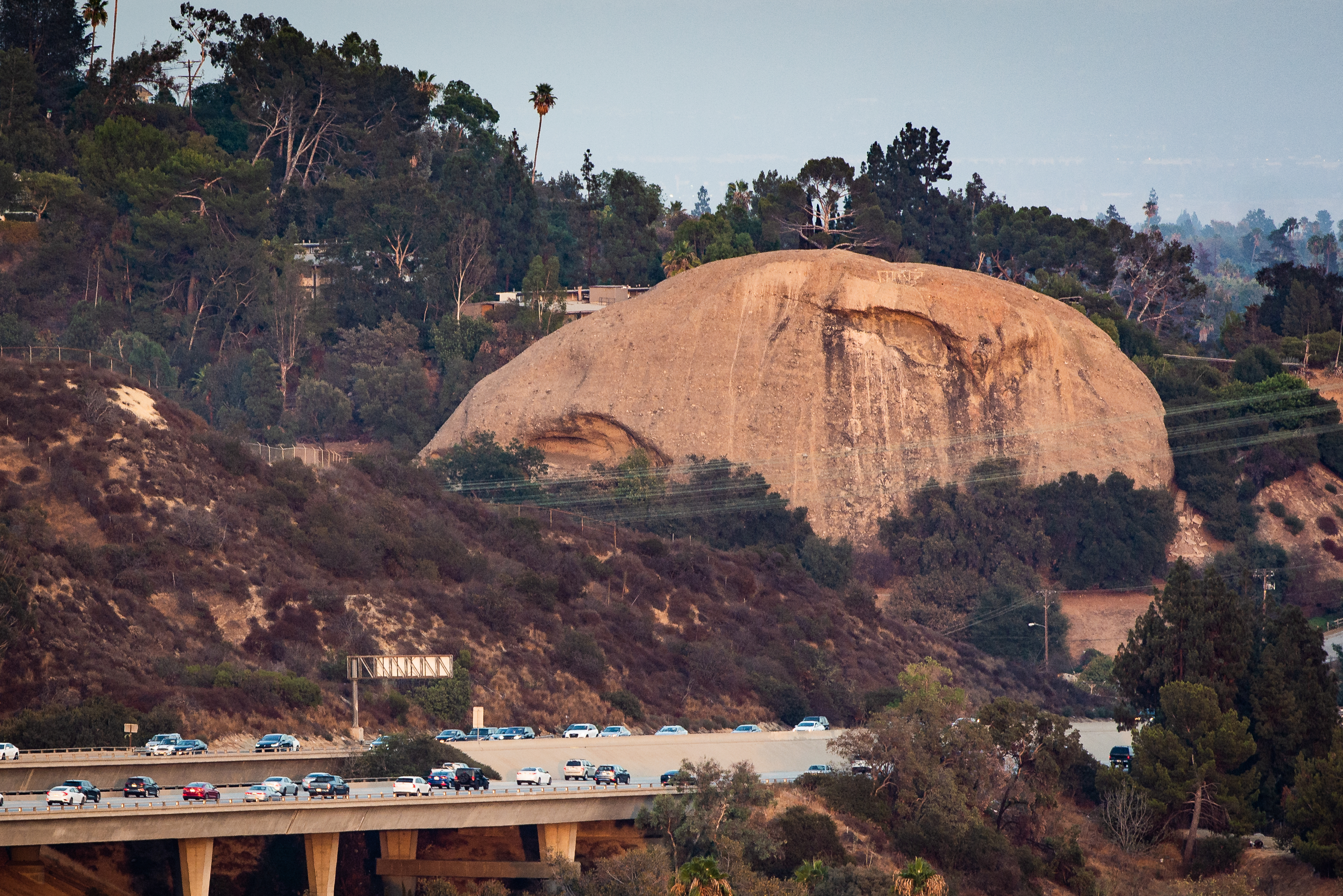
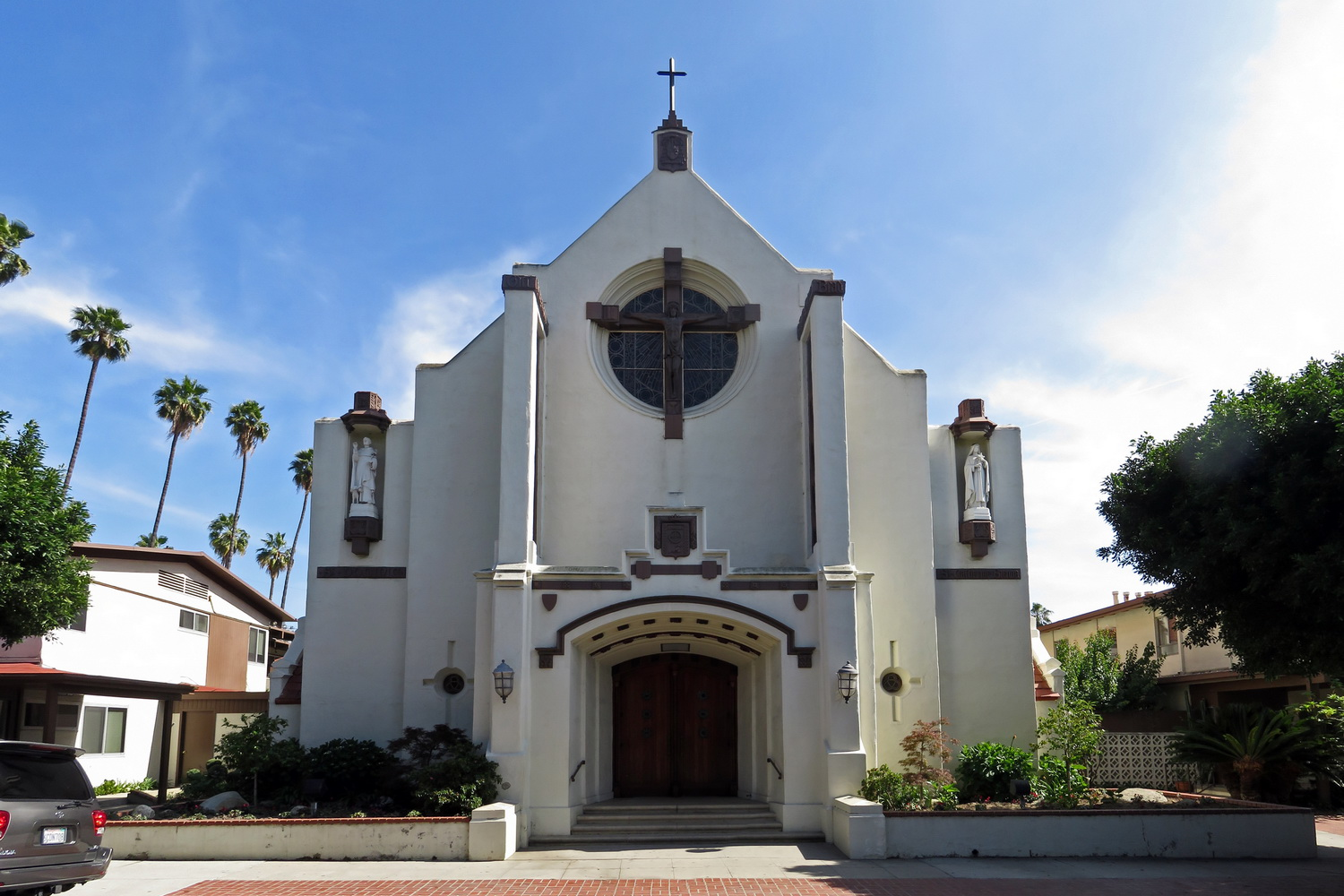
- Top: historic Women's Temperence Union building (left), Occidental College (right); bottom: Eagle Rock (left), St. Dominic Catholic Church (right).

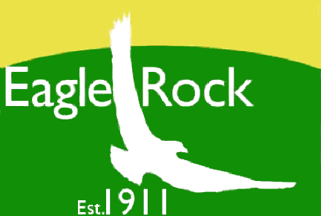
- Flag

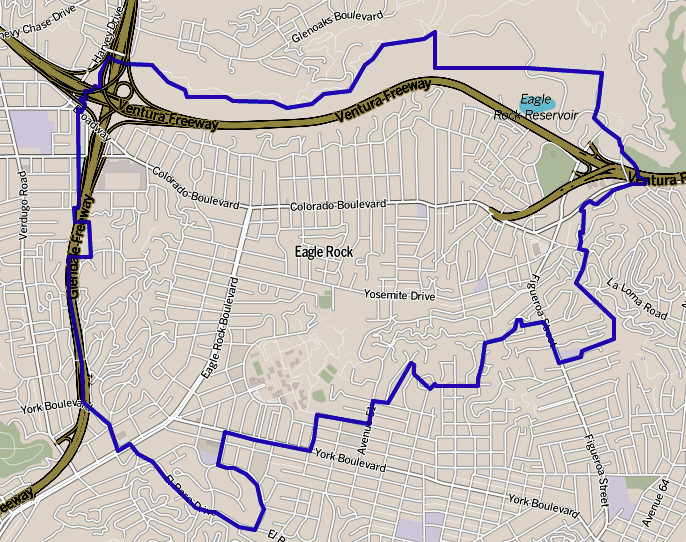
- Map of the Eagle Rock neighborhood of Los Angeles as delineated by the Los Angeles Times

- Location of Eagle Rock in Central Los Angeles.
- Coordinates: 34.13889°N 118.21306°W
- Country: United States of America
- State: California
- County: Los Angeles
- City: Los Angeles

Government
  - U.S. House: Jimmy Gomez (D)

Area
  - Total: 4.25 sq mi (11.0 km^{2})
- Elevation: 568 ft (173 m)

Population (2008)
  - Total: 34,644
  - Density: 8,150/sq mi (3,150/km^{2})
- Time zone: UTC-8 (PST)
  - Summer (DST): UTC-7 (PDT)
- Zip codes: 90041, 90042, 90065
- Area codes: 213, 323

Eagle Rock is a neighborhood of Northeast Los Angeles, abutting the San Rafael Hills in Los Angeles County, California. The community is named after Eagle Rock, a large boulder whose shadow resembles an eagle. Eagle Rock was once part of the Rancho San Rafael under Spanish and Mexican governorship. In 1911, Eagle Rock was incorporated as a city, and in 1923 it was annexed by Los Angeles.

The neighborhood is the home of Occidental College. As with other neighborhoods in Northeast Los Angeles, Eagle Rock experienced significant gentrification in the 21st century.

== History ==
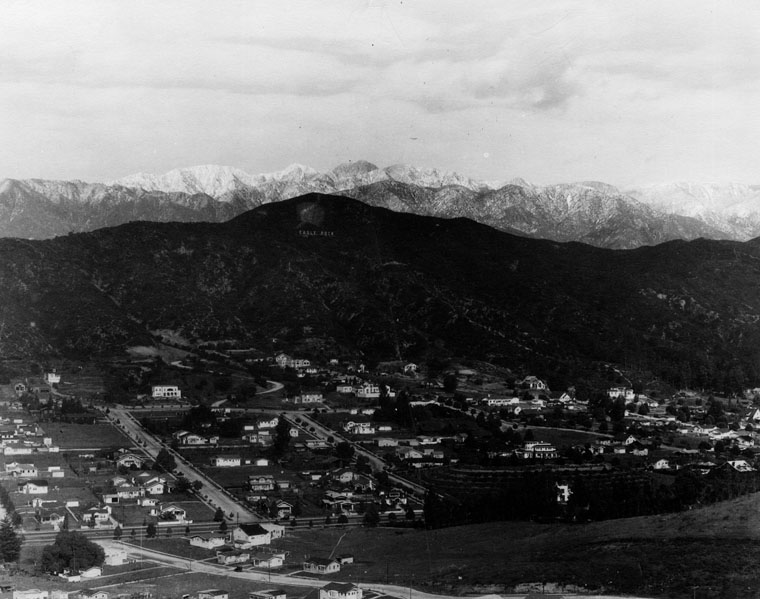
View of Eagle Rock, 1900

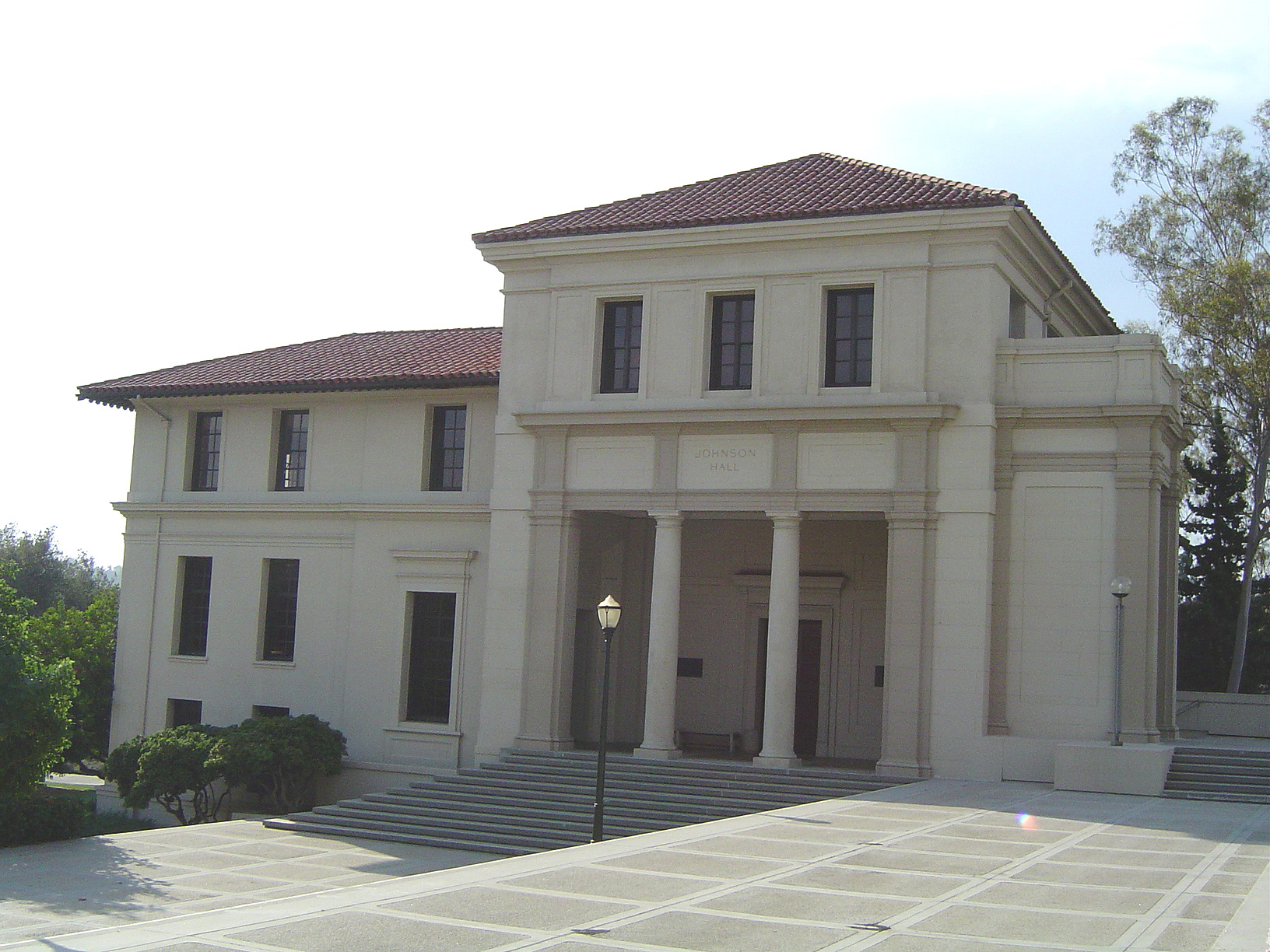
Occidental College, founded in 1887, moved to Eagle Rock in 1914.

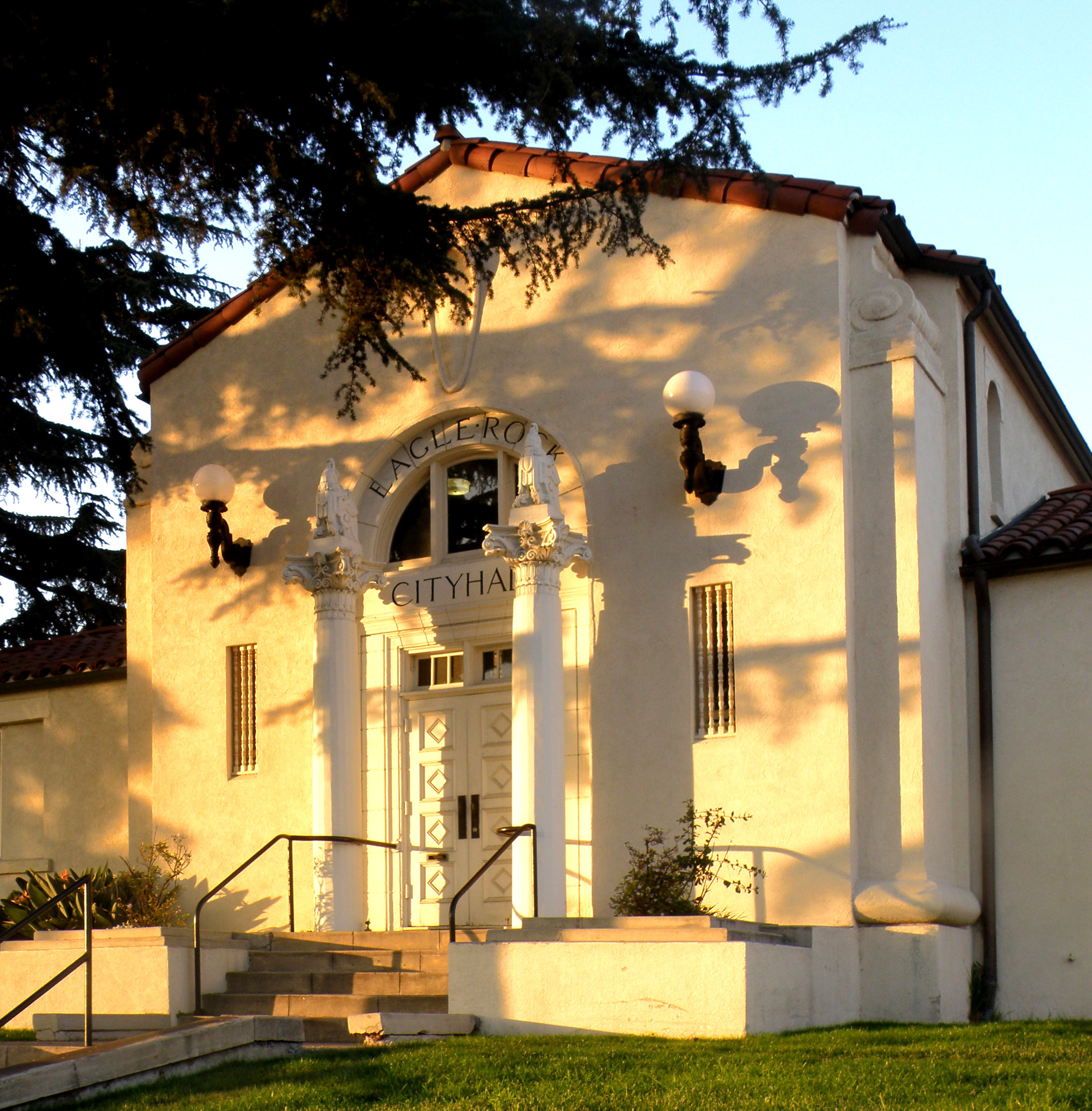
The Spanish Colonial Revival style Eagle Rock City Hall, built in 1923.

Before the arrival of European settlers, the secluded valley below the San Rafael Hills that is roughly congruent to Eagle Rock's present boundaries was inhabited by the Tongva people, whose staple food was the acorns from the valley's many oak trees. These aboriginal inhabitants were displaced by Spanish settlers in the late 18th century, with the area incorporated into the Rancho San Rafael. Following court battles, the area known as Rancho San Rafael was divided into 31 parcels in 1870. Benjamin Dreyfus was awarded what is now called Eagle Rock. In the 1880s Eagle Rock existed as a farming community.

The arrival of American settlers and the growth of Los Angeles resulted in steadily increasing semi-rural development in the region throughout the late 19th century. The construction of Henry Huntington's Los Angeles Railway trolley line up Eagle Rock Boulevard to Colorado Boulevard and on Colorado to Townsend Avenue commenced the rapid suburbanization of the Eagle Rock Valley.

Although Eagle Rock, which is geographically located between the cities of Pasadena and Glendale, was once incorporated as a city in 1911, its need for an adequate water supply and a high school resulted in its annexation by Los Angeles in 1923.

Several major crime sprees occurred in the neighborhood during the late 20th century. An early victim of the Hillside Strangler was discovered in an Eagle Rock neighborhood on October 31, 1977. The discovery, along with the successive murders of at least 10 other women in the area over the course of five months, frightened local residents. According to an opinion piece by a resident under the pseudonym Deirdre Blackstone that was published in the Los Angeles Times on December 6, 1977:

Groups of gum-chewing girls in look-alike hairdos and jeans who used to haunt the Eagle Rock Plaza—they too are keeping close to home ... We are all afraid. For women living alone, ours is an actual visceral fear that starts at the feet. Then it hits the knees—and finally it grips the mind.

Two men, Kenneth Bianchi and Angelo Buono, were subsequently convicted of the murders.

On the night of March 20, 1985, an 8-year-old girl was abducted from her home in Eagle Rock and sexually assaulted by a man dubbed the "Valley Intruder", "Walk-in Killer", and "The Night Stalker," later identified as Richard Ramirez. This was the seventh in a long string of murders and sexual assaults committed by Ramirez in Los Angeles and San Francisco before he was apprehended.

In 2002, an effort to designate an area of the community as "Philippine Village" for the large Filipino American population was stopped.

Like the surrounding areas of Northeast Los Angeles, Eagle Rock has undergone gentrification. Beginning in the 2000s, the area attracted young professionals and fostered a hipster culture. As a result, housing prices have dramatically risen and a new wave of restaurants, coffee shops, bars, and art galleries have appeared over the last decade.

== Demographics ==
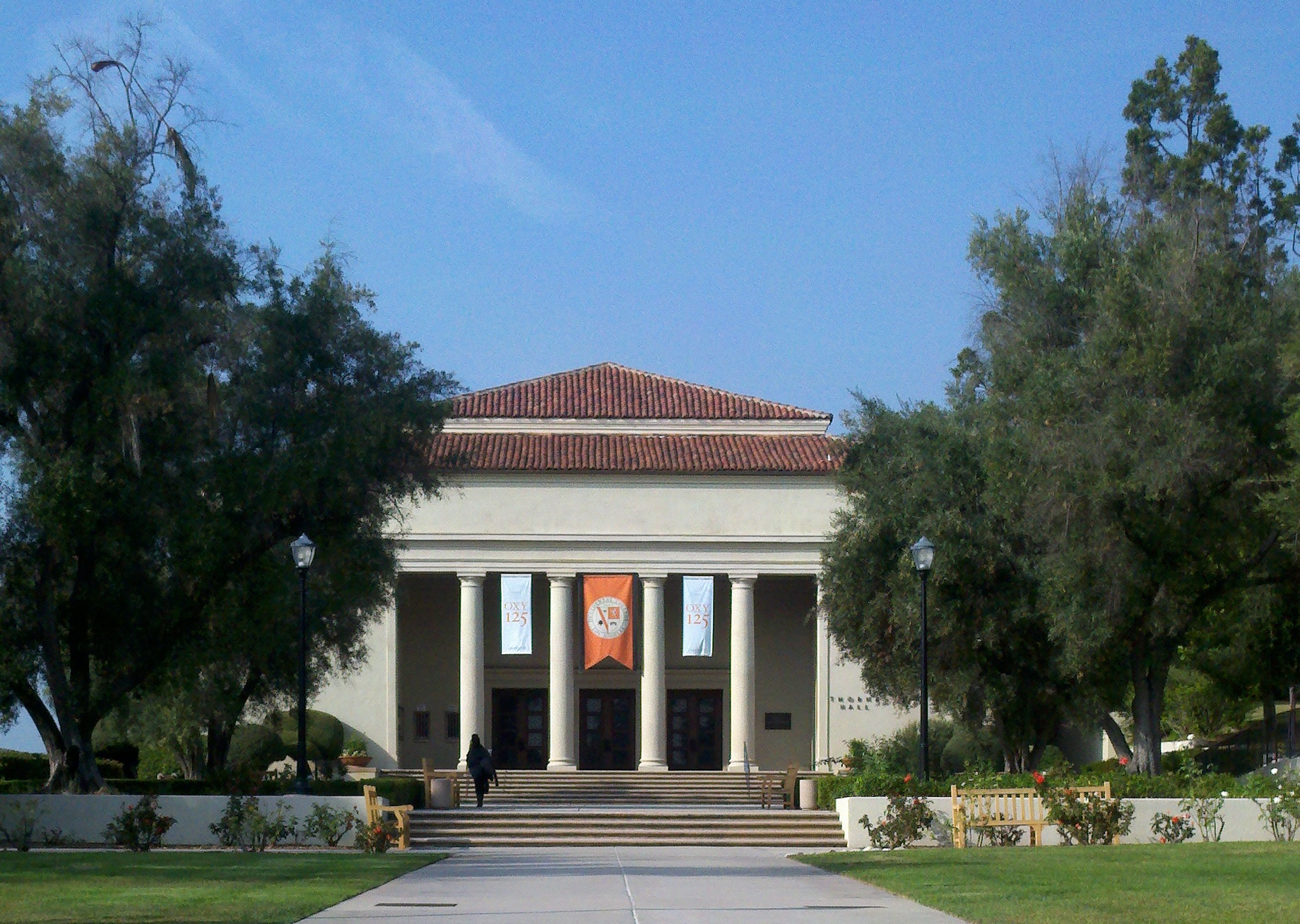
The Santa Cecilia Orchestra, founded in 1993 by Sonia Marie De León de Vega, performs at Thorne Hall

The neighborhood is inhabited by a wide variety of ethnic and socioeconomic groups and the creative class. Over the past decade the Eagle Rock and neighboring Highland Park have been experiencing gentrification as young professionals have moved from nearby neighborhoods such as Los Feliz and Silver Lake. A core of counter-culture writers, artists and filmmakers has existed in Eagle Rock since the 1920s.

According to the "Mapping L.A." project of the Los Angeles Times, the 2000 U.S. census counted 32,493 residents in 4.25 mi^{2} (11.0 km^{2}) Eagle Rock neighborhood, 7,644 people per square mile; a population density considered average for the city and Los Angeles County. In 2008, the city estimated that the population had increased to 34,466. In 2000, the median age for residents was 35, about average for city and county neighborhoods.

The neighborhood was considered "highly diverse" ethnically within Los Angeles, with a relatively high percentage of Asian people. The breakdown was Latinos, 40.3%; whites, 29.8%; Asians, 23.9%; blacks, 1.8%; and others, 4.1%. The Philippines (35.1%) and Mexico (25.1%) were the most common places of birth for the 38.5% of the residents who were born abroad—an average figure for Los Angeles.

The median yearly household income in 2008 dollars was $67,253, considered high for the city. The neighborhood's income levels, like its ethnic composition, can still be marked by notable diversity, but typically ranges from lower-middle to upper-middle class. Renters occupied 43.9% of the housing stock, and house- or apartment-owners held 56.1%. The average household size of 2.8 people was considered normal for Los Angeles.

Thirty percent of Eagle Rock residents aged 25 and older had earned a four-year degree by 2000, an average percentage for the city.

== Geography ==
Eagle Rock is bordered by Glendale to the north and west, Highland Park to the southeast, Glassell Park to the southwest, and Pasadena to the east. Major thoroughfares include Eagle Rock Boulevard and Colorado Boulevard, with Figueroa Street along the eastern boundary. The Glendale and Ventura freeways run along the district's western and northern edges, respectively.

== Landmarks ==
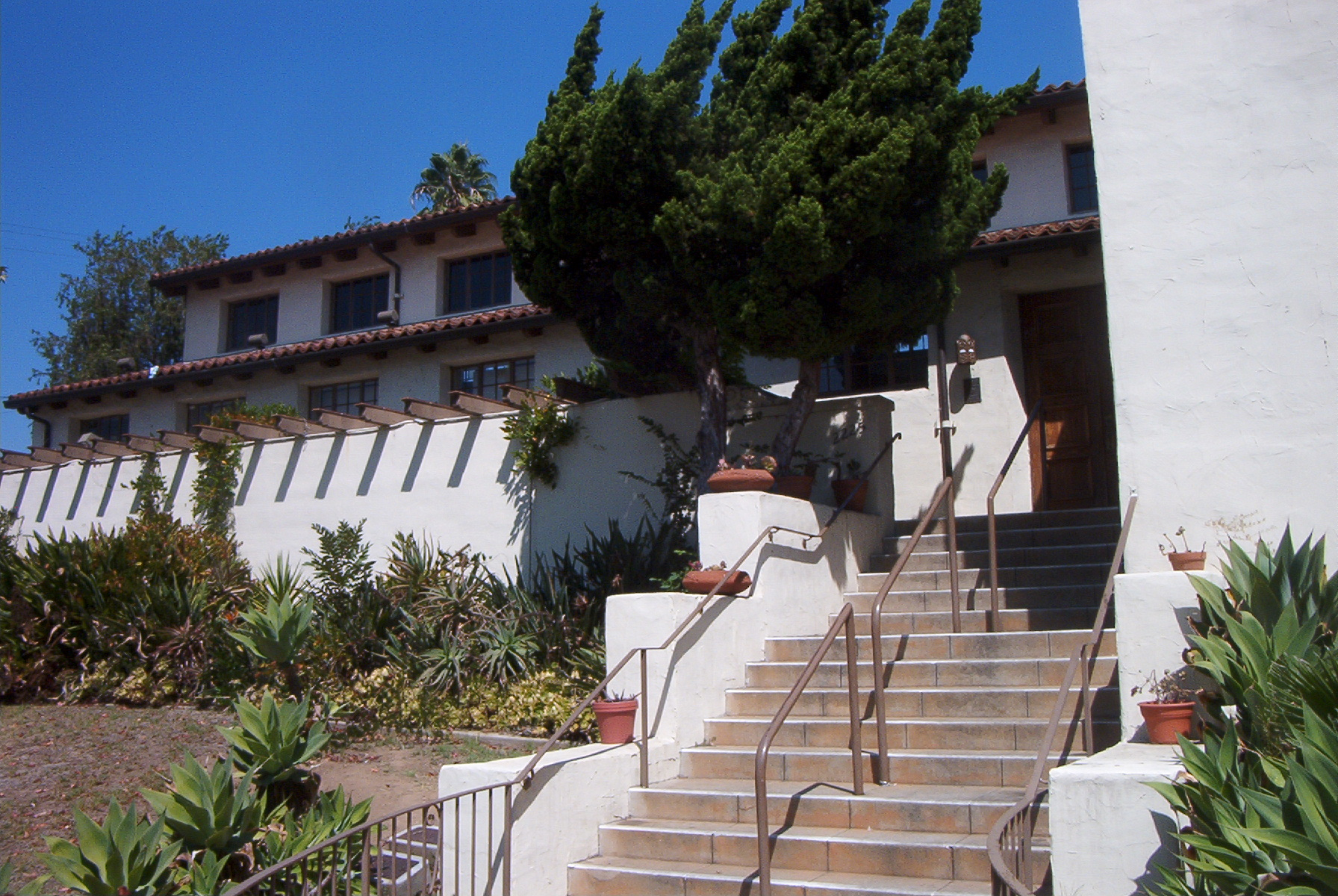
Center for the Arts Eagle Rock, built in a Mission Revival style in 1927.

The neighborhood is home to many historic and architecturally significant homes, many done in the Craftsman, Georgian, Streamline Moderne, Art Deco and Mission Revival styles. There are nineteen Los Angeles Historic-Cultural Monuments in Eagle Rock:

- The Eagle Rock - located at the terminus of Figueroa Street, it is Historic-Cultural Monument #10.
- Eagle Rock City Hall - Located at 2035 Colorado Boulevard, it is Historic-Cultural Monument #59. Once a separate municipality, this was Eagle Rock's original City Hall.
- Eagle Rock Branch Library - Located at 2225 Colorado Boulevard, it is Historic-Cultural Monument #292. The original library, which was built with the aid of a Carnegie grant in 1914, was replaced in 1927 with a new structure which used one wall and the basement of the old library. It now serves as the Center for the Arts Eagle Rock.
- Residence at 1203-1207 Kipling Avenue - It is Historic-Cultural Monument #383.
- Myers House - Located at 4340 Eagle Rock Boulevard, it is Historic-Cultural Monument #461. (Destroyed by arson fire in June 1992.)
- Argus Court - Located at 1760-1768 Colorado Boulevard, it is Historic-Cultural Monument #471.
- Eagle Rock Playground Clubhouse - Located at 1100 Eagle Vista Drive, it is Historic-Cultural Monument #536.
- Eagle Rock Women's Twentieth Century Clubhouse - Located at 1841-1855 Colorado Boulevard, it is Historic-Cultural Monument #537.
- Emil Swanson House - Located at 2373 Addison Way, it is Historic-Cultural Monument #542.
- Eagle Rock Women's Christian Temperence Union Home - Located at 2222-2244 Laverna Avenue & 2225-2245 Norwalk Avenue, it is Historic-Cultural Monument #562.
- Dahlia Motors Building - Located at 1627 W. Colorado Boulevard, it is Historic-Cultural Monument #692.
- Bell Commercial Block - Located at 1948-58 W. Colorado Boulevard, it is Historic-Cultural Monument #734.
- Mc Nary House - Located at 4777 Eagle Rock Boulevard, it is Historic-Cultural Monument #889.
- Waite Residence - Located at 2431 Hill Drive, it is Historic-Cultural Monument #890.
- Castle Craig - Located at 5027 El Varano Aveune, it is Historic-Cultural Monument #931.
- Coons House - Located at 2071 Escarpa Drive, it is Historic-Cultural Monument #989.
- Madilene Vaverka Residence - Located at 2361 Addison Way, it is Historic-Cultural Monument #1102.
- Jennie C. Brayton Building - Located at 5119-21½ Eagle Rock Boulevard, it is Historic-Cultural Monument #1213.
- Jay Risk Standard Oil Co. Service Station - Located at 1659 W. Colorado Boulevard, it is Historic-Cultural Monument #1286.

The Bucket is a historic example of programmatic or novelty architecture meant to look like a 1930s ice chest and usually used as hamburger stand.

== Parks and recreation ==
- Eagle Rock Recreation Center - 1100 Eagle Vista Dr., Los Angeles, CA 90041
- Eagle Rock Dog Park - 1100 Eagle Vista Drive Los Angeles, CA 90041.
- Eagle Rock Hillside Park - North of the Ventura Freeway and South of Valle Vista, Los Angeles, CA 90041.
- Richard Alatorre Park - Figueroa and 134 Freeway, Los Angeles, CA 90041.
- Yosemite Recreation Center - 1840 Yosemite Dr., Los Angeles, CA 90041.

== Education ==
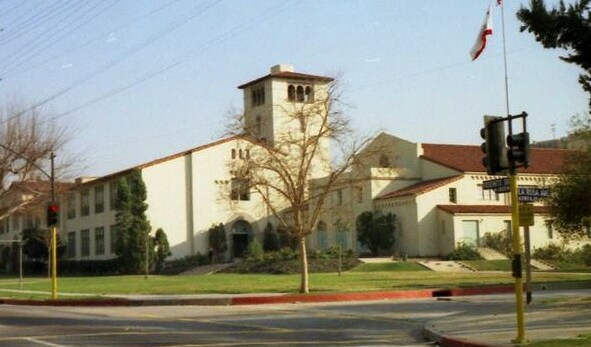
Eagle Rock High School

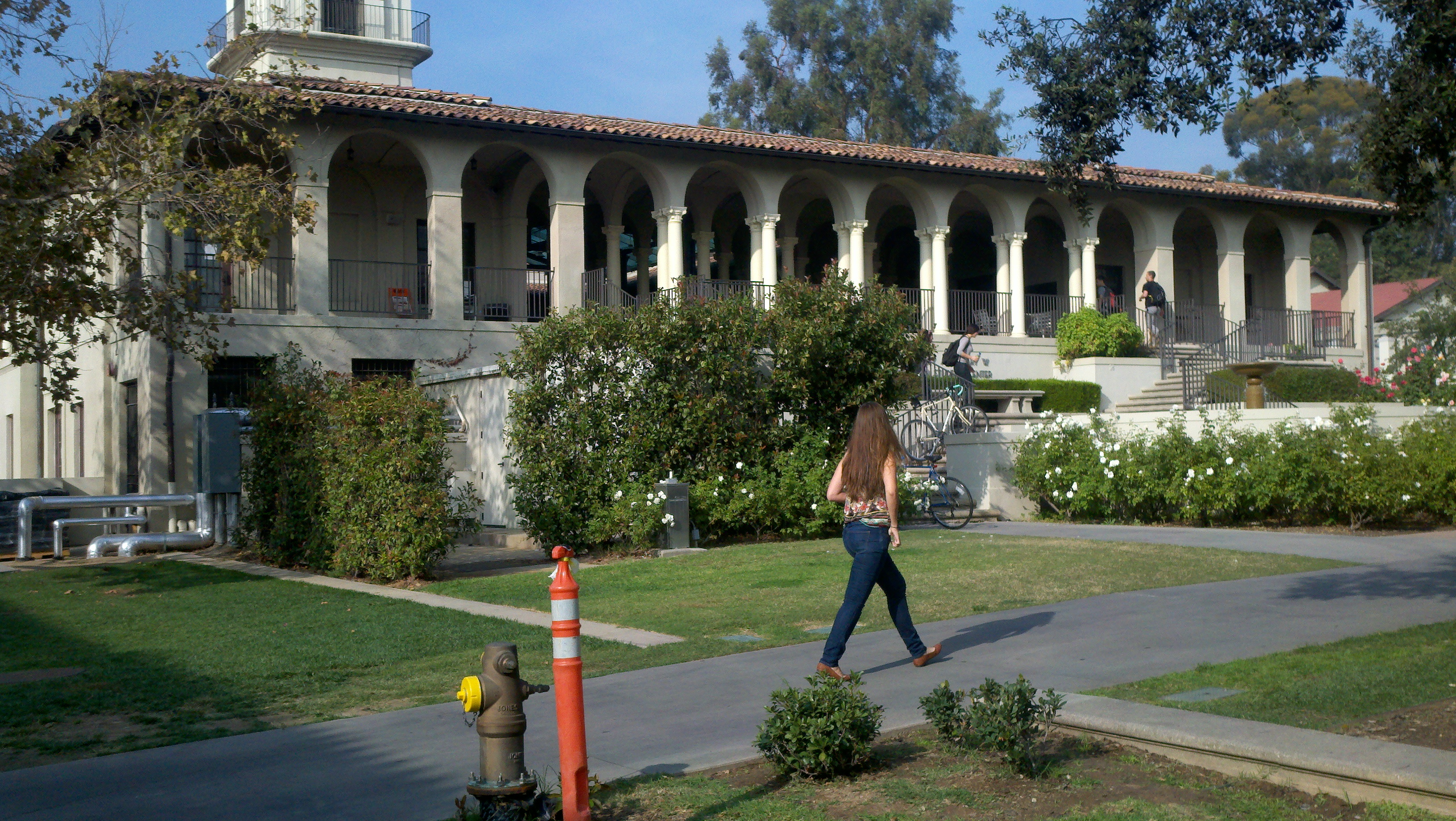
Occidental College

=== Higher education ===
Eagle Rock is the site of Occidental College, which was first established in Boyle Heights in 1887. After a fire destroyed the original campus in 1896, it moved to Downtown Los Angeles, then Highland Park, until reopening permanently in Eagle Rock in 1914. The campus was designed by architect Myron Hunt.

=== Schools ===
Eagle Rock children attend schools in District 4 of the Los Angeles Unified School District.

- Eagle Rock High School, 1750 Yosemite Drive. Eagle Rock High School was built in 1927 by the city of Los Angeles, as promised at the time of Eagle Rock's annexation. The original building was demolished in 1970 over concerns about its earthquake safety. It was replaced by a contemporary brutalist style building at the rear of the same school site.
- Renaissance Arts Academy, charter high school, 1800 Colorado Boulevard
- Dahlia Heights Elementary School, 5063 Floristan Avenue
- Santa Rosa Charter Academy, middle school, 3838 Eagle Rock Boulevard
- Eagle Rock Elementary School, 2057 Fair Park Avenue
- Rockdale Elementary School, 1303 Yosemite Drive
- Delevan Drive Elementary School, 4168 West Avenue 42
- Toland Way Elementary School, 4545 Toland Way
- Annandale Elementary School, 6125 Poppy Peak Drive
- Celerity Rolas Charter School, 1495 Colorado Boulevard. Closed for 2018–2019 school year.

== Tiny Homes Village ==
In March 2022, then Councilmember for Eagle Rock, Kevin De Leon and then Mayor Of Los Angeles Eric Garcetti opened Eagle Rock's Tiny Homes Village, the tenth such community in Los Angeles. These communities are sometimes included as part of the Tiny-house movement. The community was placed near the junction of North Figueroa Street and Colorado Blvd, near the 134 Freeway exit, and just a few hundred yards from the Eagle Rock geological landmark.

Like other Tiny Homes Villages in Los Angeles, the community serves as transitional housing for homeless people formerly living in tents or their cars.

== Notable residents ==
- Ben Affleck, a former Occidental College student, lived on Hill Drive with then-roommate and co-writer Matt Damon while they wrote the script for Good Will Hunting.
- Maria Bamford (comedian)
- Marlon Brando (actor)
- Mike Carter (American-Israeli basketball player)
- John Dwyer (musician)
- Zack de la Rocha (musician)
- Paul Ecke (botanicals)
- M.F.K. Fisher (writer)
- Lloy Galpin (suffragist, teacher)
- Jack Kemp (Congressman, quarterback, HUD Secretary - Occidental College alumnus)
- Terry Jennings (Early Minimalist Composer and Jazz pioneer)
- Carlos R. Moreno (jurist)
- Barack Obama (44th President of the United States - Occidental College student)
- Zasu Pitts (actress)
- Hanson Puthuff (artist)
- Mark Ryden (artist)
- Robert Shaw (conductor)
- John Steinbeck (author)
- Madeleine Stowe (actress)
- Bill Tom (Olympic gymnast)
- Marshall Thompson (actor)
- Dalton Trumbo (screenwriter, author)
- Lindsay Wagner (actress)
- Virginia Weidler (actress)
- Keith Wyatt (Musician, educator)

== See also ==
- Los Angeles Historic-Cultural Monuments on the East and Northeast Side
- List of districts and neighborhoods in Los Angeles
