= Mila Tupper Maynard =

American Unitarian minister, writer, social reformer and suffragist

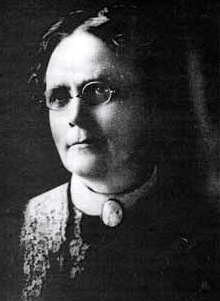
- Born: Mila Frances Tupper; January 26, 1864; Brighton, Iowa, US
- Died: November 12, 1926 (aged 62); Los Angeles, California, US
- Occupation: Unitarian minister
- Spouse: Rezin A. Maynard

Mila Tupper Maynard (née Mila Frances Tupper; January 26, 1864 – November 12, 1926) was an American Unitarian minister, writer, social reformer and suffragist. She is thought to have been the first female minister in Nevada.

== Early years ==
Born Mila Frances Tupper on January 26, 1864, in Brighton, Iowa, she was the daughter of Allen Tupper and Ellen Smith Tupper. Tupper Maynard was greatly influenced by her sister, Eliza Frances Tupper, who was 20 years older and active in establishing churches throughout the Midwestern United States. Tupper Maynard accompanied her sister on these projects and became actively involved in the Unitarian church.

Her ambition was to become a Unitarian minister, but women were not admitted into seminaries for training. Instead, she graduated from Whitewater State Normal School (now University of Wisconsin–Whitewater) in Wisconsin and then went on to earn a Bachelor of Letters degree in philosophy at Cornell University in 1889. Her education allowed her to be ordained as a Unitarian minister. Her first position was pastor in La Porte, Indiana. After serving in La Porte from 1889 to 1891, she moved to Grand Rapids, Michigan, where she remained for about a year.

== Personal life ==
While in Grand Rapids, she met Rev. Rezin A. Maynard, 12 years her senior, who was an alcoholic attorney and counseled the Unitarian Church. They developed a strong relationship, which led Rev. Maynard to divorce his wife. The affair caused a scandal within the Unitarian Church congregation and Tupper Maynard left for Chicago where she worked at the Hull House under Jane Addams’ supervision. Rev. Maynard soon followed Tupper Maynard to Chicago, there on May 24, 1893. Following her time at the Hull House, Tupper Maynard joined the World's Congress of Representative Women at the World's Columbian Exposition in Chicago. During this period, she became closely associated with Christian socialism and joined Christian socialist Myron W. Reed at the Broadway Temple.

== Nevada ==
In 1893, the Maynards served as pastors of the Unitarian Church in Reno, Nevada. While living in Reno, Tupper Maynard taught religious courses at the University of Nevada, established a choir, and administered to patients at the Hospital for the Care of the Indigent Insane. Her services at the hospital led to an appointment by the Nevada governor to attend the Congress of the National Prison Association (now known as the American Correctional Association). She continued providing twice-weekly lectures and numerous socialist-themed lectures. Her topics included property rights, prison reform, government involvement in religious education, and women's and children's rights.

While living in Reno, she began to write extensively on the women's suffrage movement. She addressed the Nevada State Assembly on February 11, 1895, on women's suffrage. Although the assembly rejected a women's suffrage bill soon after her speech, lawmakers later revived the amendment and the Nevada State Senate and Assembly ultimately passed it. Shortly after her landmark speech to the Assembly, Tupper Maynard provided pastoral care for Alice Hartley, who had been arrested on murder charges. She had killed her lover, Reno banker M.D. Foley, after he abandoned her and their baby. Most of Tupper Maynard's congregation and the local community objected to Tupper Maynard’s attention to Hartley, asserting that her actions condoned murder and the woman’s lifestyle as a "fallen woman". Tupper Maynard's colleagues from other faiths criticized her for appearing to sympathize with a criminal.

== Utah and Colorado ==
The criticism prompted the Maynards to leave for Salt Lake City to serve the First Unitarian Church. They later became associated with the People's Temple in Denver. She wrote "The Wider Selfhood" articles in the Rocky Mountain News, and also served as editorial writer on the Rocky Mountain News and the Denver Times staff. She was the author of Walt Whitman The Poet of the Wider Selfhood.

== California ==
By 1907, they moved to Los Angeles, where their socialist advocacy bloomed. The couple were central figures in the Socialist Party and continued working on the suffrage movement. In 1913, the Maynards joined the staff of The Western Comrade, a socialist magazine closely associated with Job Harriman's Llano del Rio utopian cooperative community in the Antelope Valley on the edge of the Mojave Desert. Harriman, a Socialist Party leader and candidate for mayor of Los Angeles, and Frank E. Wolfe, a veteran newspaperman, edited the magazine. Tupper Maynard served as the magazine's drama critic, but she also wrote on women's suffrage and religious issues. By 1914, most of the original staff of The Western Comrade had left the publication. Tupper Maynard then focused her attention on establishing the Unity Church of Santa Monica. The United States' entry into World War I in 1917 proved a pivotal time for socialists. Many members opposed the United States entering the war, but others, like the Maynards, supported the country's involvement, which created a division within the Socialist Party. She quit the Socialist Party in 1918. For the next eight years, she taught religious studies until her death in Los Angeles in 1926.
