= Madison County Courthouse (Iowa) =

- U.S. National Register of Historic Places
- U.S. Historic district – Contributing property
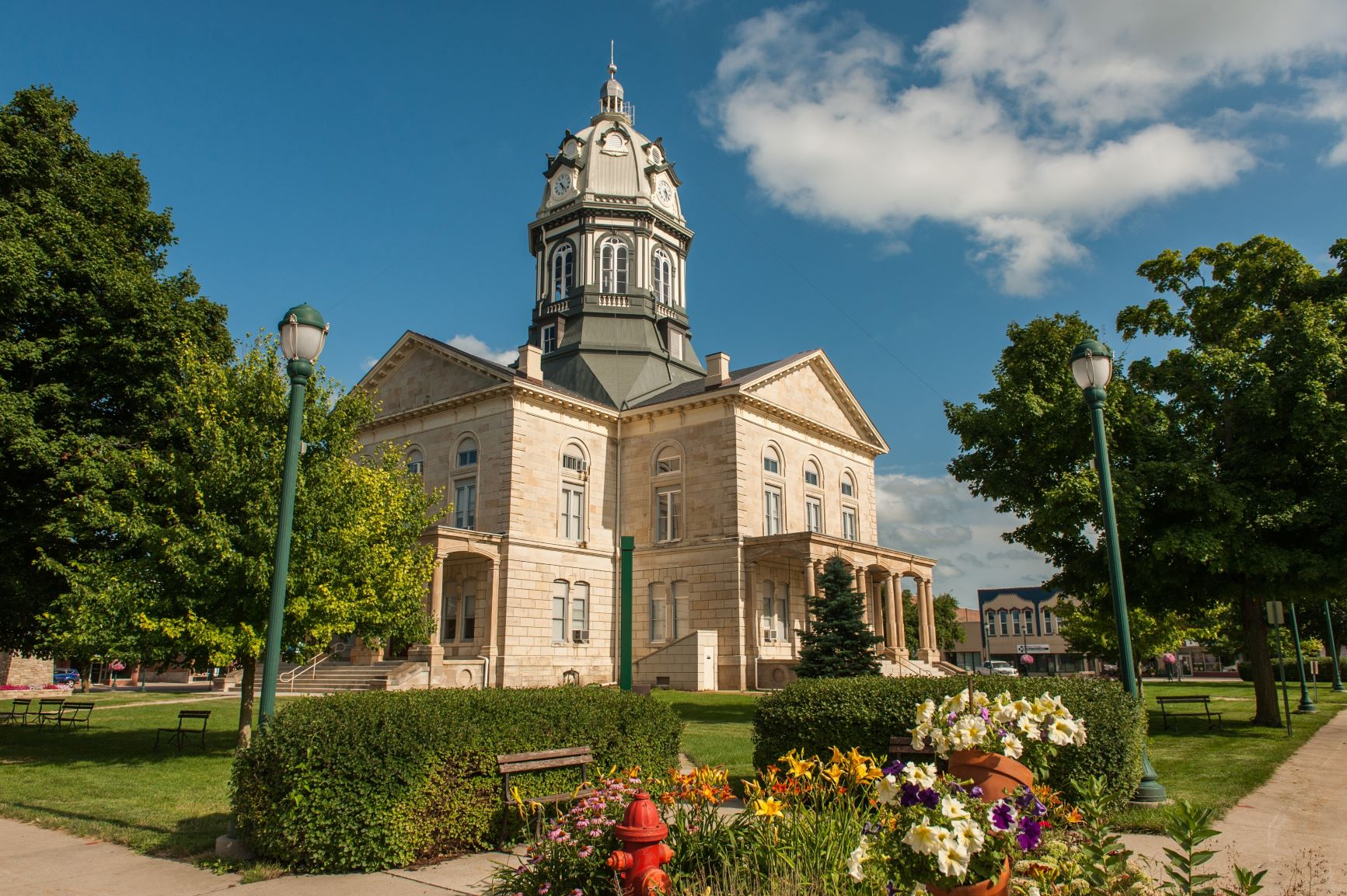

- Location within Iowa Location within the United States
- Location: City Sq. Winterset, Iowa
- Coordinates: 41°20′06″N 94°00′50″W
- Area: less than one acre
- Built: 1876-1878
- Architect: Alfred H. Piquenard
- Architectural style: Renaissance Revival
- Part of: Winterset Courthouse Square Commercial Historic District (ID15000915)
- MPS: County Courthouses in Iowa TR (AD)
- NRHP reference No.: 76000790
- Added to NRHP: August 13, 1976

The Madison County Courthouse is located in Winterset, Iowa, United States. It was listed on the National Register of Historic Places in 1981 as a part of the County Courthouses in Iowa Thematic Resource. It was included as a contributing property in the Winterset Courthouse Square Commercial Historic District in 2015. The courthouse is the third building the county has used for court functions and county administration.

== History ==
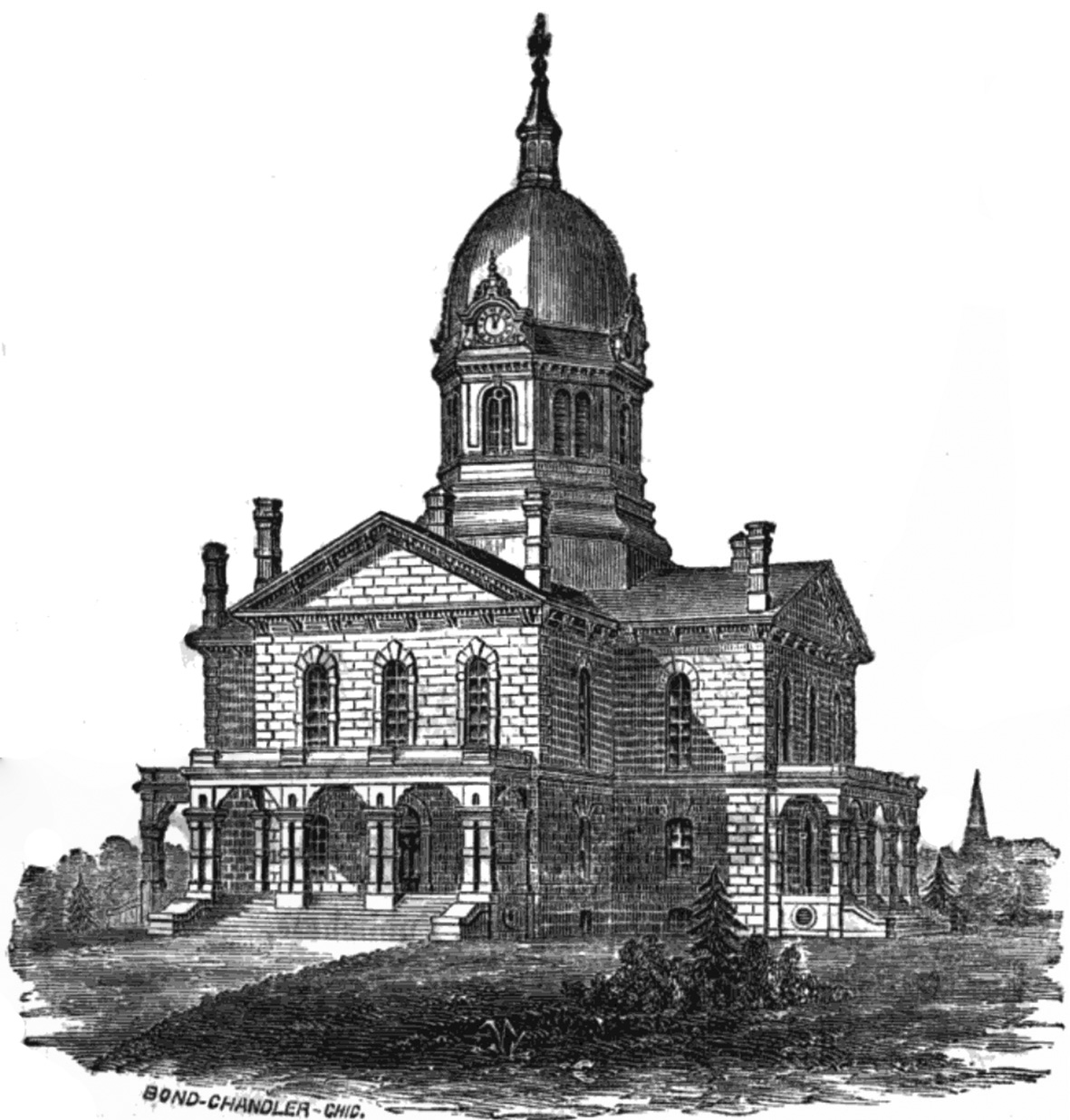
Courthouse in 1869

Madison County was organized in 1850 and Winterset was chosen as the county seat the same year. The first court sessions were held in different stores and taverns. The county's first courthouse was a double log structure built in 1849 on Monumental Square in Winterset. The building was also used for a school, church, and resting spot for travelers.

It was replaced by a stone courthouse designed by G.P. Randall and built beginning in 1868. It was a Greek cross-shaped structure composed of locally quarried limestone that was capped with an octagonal dome. There was a jail on the second floor. The building was destroyed in a fire of October 2, 1875. The remains of the burnt courthouse were salvaged and used in the construction of the new courthouse.

The present courthouse was begun in 1876. It was designed by Chicago architect Alfred H. Piquenard who along with John C. Cochrane was also responsible for the designs of the Illinois and Iowa State Capitols. The building was completed in 1878 for about $120,000. It is located on the same public square as the previous courthouses surrounded by commercial buildings.

== Architecture ==
The courthouse is significant for its architecture. It is noteworthy for its stone construction and its rather simple interpretation of the French Renaissance Revival style. The structure is very similar to the second courthouse, but its decorative details are more refined. The two buildings have the same dimensions. The stone that had been salvaged from the previous courthouse had to be recut. Additional stone was acquired from a local quarry. Each of the four elevations of the building are identical and feature a columned portico over an entryway. A silver-colored dome reaches a height of 136 feet (41 m) and it contains a 1,500-pound (680 kg) bell and a four-faced clock. The interior features woodwork of solid walnut.
