= Iowa County Courthouse =

Iowa County Courthouse may refer to:

- Iowa County Courthouse (Iowa), Marengo, Iowa
- Iowa County Courthouse (Wisconsin), Dodgeville, Wisconsin
