= Washington Downtown Historic District =

Historic district in Iowa, United States

- U.S. National Register of Historic Places
- U.S. Historic district
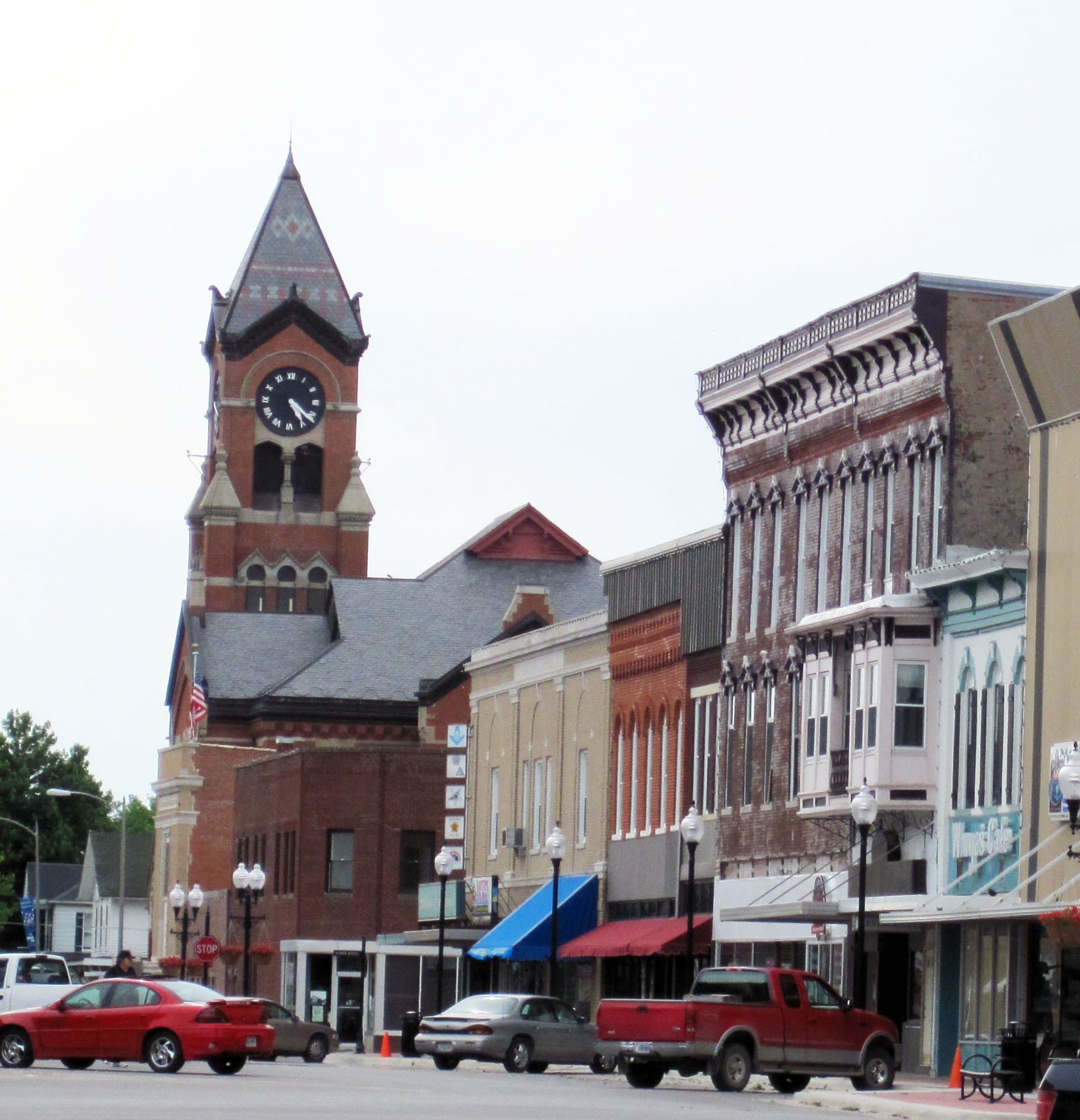

- Location within Iowa Location within the United States
- Interactive map showing the location for Washington Downtown Historic District
- Location: 11 blocks of Iowa & Marion Aves., Washington, Main & 2nd Sts., Washington, Iowa
- Coordinates: 41°17′58″N 91°41′32″W
- Area: 32 acres (13 ha)
- Architect: Foster & Liebbe
- Architectural style: Late Victorian; Late 19th & 20th century Revivals
- MPS: Iowa's Main Street Commercial Architecture MPS
- NRHP reference No.: 13000297
- Added to NRHP: May 22, 2013

The Washington Downtown Historic District is a nationally recognized historic district located in Washington, Iowa, United States. It was listed on the National Register of Historic Places in 2013. At the time of its nomination it contained 122 resources, which included 83 contributing buildings, two contributing objects, one contributing site, 34 non-contributing buildings, one non-contributing structure, and one non-contributing object. The historic district is located in the original town plat, and covers the city's central business district. Washington was platted in 1839 as the county seat for Washington County. Central Park, the town square, is the earliest contributing resource having been platted with the original town. It is the contributing site and contains the two contributing objects: the 1931 Civil War monument and the 1939 fountain. The Washington County Courthouse was located here from 1845 to 1869, when it was relocated to its present location a block away. It is one of the contributing buildings. The oldest extant buildings date to the 1850s.

The district contains a mix of civic and commercial buildings, fraternal clubs, churches, warehouses, automobile-related services, utility companies, theaters, and a newspaper office. The civic buildings include the courthouse, county jail and sheriff's residence, post office, and the public library (both the old and new buildings). The period of significance is from 1839, when the original town was platted, to 1966 when the jail/sheriff's residence was built. The oldest buildings are second generation buildings that replaced frame and log structures, and date to the arrival of the railroad into Washington. The late 19th century and early 20th century was a significant period of new construction and the remodeling of the older buildings. The importance of the automobile was felt beginning in the 1920s. The 1950s and the 1960s was another period of prosperity and building. Late 19th and early 20th-century revival styles and the various Late Victorian styles are dominant.
