= Winterset Courthouse Square Commercial Historic District =

Historic district in Iowa, United States

- U.S. National Register of Historic Places
- U.S. Historic district
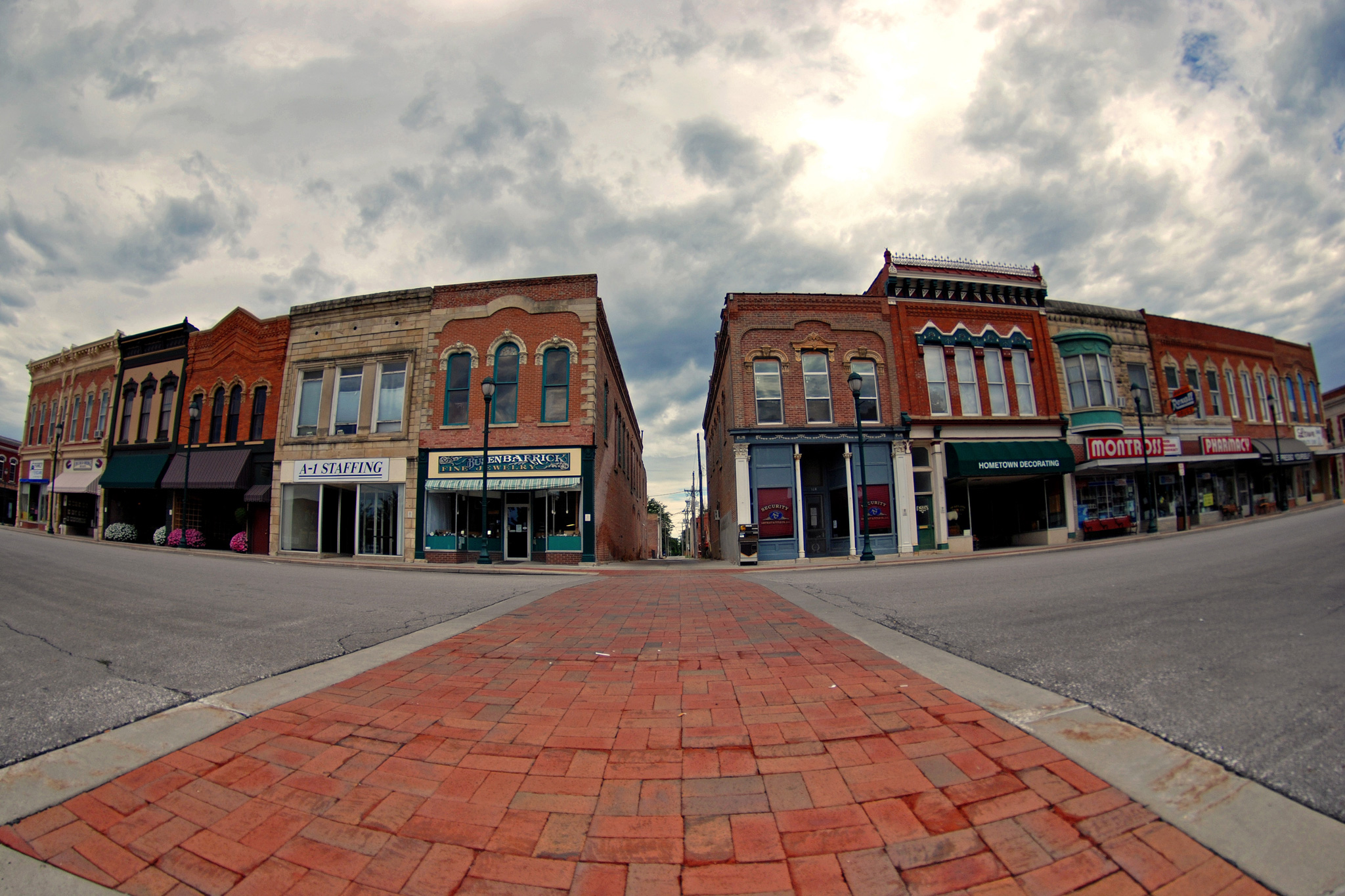

- Location within Iowa Location within the United States
- Location: Roughly bounded by Green & 2nd Sts., 2nd Ave. & alley S. of Court Ave., Winterset, Iowa
- Coordinates: 41°20′05″N 94°00′51″W
- Area: 16 acres (6.5 ha)
- Architect: William Foster; A.H. Piquenard
- Architectural style: Victorian; Late 19th and 20th Century Revivals
- NRHP reference No.: 15000915
- Added to NRHP: December 22, 2015

Winterset Courthouse Square Commercial Historic District is a nationally recognized historic district located in Winterset, Iowa, United States. It was listed on the National Register of Historic Places in 2015. At the time of its nomination the district consisted of 82 resources, including 74 contributing buildings, seven noncontributing buildings, and one noncontributing object. The historic district covers most of the city's central business district in the original town plat. Most of the buildings are two-story, brick, commercial buildings. The commercial Italianate style is dominant, with Queen Anne, Romanesque Revival, and Neoclassical styles included. The Madison County Courthouse (1878) is a Renaissance Revival structure designed by Alfred H. Piquenard. Most of the buildings are brick construction, but four were constructed using locally quarried limestone. The stone buildings include the courthouse, the White, Munger and Company Store (1861), and the Sprague, Brown, and Knowlton Store (1866), all of which are individually listed on the National Register.

The period of significance for the district is 1861 to 1965 when most of the buildings were constructed. Unlike many historic downtowns in Iowa, Winterset replaced its initial frame buildings with masonry buildings because of economic prosperity, and not because of fires. In addition to Piquenard, other architects of note who contributed buildings in the district include William Foster (Crawford/Jefferson Block, 1873; Schwaner/Centennial Block, 1876), L.W. Foster (Madisonian Building, 1872; City Hall Block/Jones & Tidrick, 1875), Joseph S. Blake (Firemen's Hall/City Hall/Light Plant, 1888, 1889, 1923), Frank E. Wetherell (Bevington Building/Masonic Temple, 1914 remodel), and Louis A. Simon (U.S. Post Office, 1935).
