= Hawkeye Insurance Company Building =

- U.S. National Register of Historic Places
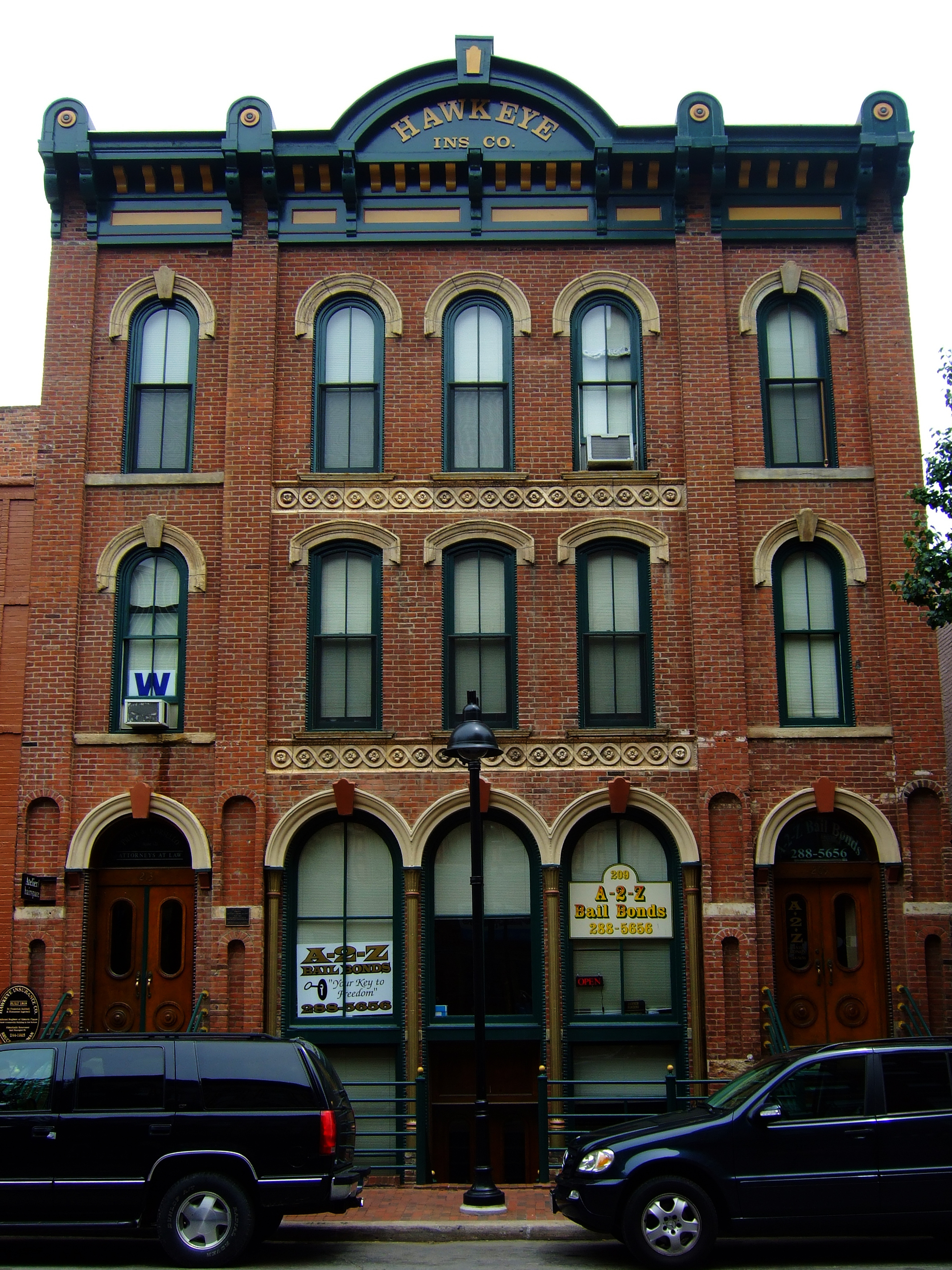

- Location within Iowa Location within the United States
- Location: 209 4th St. Des Moines, Iowa
- Coordinates: 41°35′07.8″N 93°37′18″W
- Area: less than one acre
- Built: 1869
- Architect: William Foster; Proudfoot, Bird and Rawson
- Architectural style: Italianate
- NRHP reference No.: 86000874
- Added to NRHP: April 28, 1986

The Hawkeye Insurance Company Building is a historic building located in Des Moines, Iowa, United States. Completed in 1869, the building housed the first successful casualty insurance company in the city, which grew to be the largest center for insurance companies outside of the east coast. Prominent local architect William Foster designed the building, and it may be the oldest surviving example of his work. It is also the oldest commercial building in the downtown area that maintains its original integrity.

The three-story brick commercial block was designed to be the first part of a larger complex. The Italianate style building features a bracketed cornice and tall thin hooded windows. A two-story annex was completed two years later to the north. Two more three-story sections were completed before 1883. Another prominent Des Moines architectural firm, Proudfoot, Bird and Rawson, converted the building into a hotel in 1913. The original cornice was significantly altered, and the raised basement was eliminated at that time. The building was later converted into an apartment building in the 1960s. In the 1980s, the cornice was restored. The building was listed on the National Register of Historic Places in 1986.
