= Washington County Courthouse (Iowa) =

- U.S. National Register of Historic Places
- U.S. Historic district – Contributing property
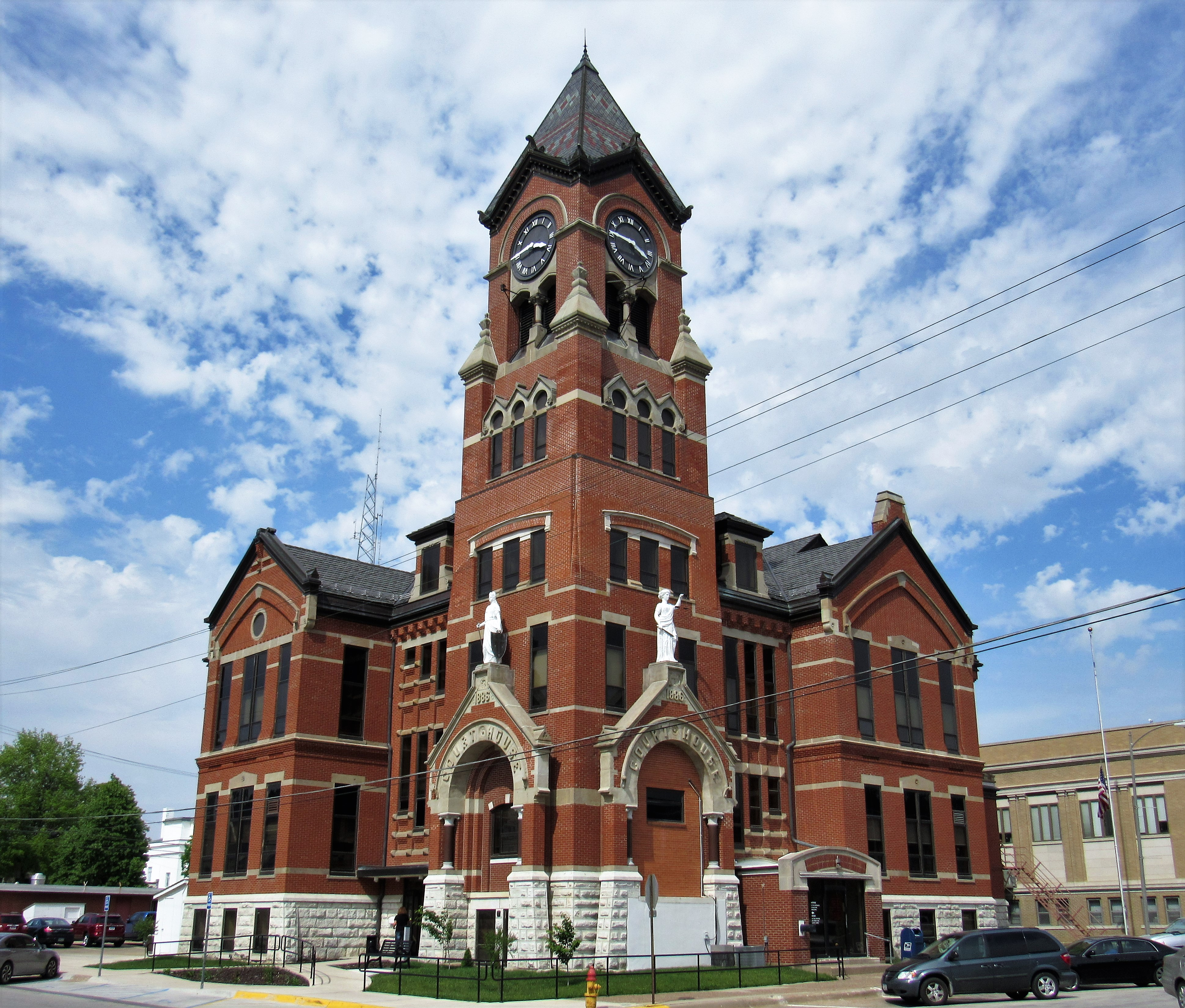

- Location within Iowa Location within the United States
- Interactive map showing the location for Washington County Courthouse
- Location: N. B Ave. Washington, Iowa
- Coordinates: 41°17′58.96″N 91°41′38.18″W
- Area: less than one acre
- Built: 1885–1887
- Built by: T. Colwell, H. Colwell
- Architect: Foster & Liebbe
- Architectural style: Romanesque
- Part of: Washington Downtown Historic District (ID13000297)
- MPS: County Courthouses in Iowa TR
- NRHP reference No.: 81000273
- Added to NRHP: July 2, 1981

The Washington County Courthouse in Washington, Iowa, United States, was built in 1887. It was individually listed on the National Register of Historic Places in 1981 as a part of the County Courthouses in Iowa Thematic Resource. In 2013 it was included as a contributing property in the Washington Downtown Historic District. The courthouse is the third building the county has used for court functions and county administration.

== History ==
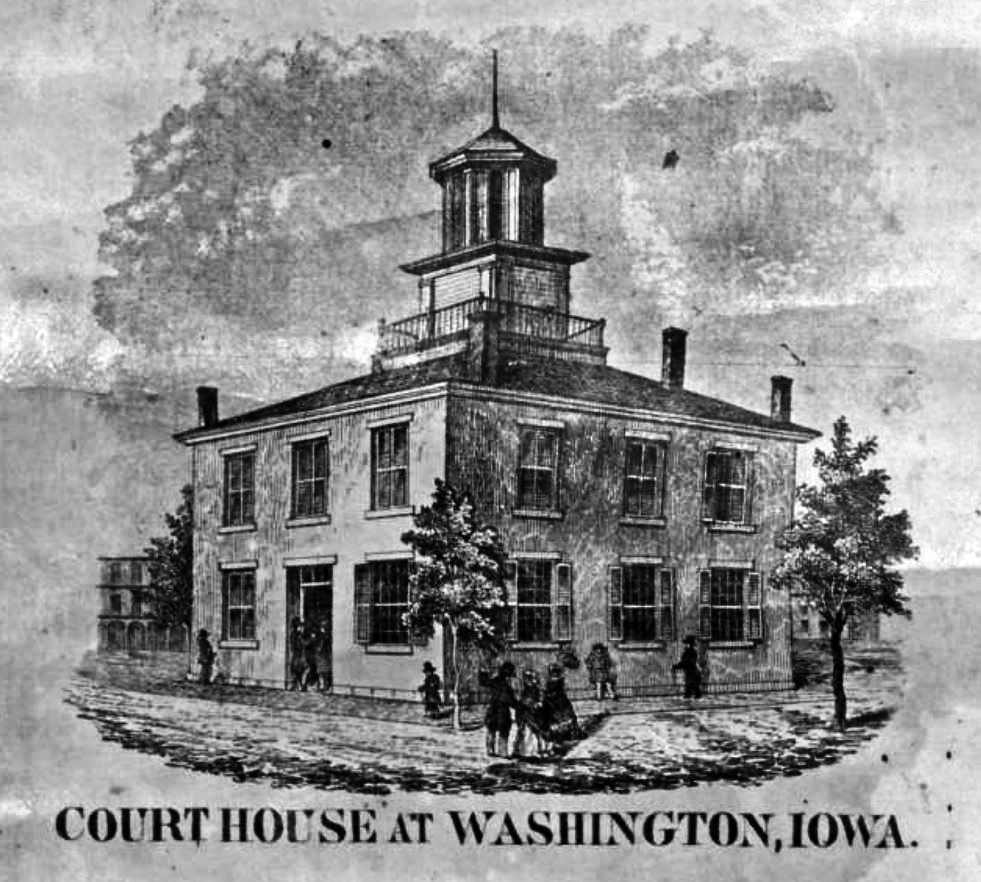
1858 drawing of the 1847 Washington County courthouse.

Washington County's first courthouse was an 28-by-18-foot (8.5 by 5.5 m) frame building built in the 1840s. It was used as a school house and church as well as a courthouse. The second courthouse was built in 1847. The county was not satisfied with the carpentry work performed so they deducted $50 from the cupola alone and $110 on the balance of the building. The present courthouse was built for $75,000 in 1887. It was designed by the Des Moines architectural firm of Foster & Liebbe, and built by Thomas Colwell and Hugh Colwell.

== Architecture ==
The courthouse for Washington County is considered an excellent example of Victorian Romanesque courthouses in Iowa. It features a variety of arch forms, and a three-stage clock tower. It was constructed of locally made bricks and was trimmed in stone. The bell in the clock tower is made of bronze, tin and brass. Statues representing Justice and Liberty are located on the lower level of the tower. The present main entrance was added at a later date. The south and west elevations both have projecting pavilions that terminate in gable ends. The significance of the courthouse is derived from its association with county government, and the political power and prestige of Washington as the county seat.
