= E.R. Hays House =

Historic house in Iowa, United States

- U.S. National Register of Historic Places
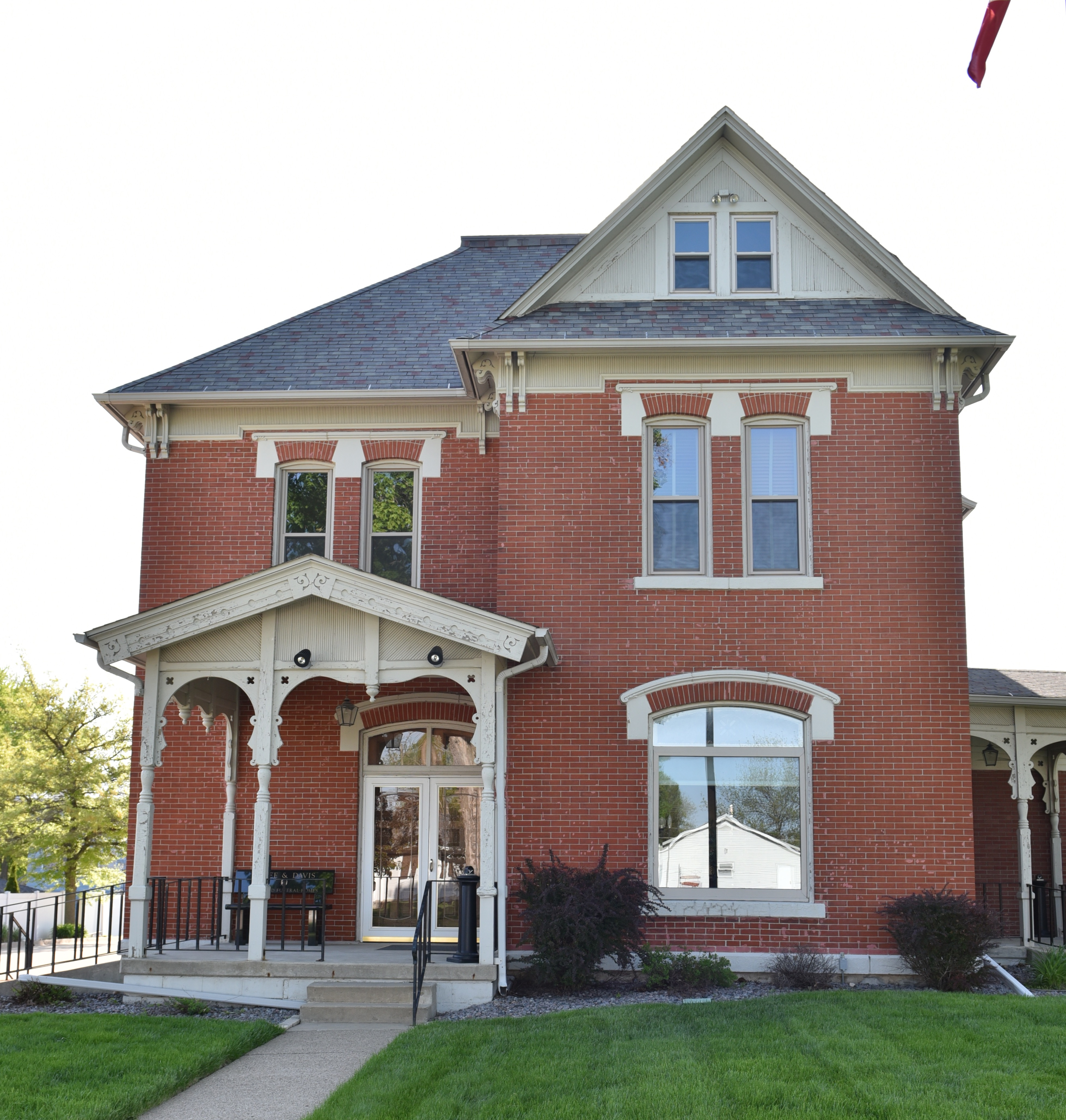

- Location within Iowa Location within the United States
- Location: 301 N. 2nd St. Knoxville, Iowa
- Coordinates: 41°19′15″N 93°05′50″W
- Area: less than one acre
- Built: 1895
- Architect: William Foster; Henry F. Liebbe
- Architectural style: Late Victorian; Italianate
- NRHP reference No.: 84001283
- Added to NRHP: September 27, 1984

The E.R. Hays House, also known as Bybee & Davis Funeral Home, is a historic building located in Knoxville, Iowa, United States. Hays was a local lawyer who served briefly in the United States House of Representatives, replacing Edwin H. Conger who resigned to become the United States Ambassador to Brazil. Hays died a year after the house was completed. The family continued to live here until 1935 when it became the Bybee & Davis Funeral Home. The 2½-story brick structure was designed by the Des Moines architectural firm of Foster & Liebbe in a combination of the Late Victorian and Italianate styles. Victorian eclecticism is featured in the porch and the trimwork, while the Italianate is found in the building's massing. The house was listed on the National Register of Historic Places in 1984.
