= Naylor House =

Historic house in Iowa, United States

- U.S. National Register of Historic Places
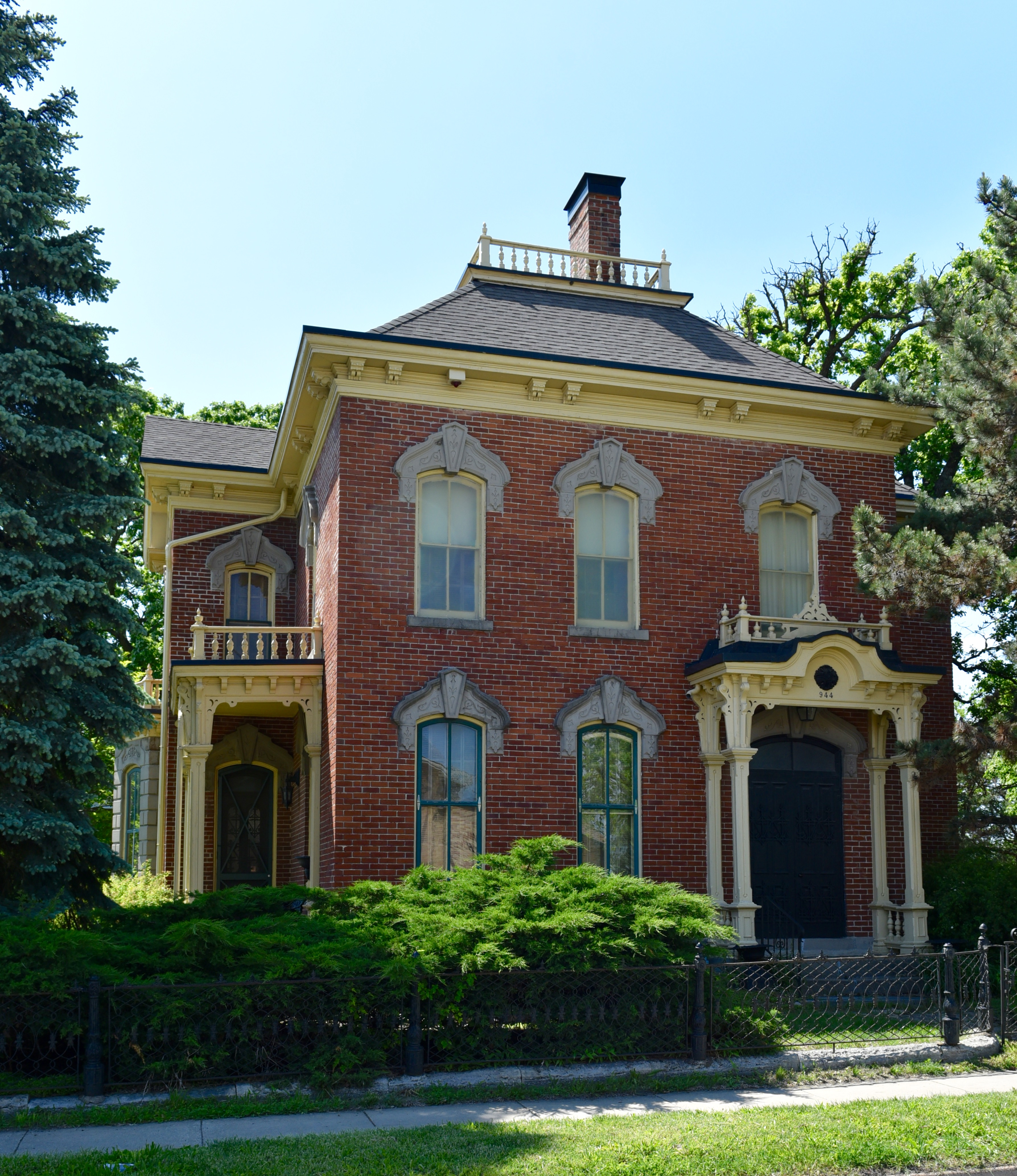

- Location within Iowa Location within the United States
- Location: 944 9th St. Des Moines, Iowa
- Coordinates: 41°35′41.6″N 93°37′46.3″W
- Area: less than one acre
- Built: 1869
- Architect: William Foster
- NRHP reference No.: 74000806
- Added to NRHP: July 10, 1974

The Naylor House is a historic building located in Des Moines, Iowa, United States. Thomas Naylor was born in England and became a prominent grocer in Des Moines. He had this two-story brick Victorian house built in 1869. It is believed to have been designed by Des Moines architect William Foster. The house features an irregular plan, a combination gable-hip roof, two Carpenter Gothic wood porches, a bay window, pre-cast cement window hoods in an Eastlake design, paired roof brackets, and cornice returns on the gable ends. It remained in the Naylor family for almost 100 years. The house was listed on the National Register of Historic Places in 1974.
