= White, Munger and Company Store =

- U.S. National Register of Historic Places
- U.S. Historic district – Contributing property
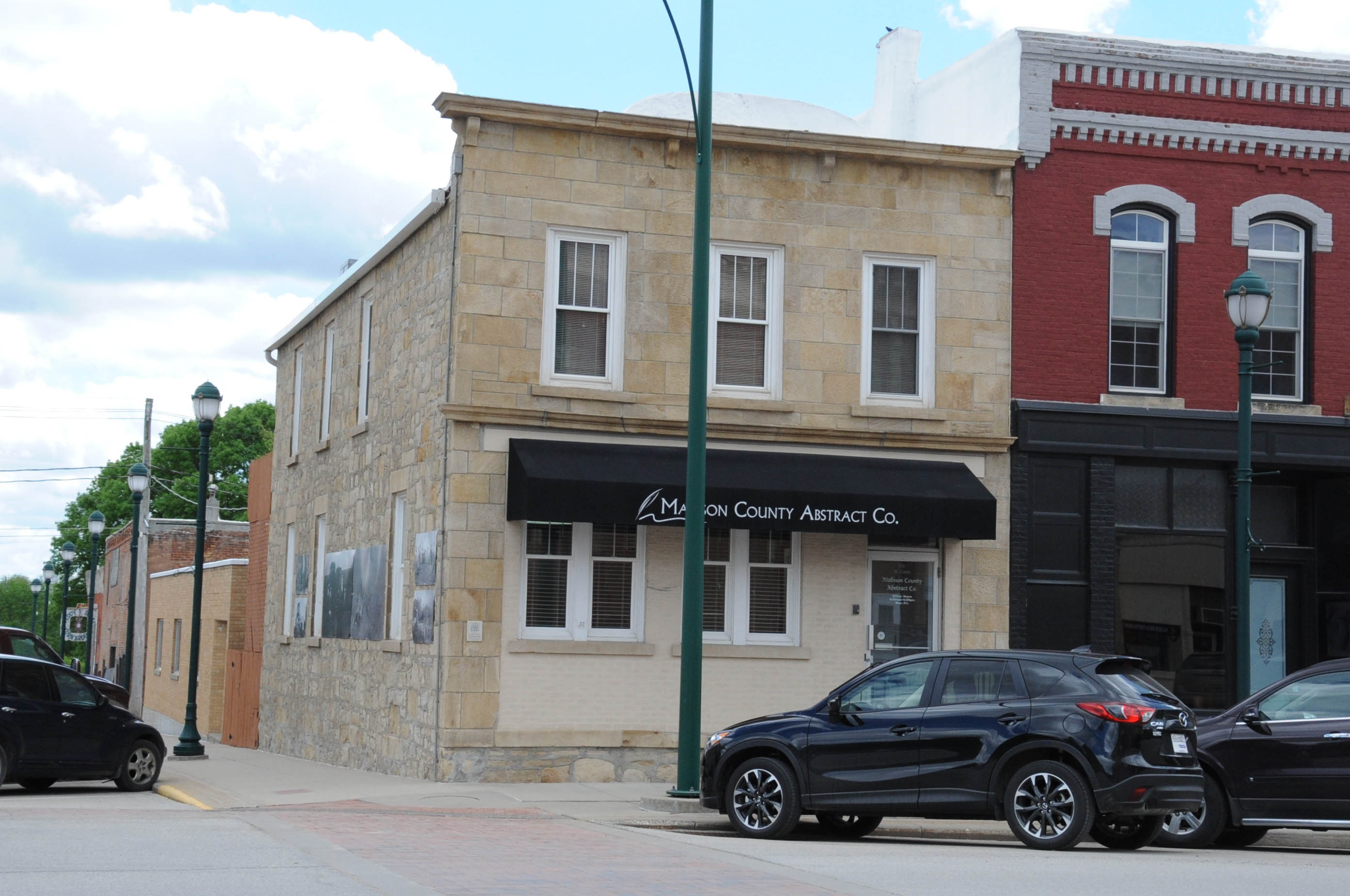

- Location within Iowa Location within the United States
- Location: 102 W. Court; Winterset, Iowa
- Coordinates: 41°20′03″N 94°00′53″W
- Area: less than one acre
- Built: 1861
- Built by: Evan V. Evans
- Part of: Winterset Courthouse Square Commercial Historic District (ID15000915)
- MPS: Legacy in Stone: The Settlement Era of Madison County, Iowa TR
- NRHP reference No.: 87001693
- Added to NRHP: September 29, 1987

The White, Munger and Company Store is a historic building located in Winterset, Iowa, United States. Built in 1861 by Evan V. Evans who owned the property the building sits on, it is an early example of a vernacular limestone commercial building. The two-story structure is composed of locally quarried ashlar and rubble stone. It features a false front that hides the gable roof, a parapet with a bracketed stone cornice and cornice return. The storefront has subsequently been altered. White, Munger and Company operated a woolen mill east of town, and this store was associated with the mill. The building was individually listed on the National Register of Historic Places in 1987, and it was included as a contributing property in the Winterset Courthouse Square Commercial Historic District in 2015.
