= Sprague, Brown, and Knowlton Store =

- U.S. National Register of Historic Places
- U.S. Historic district – Contributing property
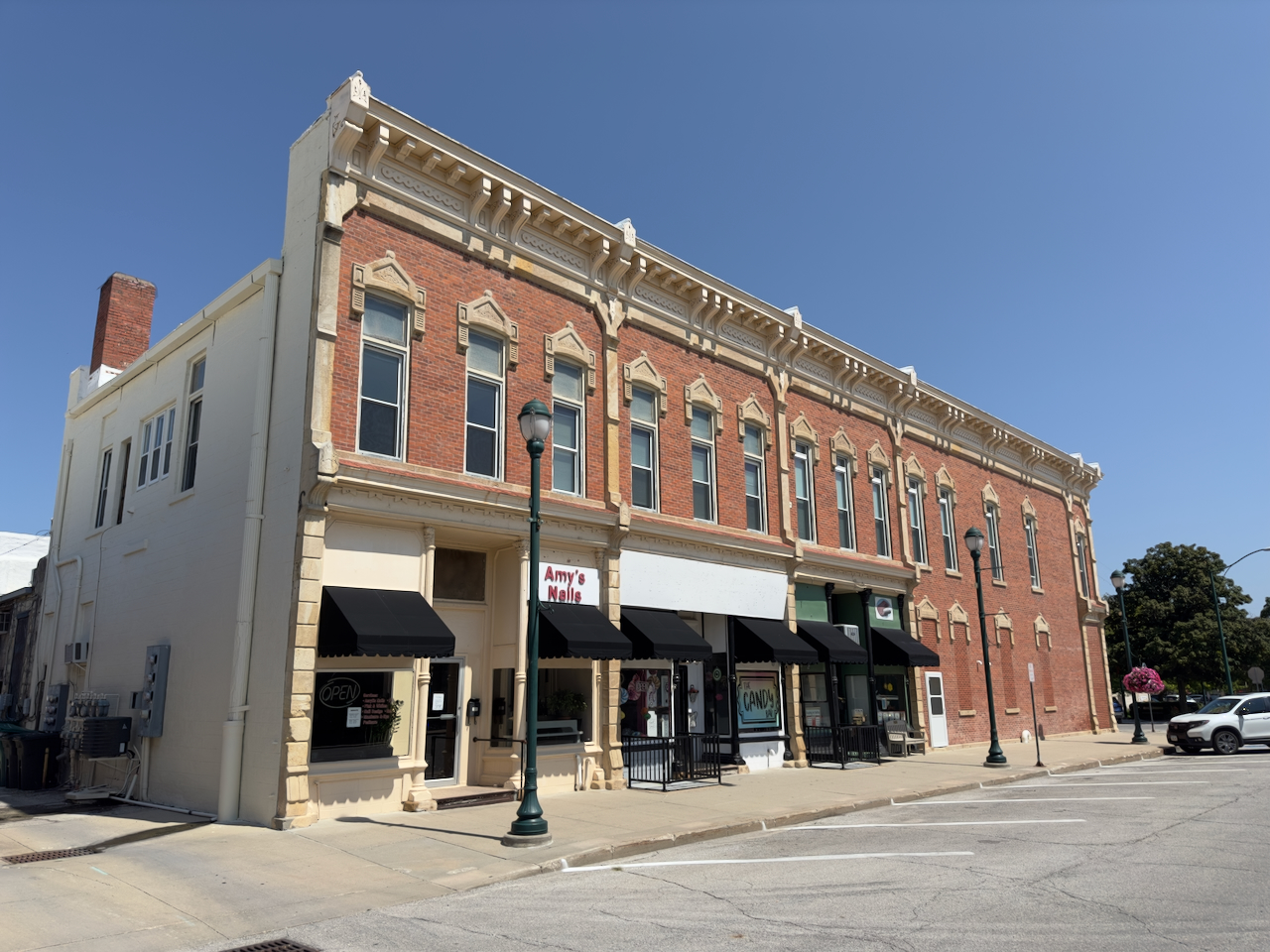

- Location within Iowa Location within the United States
- Location: 1st and Court; Winterset, Iowa
- Coordinates: 41°20′03″N 94°00′52″W
- Area: less than one acre
- Built: 1866
- Built by: David Harris
- Part of: Winterset Courthouse Square Commercial Historic District (ID15000915)
- MPS: Legacy in Stone: The Settlement Era of Madison County, Iowa TR
- NRHP reference No.: 87001690
- Added to NRHP: September 29, 1987

The Sprague, Brown, and Knowlton Store is a historic building located in Winterset, Iowa, United States. Built in 1866 to house a dry goods store, it is an early example of a vernacular limestone commercial building. The two-story structure is composed of locally quarried ashlar and rubble stone. It features chamfered quoins and jambs, and a bracketed stone cornice. Its construction has been attributed to local stonemason David Harris. The storefront has subsequently been altered. The building was individually listed on the National Register of Historic Places in 1987, and it was included as a contributing property in the Winterset Courthouse Square Commercial Historic District in 2015.
