= Clarence Whitehill =

American opera singer (1871–1932)

Clarence Eugene Whitehill
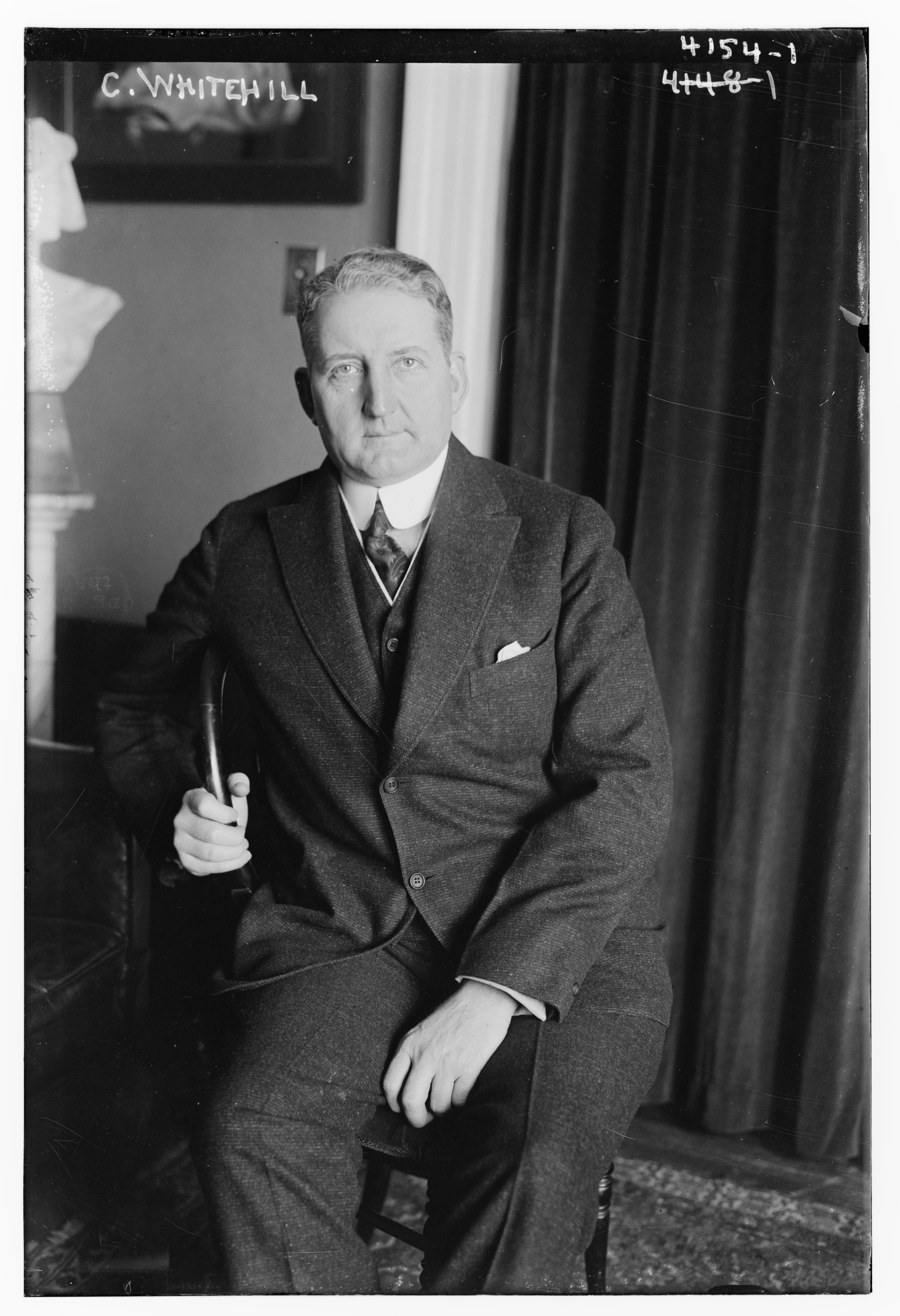
- Whitehill in 1917
- Born: October 20, 1871; Marengo, Iowa
- Died: December 19, 1932 (aged 61); Manhattan, New York City

Clarence Eugene Whitehill (November 5, 1871 - December 19, 1932) was a leading American bass-baritone who sang at the Metropolitan Opera from 1915 to 1932. He sang on both sides of the Atlantic and is remembered for his association with the music dramas of Richard Wagner, and for his recordings of well-known music hall ballads such as "I'll take you home again, Kathleen".

== Biography ==
He was born on November 5, 1871, in Marengo, Iowa.

Whitehill studied in Chicago with L. A. Phelps, and then in Paris with Giraudet and Giovanni Sbriglia. In 1898, he made his stage debut at La Monnaie in Brussels, as Capulet in Roméo et Juliette. He sang Nilakhanta at the Opéra-Comique the next year, becoming the first ever American singer to perform in that theatre.

Whitehill travelled to Frankfurt, Germany, to study with Julius Stockhausen. He appeared on stage in several German cities, while studying the Wagnerian baritone and bass-baritone roles. In 1904, he debuted at the Bayreuth Festival as Wolfram in Tannhäuser. Later, he sang Amfortas and Wotan.

Whitehill went on to appear with considerable success at the Royal Opera House, Covent Garden, London, in the first Ring Cycle sung in the English. He decided, however, that the time had come for him to leave Europe and return to America, and he made his Metropolitan Opera debut. on November 25, 1909.

He married Isabel Rush on July 24, 1912. She was the widow of James Rervey Simpson.

He would enjoy a long and praiseworthy career at the Met despite a throat ailment which periodically affected one of his vocal cords. He was especially acclaimed in such taxing Wagnerian parts as Hans Sachs in Die Meistersinger von Nürnberg, but he also appeared in the Met premiere of the French operas Louise (in 1921) and Pelléas et Mélisande (in 1925), and in the North American premiere of Erich Wolfgang Korngold's one-act opera Violanta (on 5 November 1927).

He was to remain on the Met's roster of singers until May 14, 1932, when he retired in a dispute.

He died on December 19, 1932, in Manhattan, New York City.

== Legacy ==
Whitehill was notable for the tonal beauty of his large voice, the nobility of his singing style and the dignity of his stage demeanour. His diction, phrasing and enunciation were considered to be exemplary, too, while his interpretations were said to have a poignant intensity which set them apart from those of his contemporaries. Fortunately, Whitehill made a number of gramophone records prior to World War I which display something of his greatness as a Wagnerian singer.
