= Youngerman Block =

- U.S. National Register of Historic Places
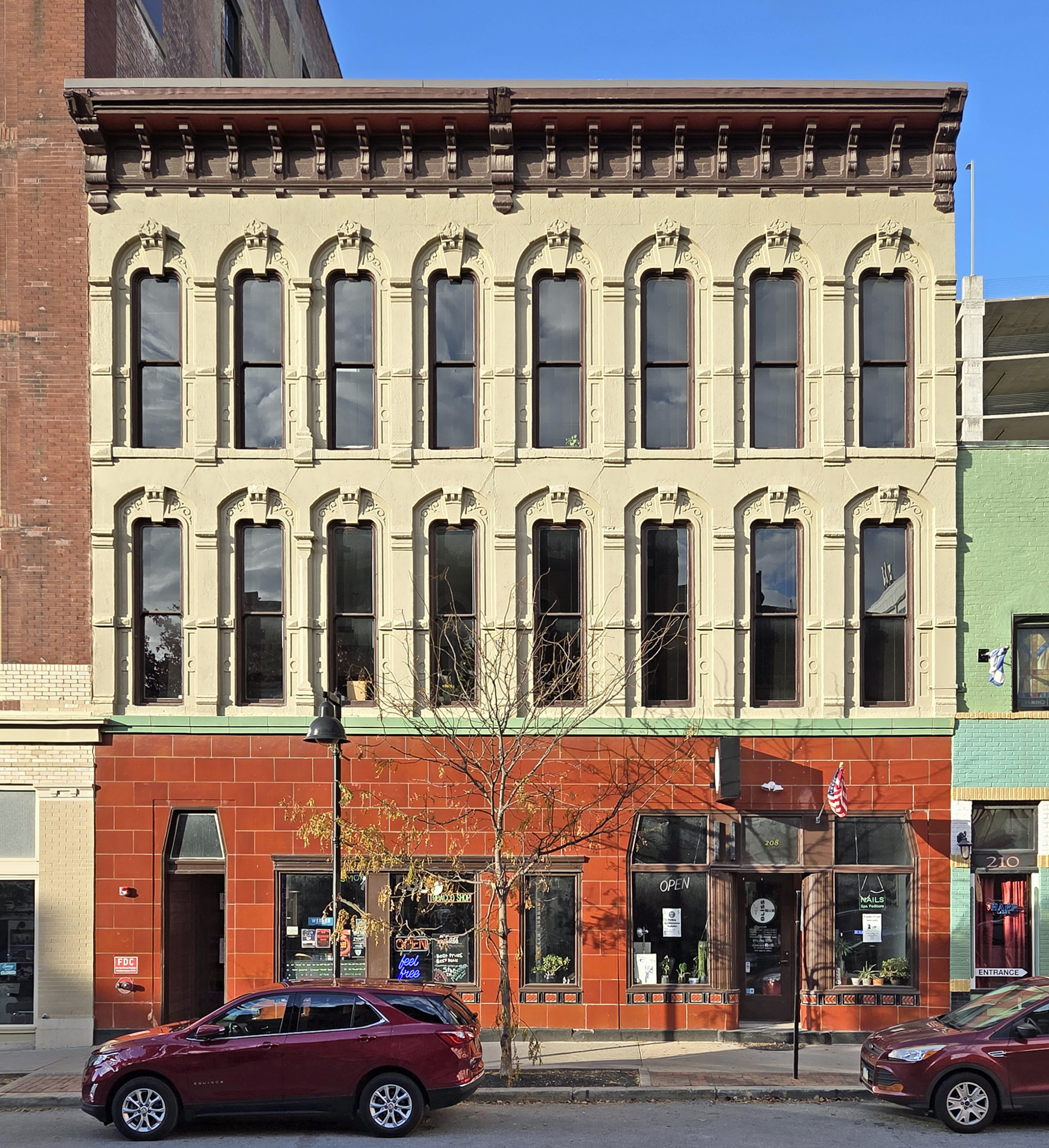
- The Youngerman Block from the east-northeast

- Location within Iowa Location within the United States
- Location: 206–208 4th Street, Des Moines, Iowa
- Coordinates: 41°35′7.3″N 93°37′19.3″W
- Area: less than one acre
- Built: 1876
- Built by: Conrad Youngerman
- Architect: William Foster
- Architectural style: Italianate, Art Deco
- NRHP reference No.: 09000405
- Added to NRHP: June 10, 2009

Youngerman Block is a three-story commercial building in downtown Des Moines, Iowa, United States, incorporating Italianate architecture with later alterations that introduced Art Deco detailing. Built in 1876, the Youngerman Block was designed by architect William Foster (1842–1909) for Conrad Youngerman.

== Conrad Youngerman ==
Youngerman was a local builder, born in Wichdorf, Germany, in 1833 who had apprenticed as a stonecutter in Germany. Following military service in Germany he emigrated to the United States in 1854 and moved to Iowa with his new wife Meine in 1856. He became a prominent local stonemason, participating in the construction of the original Polk County Courthouse in 1861, and establishing a brickmaking business. Youngerman's materials business expanded into the production of "asbestine", an artificial building stone that could be used in lieu of natural stone, which was expensive and scarce in central Iowa.

Youngerman served three terms as a city alderman and was a trustee of two banks. Two blocks from the present Youngerman Block, Youngerman built another building with the same name, an eight-story building completed in 1891, now demolished. An 1896 account stated that Youngerman "has erected many of the large public business and manufacturing buildings, also many of the fine residences, churches and school-houses of Des Moines..." About the 1891 building it states "In 1890 he erected and still owns the Youngerman Block, a handsome brick block, eight stories in height, 132 feet front on Fifth street and 66 feet on Mulberry street. It contains about 140 business offices." Youngerman died in 1901.

== Description ==
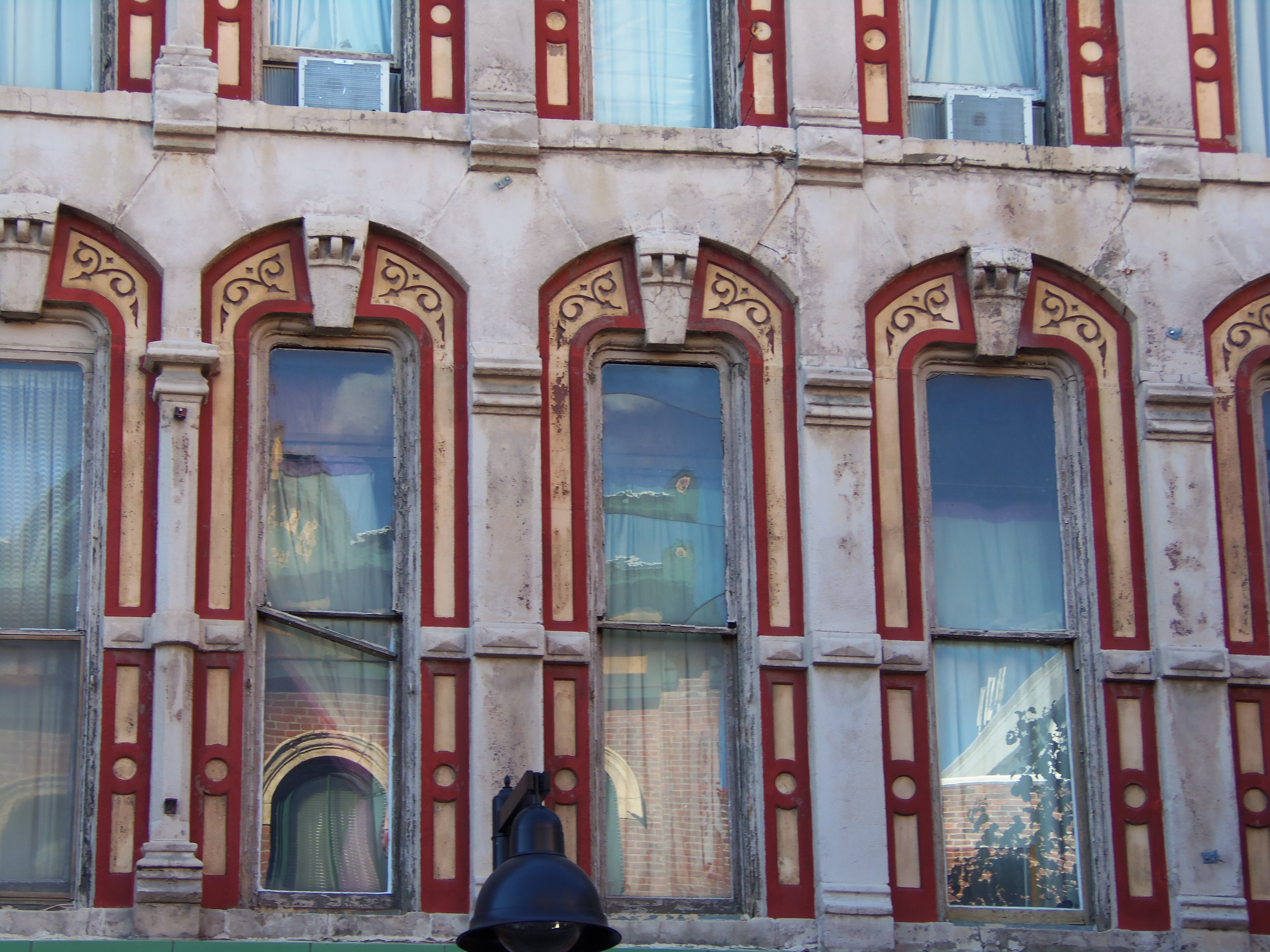
Detail of the Italianate fenestration

The Youngerman Block is a three-story masonry structure abutting the NRHP-listed Randolph Hotel, which lies to its south on 4th Street. The ground floor is arranged as two retail tenant spaces fronting on the street. The southern unit, 206 4th Street, is 67 feet (20 m) deep, while the northern unit, 208, is 78 feet (24 m) deep. Upper levels vary in size, with three stories over 208, but the rearmost 20 feet (6.1 m) of 206 only one story. The upper levels are faced with "asbestine" made by Youngerman's manufacturing operation, all presently painted gray. The upper levels are dominated by arched windows with prominent, intricately detailed surrounds, more elaborate on the third floor. The top of the facade is ornamented by a pressed metal cornice. Larger brackets at each end and in the middle help to define the building's two primary bays. The upper two floors on the street side feature eight tall, narrow arched windows with flattened tops on each level.

The ground-floor storefront was remodeled in 1935, using new masonry and red ceramic tile block. The new façade, which incorporates Art Deco motifs, is in notable contrast with the upper levels, but is itself a notable example of the style in Des Moines. The transoms at the leftmost door at 206 and at 208's storefront are inclined inward in an apparent Egyptian reference. Decorative green tiles line the sills under the store windows. The rear and side elevations are of common brick with irregular placement of sash windows.

The interiors have been extensively altered. In the early 20th century the upper levels were joined to the adjoining Randolph Hotel. The Randolph at one time was planned to be expanded over the lot occupied by the Youngerman Block. The connection apparently removed this requirement, but the differences in floor elevations between the buildings required stairs to transition. Some of the transoms and trim remain from the original building on the upper floors, particularly at exterior windows. Presently a wide main hallway runs from the Randolph across the upper floors, bending and narrowing over 208 to run to the rear of the building, with a stairway over 206.

== Present ==
The Youngerman Block was listed on the National Register of Historic Places on June 10, 2009.
