= Herndon Hall =

Historic house in Iowa, United States

- U.S. National Register of Historic Places
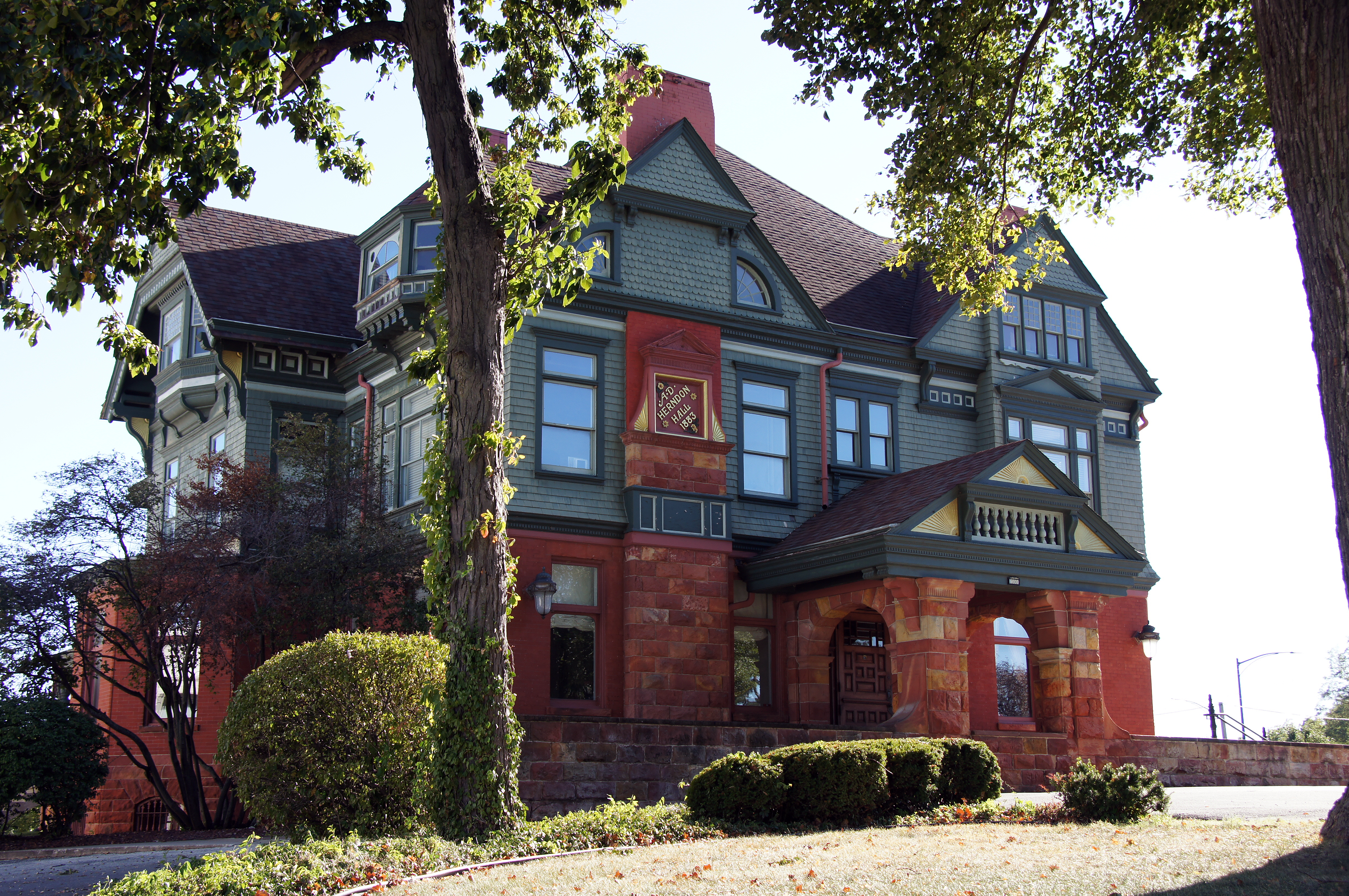

- Location within Iowa Location within the United States
- Location: 2000 Grand Ave. Des Moines, Iowa
- Coordinates: 41°35′2.1″N 93°38′37.7″W
- Built: 1881
- Architect: Foster & Liebbe
- Architectural style: Queen Anne
- NRHP reference No.: 77000547
- Added to NRHP: July 27, 1977

Herndon Hall, also known as the Bergmann Mansion, is an historical residential building located in Des Moines, Iowa, United States. The house was built in 1881 in the Queen Anne style. It was designed by the Des Moines architectural firm of Foster & Liebbe for attorney Jefferson Polk. He named the house after his wife, Julia Herndon. Over the years it has been the home of three bishops of the Diocese of Des Moines, a clothing store, and it served as the National Headquarters for Better Homes & Gardens Real Estate Service. It now houses a cosmetic & reconstructive surgery practice It was listed on the National Register of Historic Places in 1977.
