= Blair House (Washington, Iowa) =

Historic house in Iowa, United States

- U.S. National Register of Historic Places
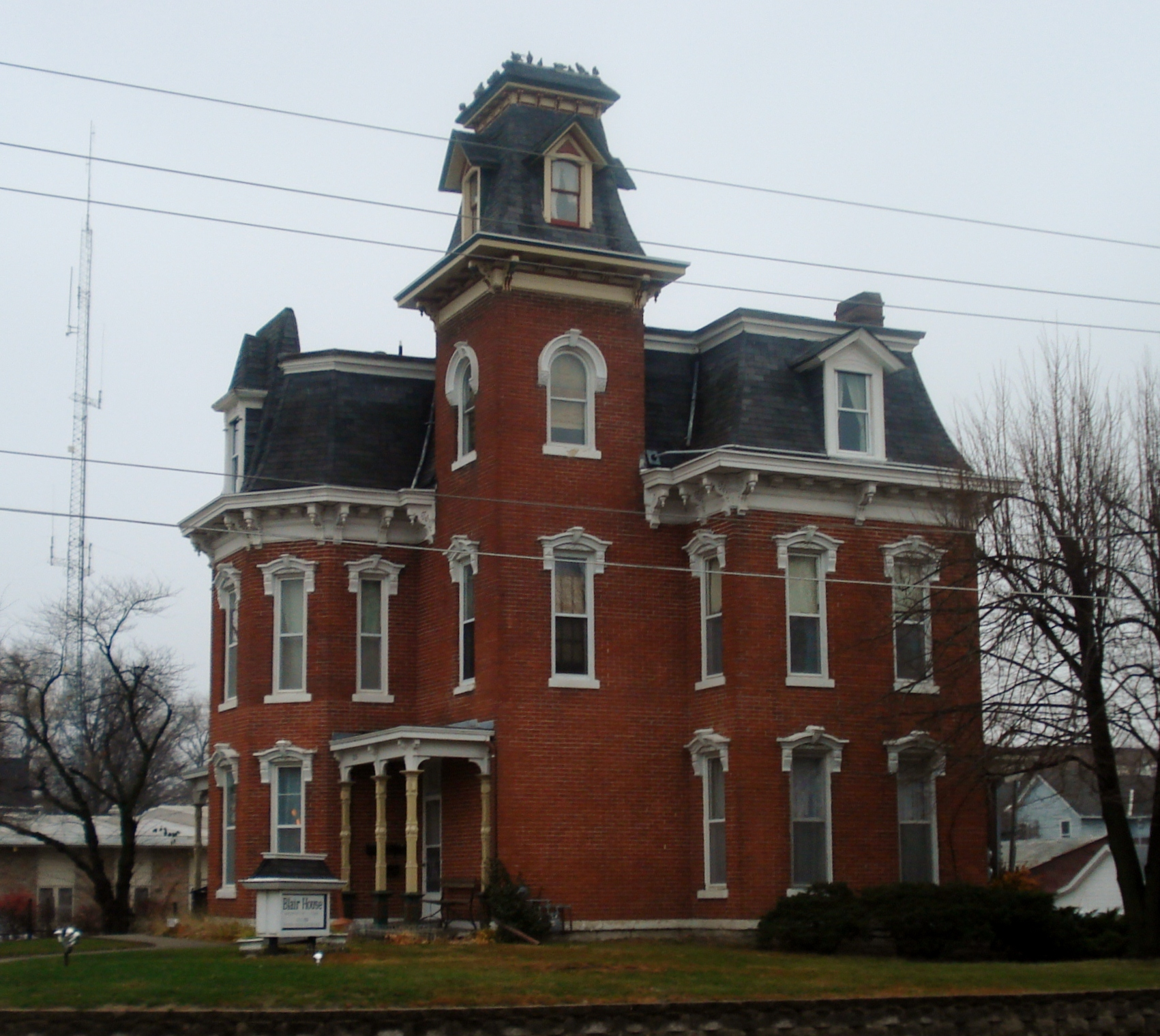

- Location within Iowa Location within the United States
- Location: E. Washington St. and S. 2nd Ave., Washington, Iowa
- Coordinates: 41°17′53″N 91°41′23″W
- Area: less than one acre
- Built: 1880-1881
- Architect: William Foster
- Architectural style: Second Empire
- NRHP reference No.: 73000741
- Added to NRHP: June 4, 1973

The Blair House of Washington, Iowa, formerly used as the town's City Hall, was built in 1881. It was listed on the National Register of Historic Places in 1973. The building has served several different functions in its history. It was built as a private residence by a local financier and realtor Winfield Smouse. The Blair family lived here from 1882 to 1891, followed by C.J. Wilson. It then housed the Commercial Club from 1903 to 1926 and they added a gymnasium and club rooms on the south side. The building housed the Washington City Hall from 1926 to 1972. They added a larger front porch, a fire station to the east side of the house and hung the fire bell in the tower. It is one of the few Victorian houses that remains in this area. The 2½ story structure follows an irregular plan. Its exterior is composed of brick and both the main block and the tower are capped with a mansard roof. Des Moines architect William Wagner said the Blair House is a "little gem-a miniature Terrace Hill", a reference to the present Iowa Governor's Mansion.
