= William Foster (Iowa architect) =

American architect and theatre manager (1842–1909)

- Born: July 21, 1842; Little Neck, New York, United States
- Died: December 30, 1909 (aged 67); Des Moines, Iowa, United States
- Occupation: Architect
- Practice: W. Foster & Company; William Foster; Foster & Liebbe; Foster, Liebbe & Smith; Foster, Liebbe & Company

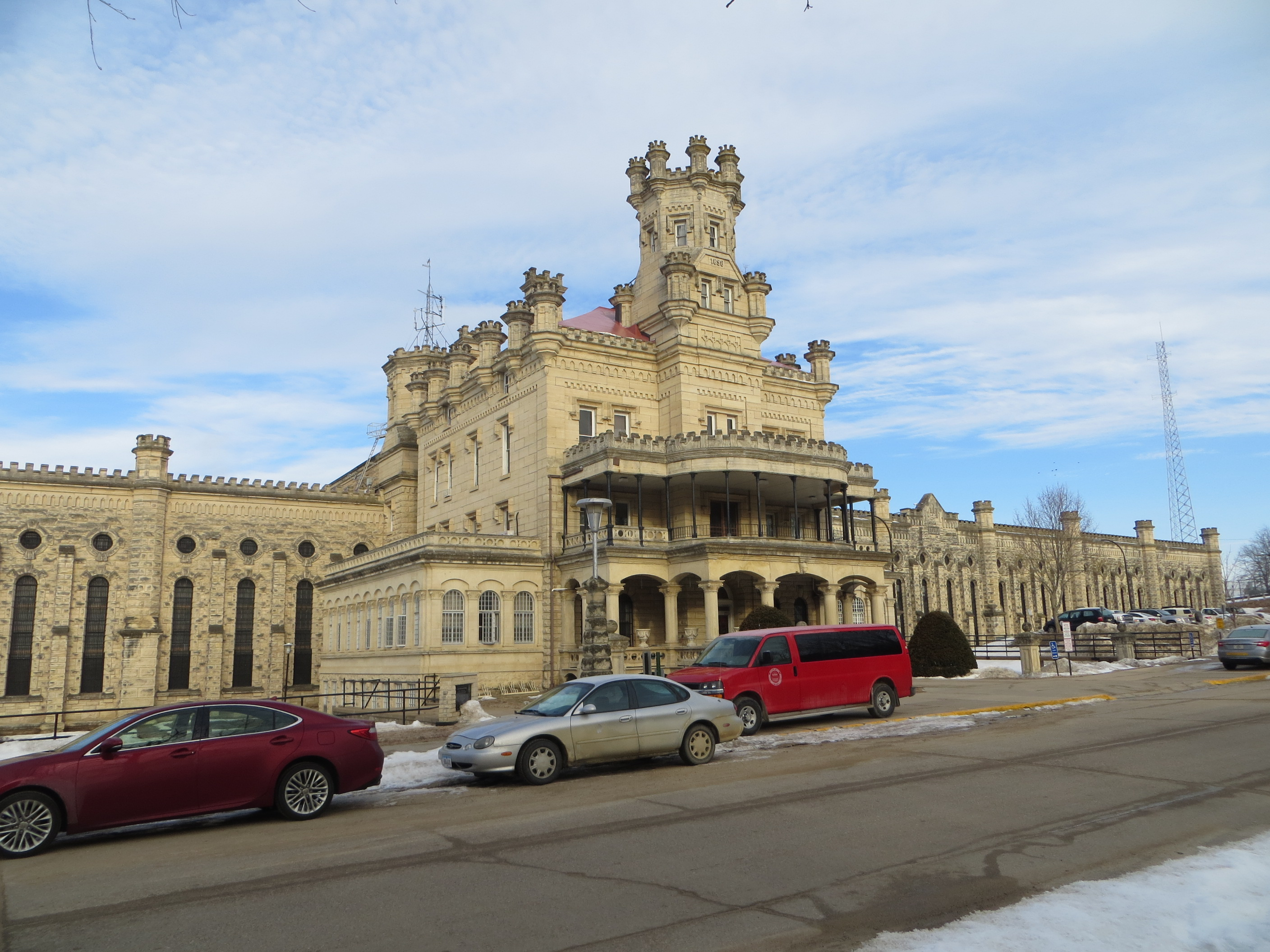
The Anamosa State Penitentiary, designed by Foster in the Gothic Revival style and completed in phases beginning in 1881

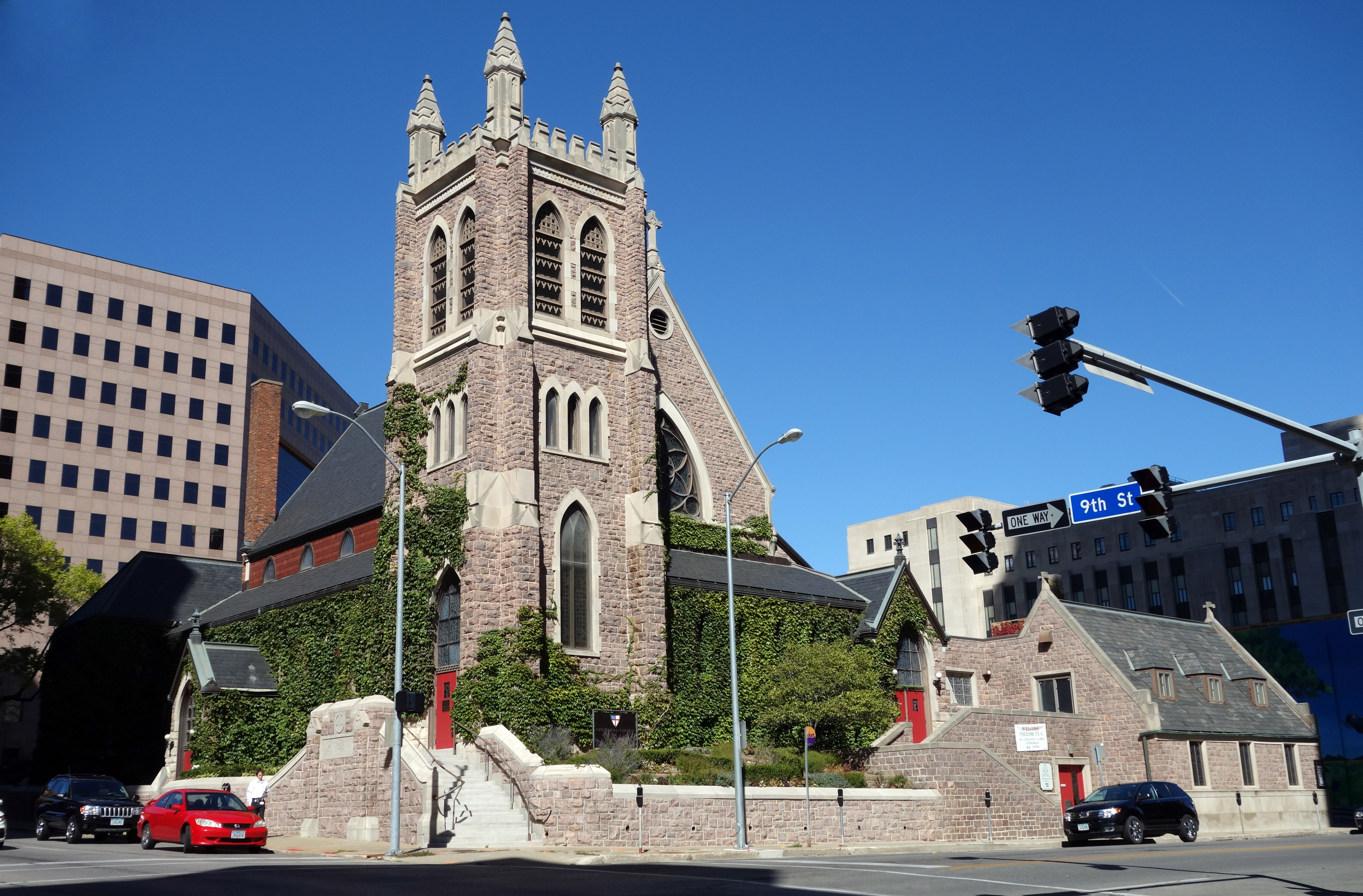
The Cathedral Church of St. Paul in Des Moines, designed by Foster & Liebbe in the Gothic Revival style and completed in 1885

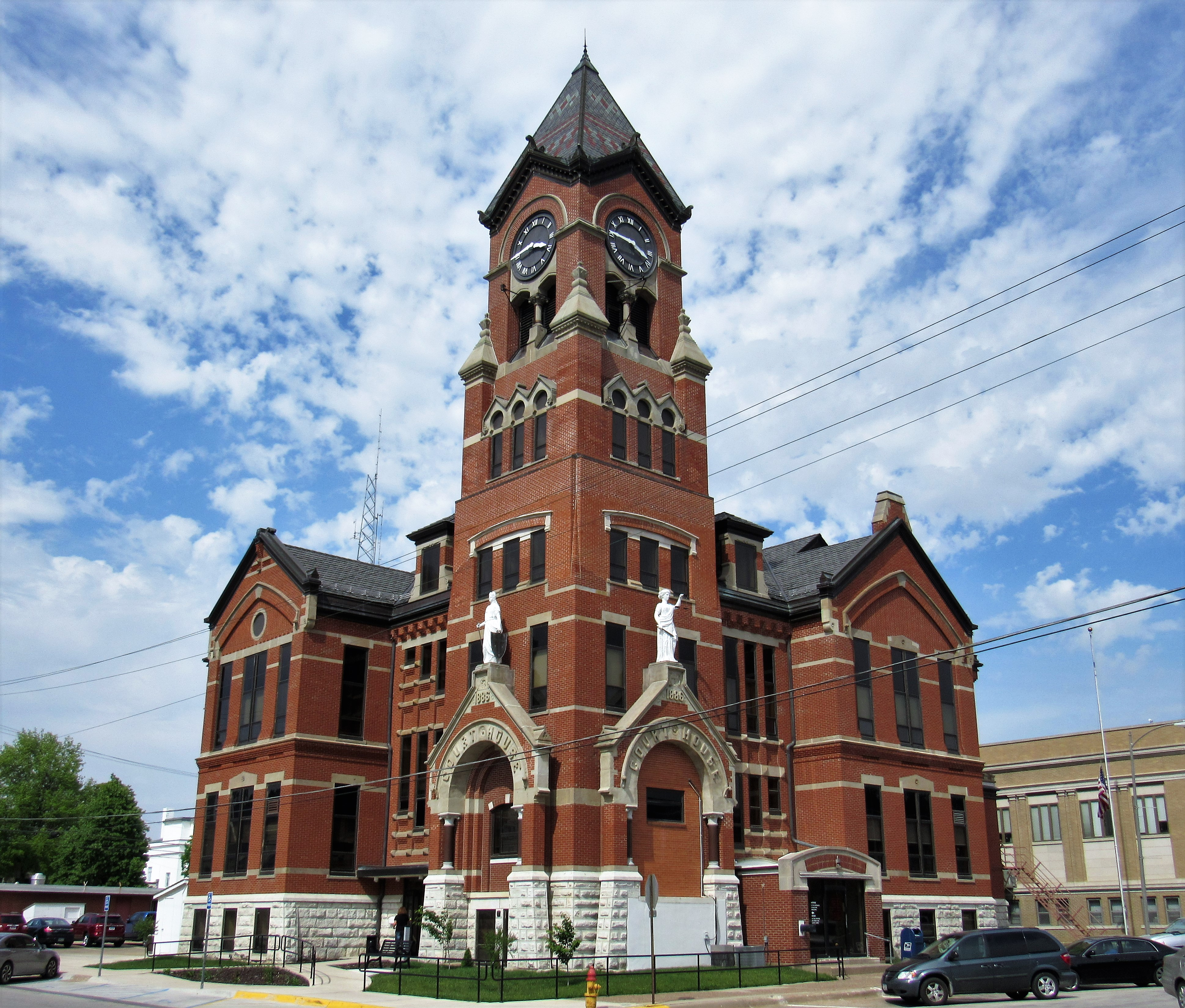
The Washington County Courthouse in Washington, designed by Foster & Liebbe in the Richardsonian Romanesque style and completed in 1887

William Foster (July 21, 1842 – December 30, 1909) was an American architect. Foster practiced architecture in Des Moines, Iowa, from 1867 until 1899. Alone and with partners he was responsible for the design of numerous courthouses and other public buildings throughout the state. In 1878 he began a second career in theatre management, which continued until his death.

== Early life and architectural career ==
William Foster was born July 21, 1842, in Little Neck, New York, now incorporated into Queens. He was trained as a carpenter, worked as a contractor and operated a planing mill in Flushing. By his own telling he was trained in architecture in the office of Richard Upjohn and in 1867 moved west and settled in Des Moines.

Foster's early works include two office buildings in downtown Des Moines: the Hawkeye Insurance Company Building (1869, NRHP-listed) and the Youngerman Block (1876, NRHP-listed). Contemporaneously with these works, his plans for the Anamosa State Penitentiary (1881 et seq., NRHP-listed) were accepted in 1872. This sprawling Gothic Revival complex was completed in phases over the remainder of Foster's career. The administration building, the focal point of the penitentiary, was not completed until 1899. While this project was underway he also designed the Nebraska State Penitentiary. Other works from the first phase of his career include the former Story County Courthouse (1877, demolished) in Nevada and the Blair House (1881, NRHP-listed) in Washington.

By January 1883 Foster had formed the partnership of Foster & Liebbe with Henry F. Liebbe, his chief draftsman since at least 1878. Their major work in Des Moines, the Cathedral Church of St. Paul (1885, NRHP-listed), is one of the latest buildings by Foster remaining in the city. They were also responsible for at least seven county courthouses: for Emmet County (1884, demolished), Page County (1887, NRHP-listed), Washington County (1887, NRHP-listed), Iowa County (1893, NRHP-listed), Lucas County (1894, NRHP-listed) and Wapello County (1894, NRHP-listed). Architectural historian David Gebhard described their Washington County Courthouse as perhaps the "most exuberant" example of Richardsonian Romanesque architecture in Iowa. They also designed at least one major state institution, the Clarinda Treatment Complex (1886).

In 1896 a third partner, Oliver A. Smith, was admitted and the firm was renamed Foster, Liebbe & Smith. Smith withdrew in 1897 and the firm continued as Foster, Liebbe & Company. In 1899 Foster retired from practice and the firm continued under Liebbe's leadership as Liebbe, Nourse & Rasmussen.

== Theatre management career ==
Over twenty years earlier, Foster had designed and built the Academy of Music (1878, demolished 1911), soon renamed Foster's Opera House. In 1891 he also took over management of the Grand Opera House, and acquired it outright in 1894. By owning these theatres, Foster dominated the theatrical life of Des Moines. Shortly after his retirement from practice he embarked on a remodeling of both theatres. In June 1909 Foster announced plans to retire as soon as his contract with the lessee of his theatres expired in 1911; he anticipated that Foster's would be demolished for an office building.

== Personal life and death ==
Foster was married in 1868 to Louisa Corbin. After her death he remarried in 1886 to Louise A. Harris; they had three children, all daughters.

Foster died December 30, 1909, at the age of 67. Early that morning he had woken up to light a gas heater before going back to bed until the room was warm, typical of his winter habits. However the heater had failed to light and filled the room with gas, asphyxiating him and a house guest who had been sharing the room. The guest, a boy described as the "sweetheart" of Foster's youngest daughter, was apparently still alive when found but was not able to be resuscitated.

== Architectural works ==
A number of his works are listed on the United States National Register of Historic Places.

Other works include (with attribution):

- E.R. Hays House, 301 N. 2nd St., Knoxville, Iowa (Foster, William), NRHP-listed
- Naylor House, 944 W. 9th St., Des Moines, Iowa (Foster, William), NRHP-listed
- Parker's Opera House, 23 N. Federal Ave., Mason City, Iowa (Foster, William), NRHP-listed
- English Office Building for Iowa State College, Ames, Iowa
- Central School, Lake City, Iowa (Foster & Liebee), NRHP-listed
- Central Christian Church, Des Moines, Iowa (Foster & Liebbe)
- Herndon Hall, 2000 Grand Ave., Des Moines, Iowa (Foster & Liebbe), NRHP-listed
- One or more buildings in the Grinnell Historic Commercial District, Grinnell, Iowa (Foster & Liebbe), NRHP-listed
- One or more works in the Winterset Courthouse Square Commercial Historic District, Winterset, Iowa (William Foster), NRHP-listed

== See also ==
- William Dewey Foster, architect of post offices and government buildings
