= Iowa County Courthouse (Iowa) =

- U.S. National Register of Historic Places
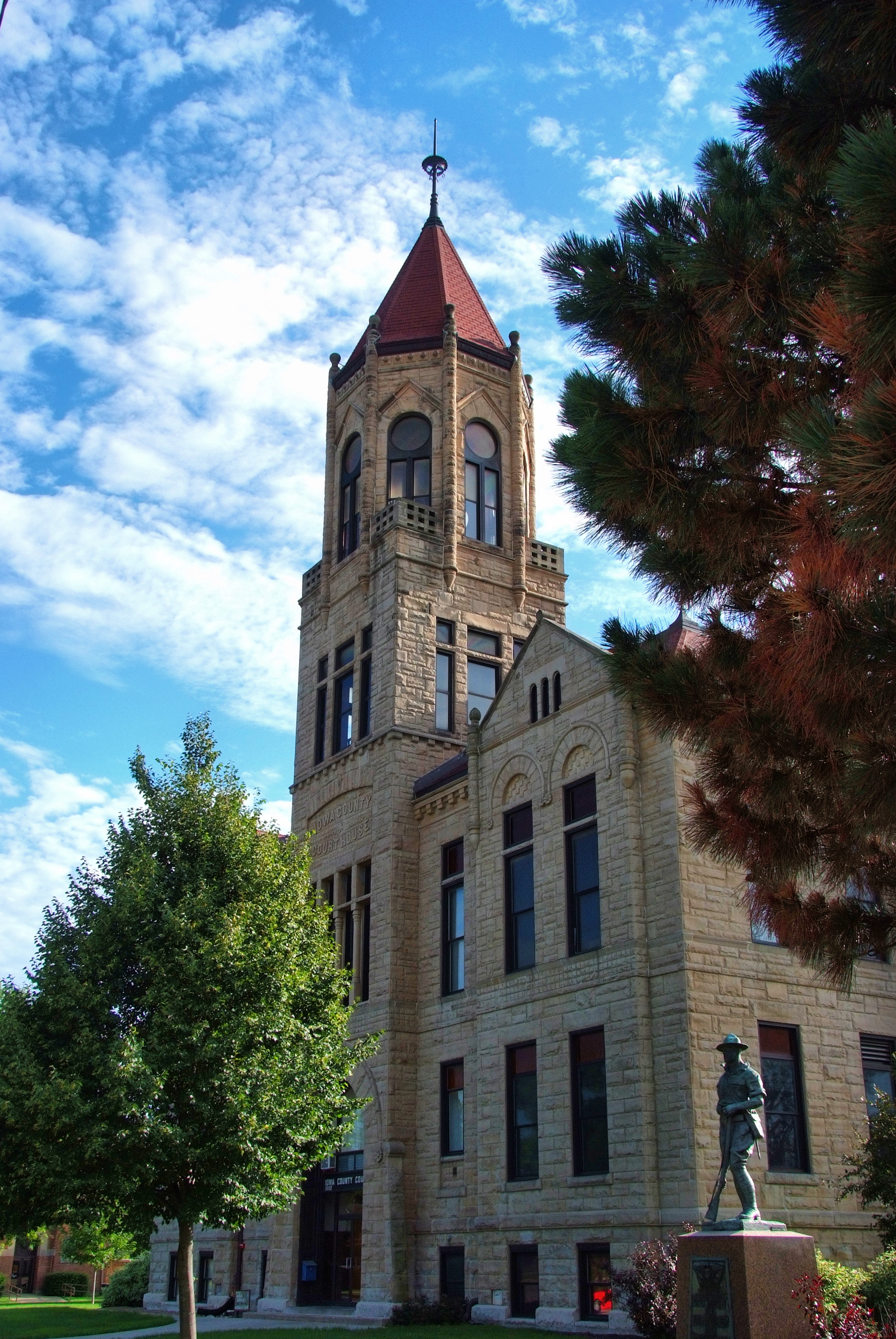

- Location within Iowa Location within the United States
- Interactive map showing the location for Iowa County Courthouse
- Location: Court Ave. Marengo, Iowa
- Coordinates: 41°47′53″N 92°4′14″W
- Area: less than one acre
- Built: 1893
- Architect: Foster & Liebbe
- Architectural style: Romanesque Revival
- MPS: County Courthouses in Iowa TR
- NRHP reference No.: 81000247
- Added to NRHP: July 2, 1981

The Iowa County Courthouse in Marengo, Iowa, United States, was built in 1893. It was listed on the National Register of Historic Places in 1981 as a part of the County Courthouses in Iowa Thematic Resource. The courthouse is the fourth building the county has used for court functions and county administration.

== History ==
Iowa County’s first courthouse was a one-room building constructed in 1847. The county board of supervisors decided the building was not sufficient and they had another building built and it was completed in 1851. It became too small within ten years and a third courthouse was built for $2,000. The present Richardsonian influenced Romanesque Revival building was built for $57,608.16. The county raised $50,000 for construction by auctioning off swampland, which it owned in Ida and Cherokee counties. The building is constructed of Berea Sandstone and features a 137-foot (42 m) tower. It is capped with an octagonal top stage and a high, pointed roof. This type of treatment is not found in any other courthouse in Iowa. The Iowa County Courthouse was dedicated on December 20, 1893.
