= Iowa State Capitol =

State capitol building of the U.S. state of Iowa

- U.S. National Register of Historic Places
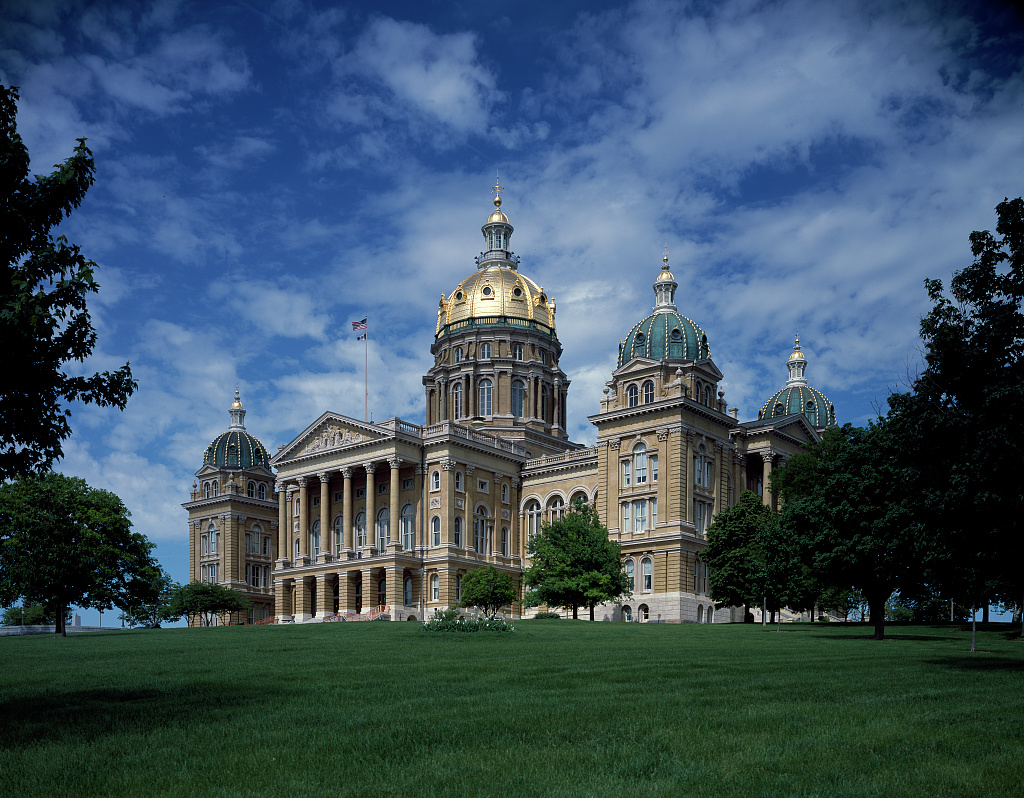
- State Capitol

- Location within Iowa Location within the United States
- Interactive map of Iowa State Capitol
- Location: Grand Ave. and E. 12th St. Des Moines, Iowa
- Coordinates: 41°35′28.3″N 93°36′13.7″W
- Area: 17 acres (6.9 ha)
- Built: 1871–1886
- Architects: John C. Cochrane; Alfred H. Piquenard
- Architectural style: Renaissance Revival
- MPS: State Capitol TR (AD)
- NRHP reference No.: 76000799
- Added to NRHP: October 21, 1976

The Iowa State Capitol, commonly called the Iowa Statehouse, is in Iowa's capital city, Des Moines. As the seat of the Iowa General Assembly, the building houses the Iowa Senate, Iowa House of Representatives, the Office of the Governor, and the Offices of the Attorney General, Auditor, Treasurer, and Secretary of State. The building also includes a chamber for the Iowa Supreme Court, although court activities usually take place in the neighboring Iowa Supreme Court building. The building was constructed between 1871 and 1886, and is the only five-domed capitol in the country.

Located at East 9th Street and Grand Avenue, the Capitol is set atop a hill and offers a panoramic view of the city's downtown and the West Capitol Terrace. Various monuments and memorials are to its sides and front, including the Soldiers’ and Sailors’ Civil War Monument and the Lincoln and Tad statue.

== History ==
=== Construction ===
Not long after achieving statehood, Iowa recognized that the Capitol should be moved farther west than Iowa City, and the 1st General Assembly, in 1846, authorized a commission to select a location. In 1847, the town of Monroe City, in Jasper County, was selected as the new location of the capitol and platted out, but the 1848 Legislature decided not to move the capitol from Iowa City. In 1854, the General Assembly decreed a location “within two miles of the Raccoon fork of the Des Moines River.” The exact spot was chosen when Wilson Alexander Scott gave the state nine and one-half acres where the Capitol now stands. Final legislative approval for the construction of a permanent statehouse was given on April 8, 1870.

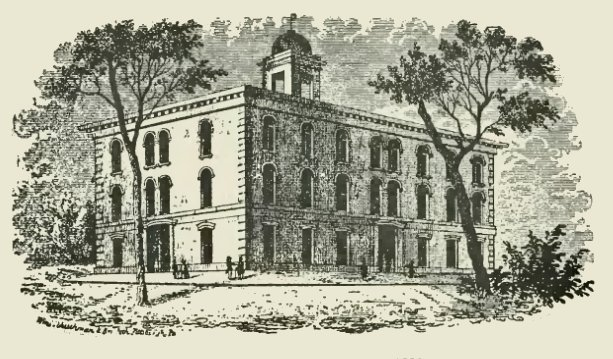
Old Capitol in Des Moines

A three-story brick building served as a temporary Capitol and was in use for 30 years, until destroyed by fires: in the meantime, the permanent Capitol was being planned and built.

In 1870, the General Assembly established a Capitol commission including local businessman and politician Peter A. Dey to employ an architect, choose a plan for a building (not to cost more than $1.5 million), and proceed with the work, but only by using funds available without increasing the tax rate.

John C. Cochrane and Alfred H. Piquenard were designated as architects, and a cornerstone was laid on November 23, 1871. However, much of the original stone deteriorated through waterlogging and severe weather, and had to be replaced. The cornerstone was relaid on September 29, 1873.

Although the building could not be constructed for $1.5 million as planned, the Cochrane and Piquenard design was retained, and modifications were undertaken. Cochrane resigned in 1872, but Piquenard continued until his death in 1876. He was succeeded by two of his assistants, Mifflin E. Bell and W.F. Hackney. Bell redesigned the dome so that it better fit the proportions of the building. Hackney was the only architect who stayed on the project until the end.

The capitol building was dedicated on January 17, 1884, and it was completed sometime in 1886. The building commission made its final report on June 29, 1886, with a total cost of $2,873,294.59. The audit showed that only $3.77 was unaccounted for in the 15 years of construction.

=== Fire and restoration ===
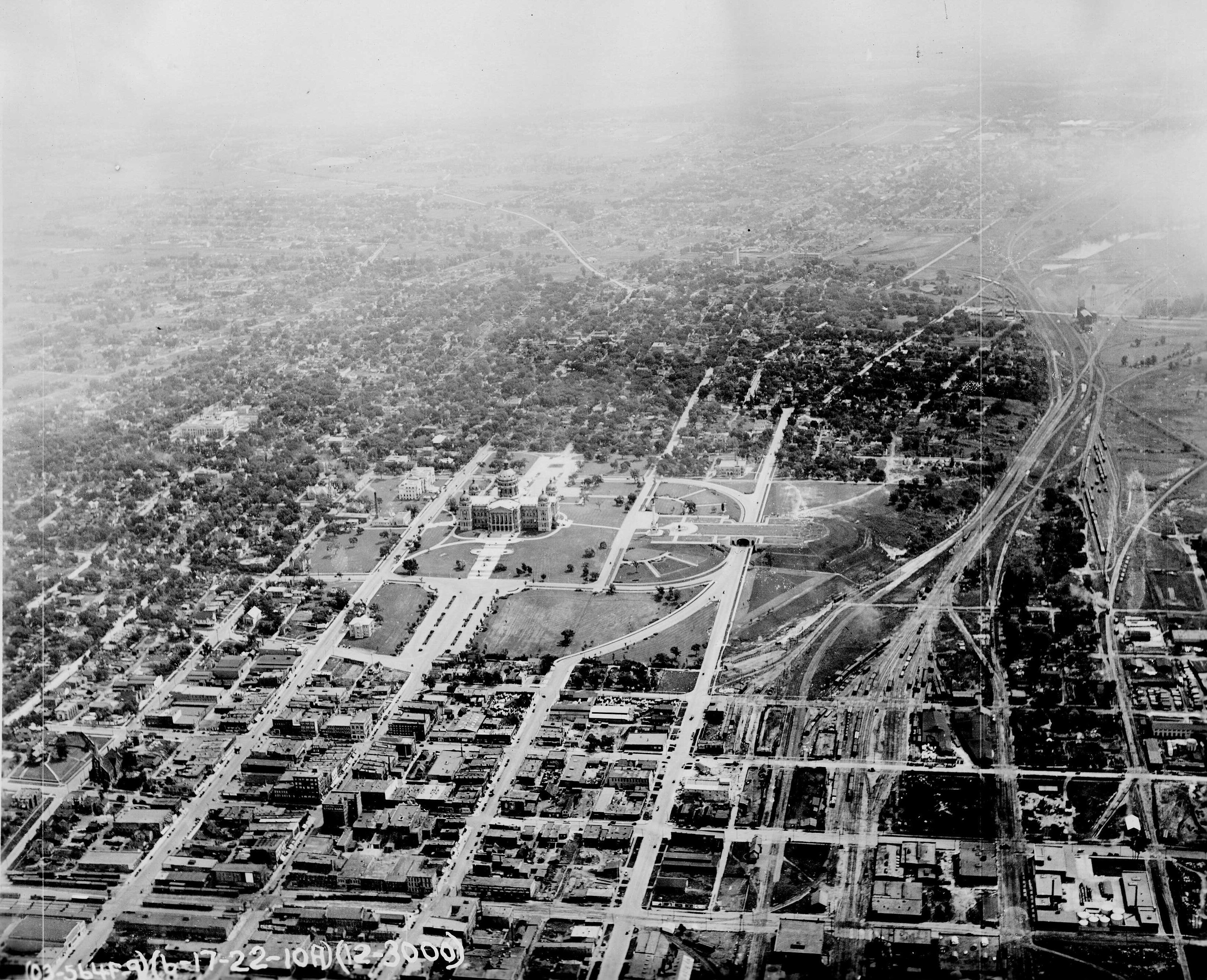
Iowa State Capitol in the 1930s

On January 4, 1904, a fire was started when the gas lights were being converted into electricity. The fire swept through the areas that housed the Supreme Court and Iowa House of Representatives. A major restoration was performed and documented, with the addition of electrical lighting, elevators, and a telephone system. Little information is available about who performed the actual restoration during these early years. However, Elmer Garnsey created the ceiling artwork in the House Chamber.

These earlier efforts to preserve the Capitol mostly dealt with maintaining and upgrading its interior. It was not until 1965, when the dome was regilded, that legislators made significant investments in preserving the building's exterior.

By the early 1980s, the exterior of the Capitol had noticeably deteriorated. Sandstone pieces had begun falling from the building, prompting the installation of steel canopies at all entrances of the building to protect pedestrians. Decorative stone, whose deterioration had first been documented as early as the start of the 20th century, had also eroded.

Work on the exterior restoration began in the spring of 1983 and was completed in nine phases. Phase 9 work began in the spring of 1998, and the entire project was completed in the fall of 2001, at a cost of $41 million.

=== Recurring Events ===
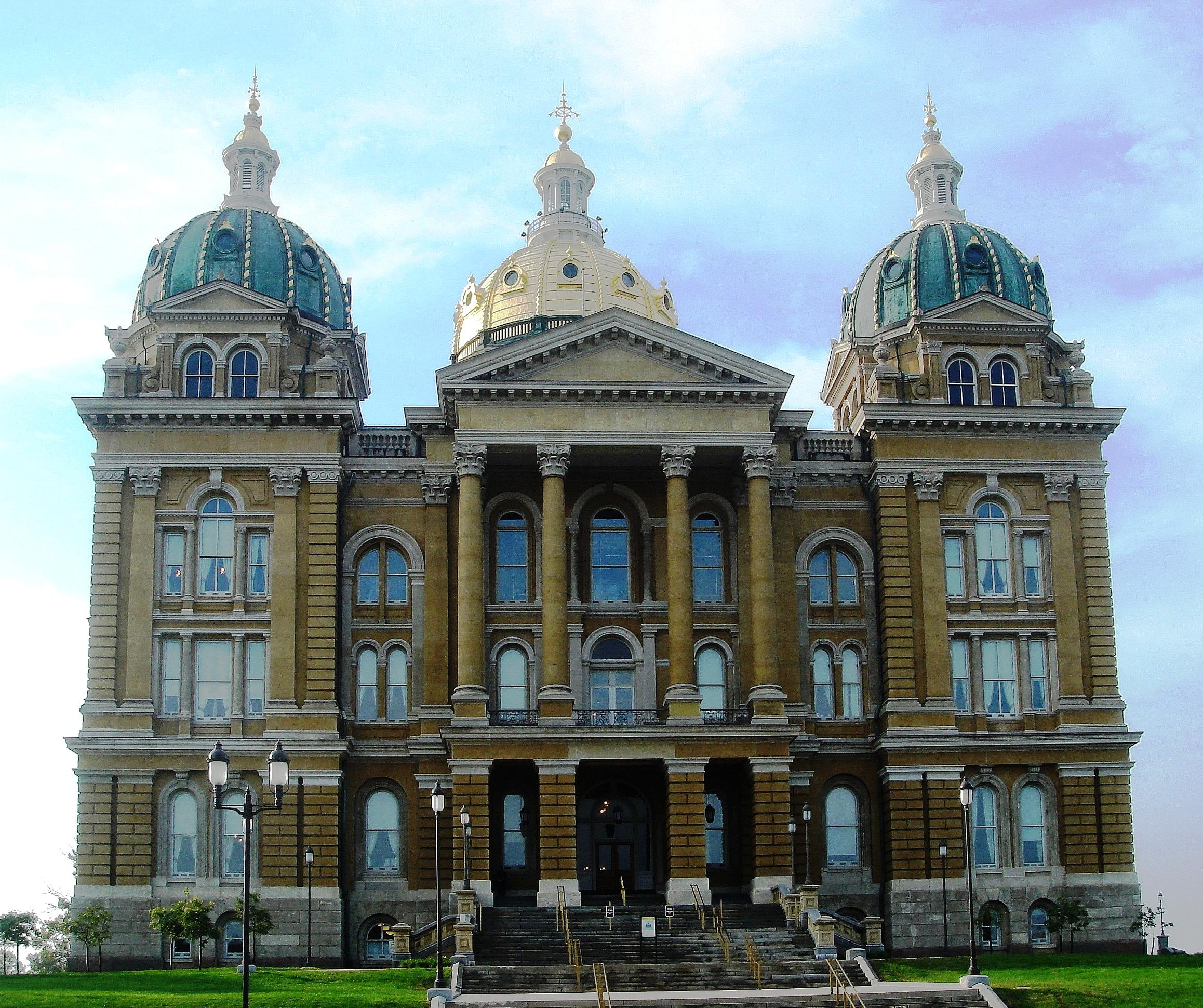
North side view of Capitol building

Since 1987, the World Food Prize laureate award ceremony is held annually in October in the House of Representatives chamber of the statehouse. Following the ceremony, the celebration continues at a laureate award dinner held in the Capitol rotunda.

== Architecture ==
The architectural design of the Capitol, rectangular in form, with great windows and high ceilings, follows the traditional pattern of 19th-century planning for public buildings. A modified and refined Renaissance style gives the impression of strength and dignity combined with utility. The building measures 364 ft (111 m) from north to south and 247 ft (75 m) from east to west.

== Exterior ==
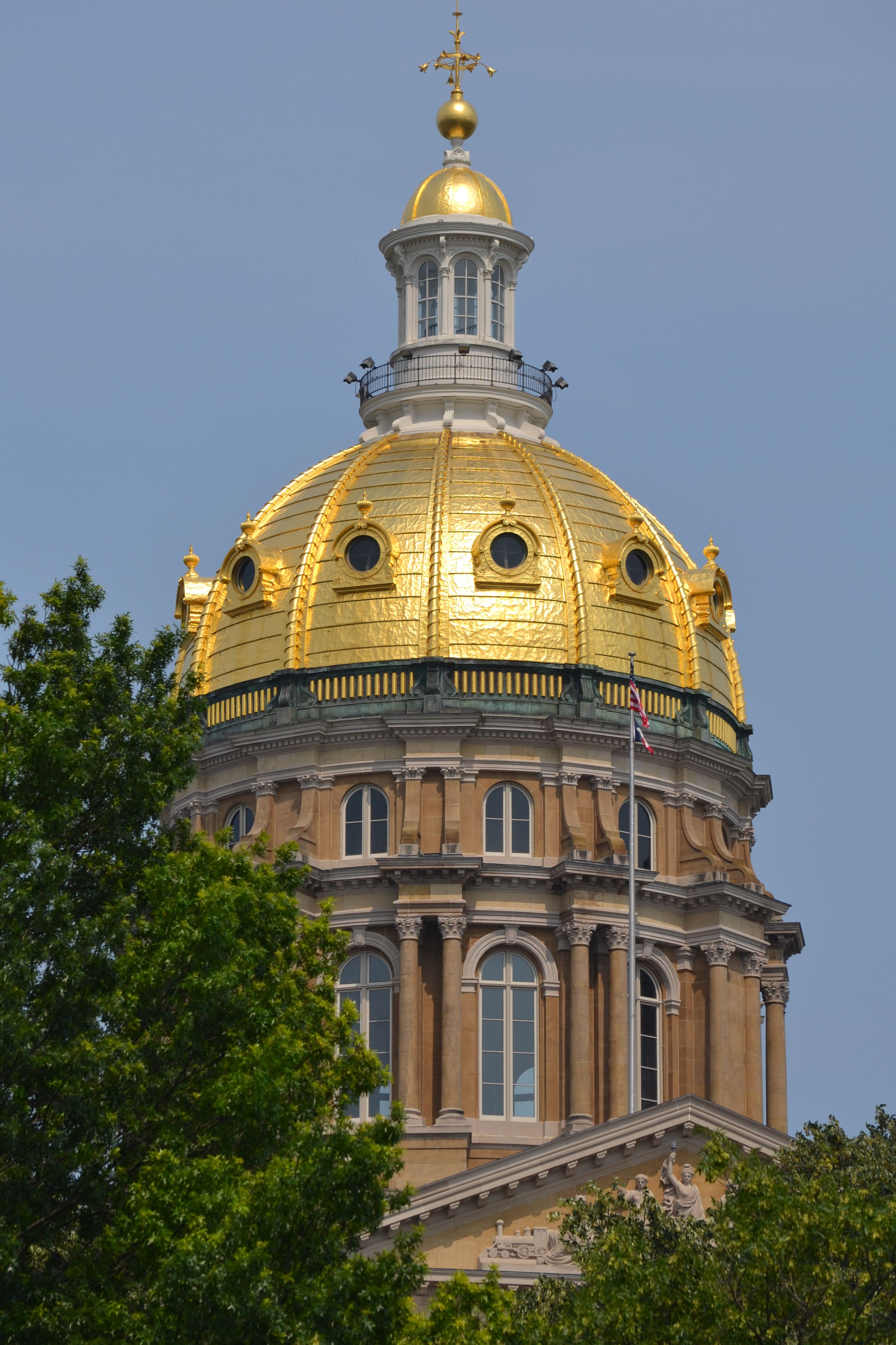
The central dome.

The exterior of the building is entirely of stone with elaborate columns and handsomely designed cornices and capitals. Iowa stone is the foundation for the many porticoes of the building. The building is brick with limestone from Iowa, Missouri, Minnesota, Ohio, and Illinois. The substructure is of dark Iowa stone topped by a heavy course of wari-colored granite cut from glacial boulders gathered from the Iowa prairie. The superstructure, or main part of the building, is of bluff colored sandstone from quarries along the Mississippi River in Missouri.

Both front and back porticoes have pediments supported by six Corinthian columns each. The pediment over the front entrance discloses a fine piece of allegorical sculpture.

The commanding feature is the central towering dome constructed of iron and brick and covered with tissue-paper thin sheets of pure 23-carat gold. There is a protective layer sealing the gold from the weather. The gold leafing was replaced in 1964–1965 at a cost of $79,938. The most recent regilding of the dome was carried out from 1998 to 1999, at a cost of about $482,000. The dome is surmounted by a lookout lantern that may be reached by long and winding stairs, and it terminates in a finial that is 275 ft (84 m) above the ground floor. From its opening during 1884 until 1924, it was the tallest building in Des Moines, and likely the entire state. The rotunda beneath the dome is 80 ft (24 m) in diameter. Four smaller domes of simple design rise from the four corners of the Capitol.

== Interior ==
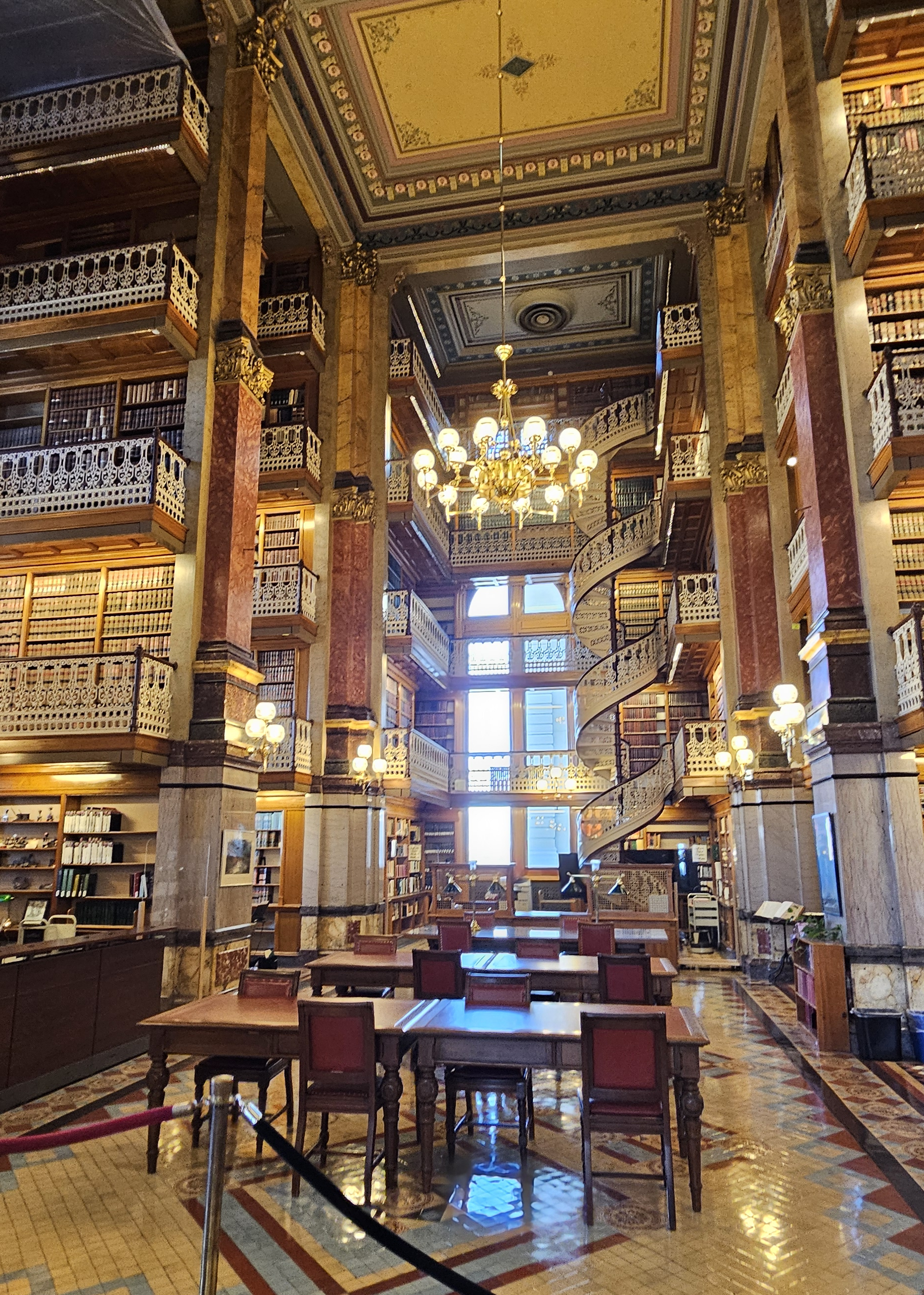
The Law Library

The walls of the Capitol are highly decorated and the rooms and chambers of the capitol have a wide variety of Iowa wood as well as imported marble. Broad, lofty corridors extend west, north, and south. Twenty-nine types of imported and domestic marble were used in the interior; and the wood used—walnut, cherry, catalpa, butternut, and oak—was nearly all from Iowa forests.

The marble grand staircase between the second and third floors is to the east and is the focal point of the building. Suites opening from the south corridor are those of the Governor, Auditor of State, and Treasurer of State. The historical Supreme Court Chamber is to the north; the Secretary of State's suite is to the west. The grand staircase ascends to a landing and divides north and south to bring visitors to the floor above, where the House of Representatives is on the north, the Senate is on the south side, and the Law Library on the west. The Victorian-styled Law Library features four stories of balcony shelves surrounding a central atrium and is open to the public on weekdays.

The ground floor houses a cafeteria and administrative offices.

=== Art ===
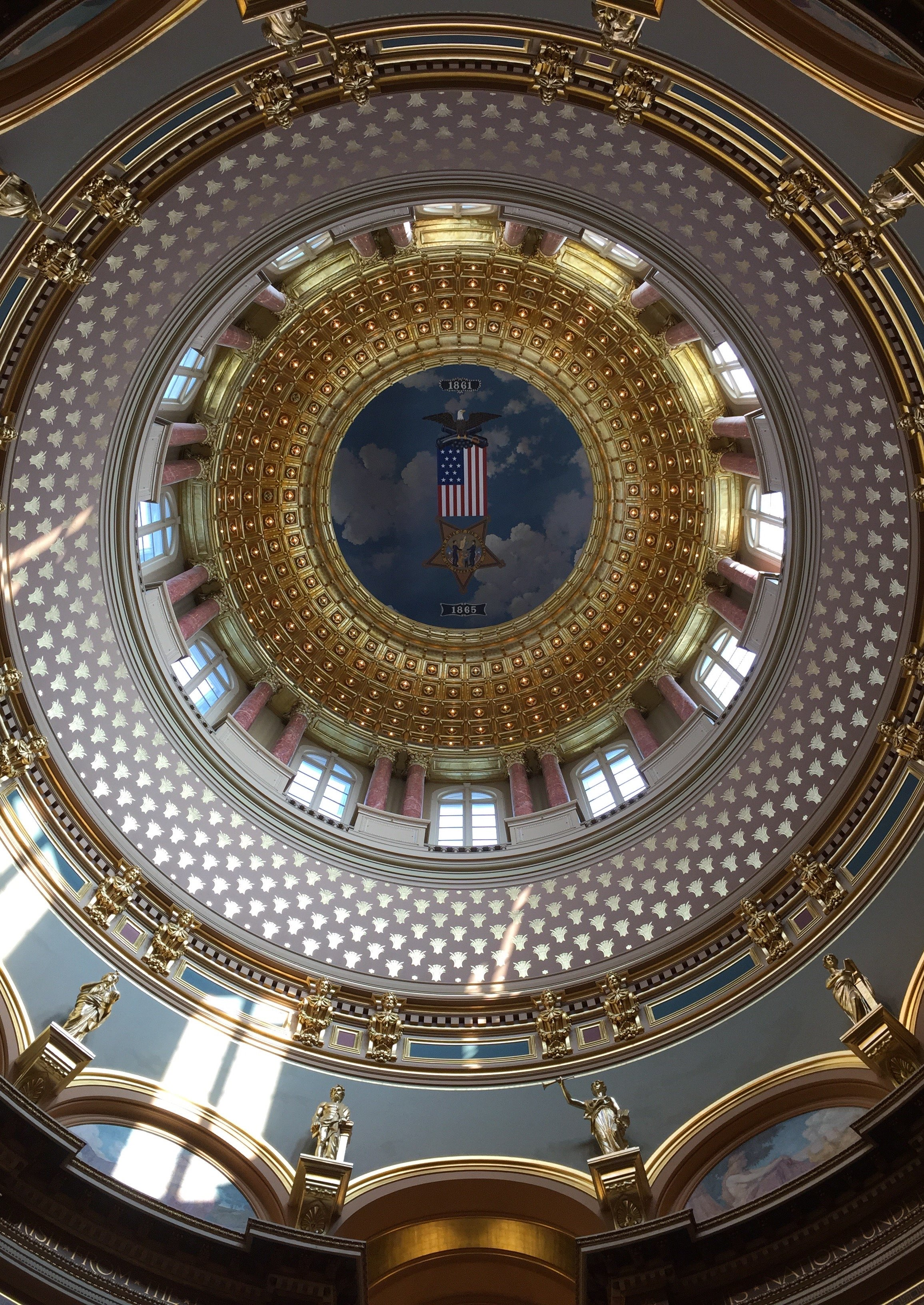
Iowa State Capitol dome as viewed inside from rotunda

Around the rotunda on the frieze above the columns is the famous quotation from Abraham Lincoln's Gettysburg Address: "This nation under God shall have a new birth of freedom that government of the people, by the people, for the people, shall not perish from the earth."

Extending the full width of the east wall over the staircase is the great mural painting Westward, an idealized representation of the coming of the people who made Iowa. The painting was completed shortly after the start of the 20th century. Edwin H. Blashfield, the artist, wrote of it: "The main idea of the picture is a symbolical presentation of the Pioneers led by the spirits of Civilization and Enlightenment to the conquest by cultivation of the Great West."

In the central rotunda, suspended beneath the ceiling on wires is a very large banner of the insignia of the Grand Army of the Republic, which between 1894 and 1953 had a room in the state capitol dedicated for their use. They are the only non-state agency to have ever occupied space in the capitol.

=== Displays ===
The battle flags carried by the Iowa regiments in various wars are preserved in niches on the main floor: Civil War, 1; Spanish–American War, 13; World War I, 26. In the west hall is a plaque done by Nellie V. Walker in commemoration of the work of Iowa women in the fight for political equality and a memorial to those Iowans killed in Operation Iraqi Freedom and Operation Enduring Freedom.

Also in the west hall is a model of the battleship USS Iowa on loan from the U.S. Department of the Navy. The model is 18 feet 7 inches (5.66 m) long and weighs about 1,350 pounds (610 kg). It is a perfect 1:48 scale model, with 1/4 inch equaling 1 foot. The Iowa was the lead ship of her class of battleship and the fourth in the United States Navy to be named in honor of the 29th state. It is also the last lead ship of any class of United States battleships, and was the only ship of her class to have served in the Atlantic Ocean during World War II. On July 7, 2012, the retired Iowa opened to the public as a floating educational and naval museum at the Port of Los Angeles in San Pedro, California.

In the south hall across from the Governor's office is a collection of porcelain dolls representing the 41 Iowa First Ladies in miniature replicas of their inaugural gowns. Where actual descriptions of the gowns could not be found, they are typical of the period. As future First Ladies take their place, they, too, will be represented.

A two-week display of Baphomet and the seven tenets of the Satanic Temple was set up, with official approval, in the Iowa Capitol in December 2023. This drew criticism from Republican politicians. After the display was ruined, Michael Cassidy, a failed Republican candidate for the Mississippi House of Representatives, was charged with criminal mischief for allegedly vandalizing the display. In a Fox News interview held a few days after he beheaded the statue, Cassidy defended his actions as "Christian civil disobedience", stating: "It offended me. It touched a nerve. It was, you know, righteous indignation." On May 24, 2024, Cassidy pleaded guilty to an aggravated misdemeanor count of third-degree criminal mischief, having previously faced a felony hate crime charge.

== See also ==
- List of state and territorial capitols in the United States
- Iowa Old Capitol Building
- National Register of Historic Places listings in Polk County, Iowa
