= Alfred H. Piquenard =

American architect

Alfred H. Piquenard (1826-1876) was an American architect. Born in France, he studied at Paris' Ecole Centrale des Arts et Manufactures before emigrating to the United States as part of the Icarian movement. After leaving the Icarians, he began work as an architect. He apprenticed with George I. Barnett in St. Louis and then later partnered with John C. Cochrane in Chicago to design the Illinois State Capitol and Iowa State Capitol.

He is buried at Oak Ridge Cemetery in Springfield, IL. https://vimeo.com/crowdson/review/1018463914/a3f4989767
