= National Register of Historic Places listings in Washington County, Iowa =

Location of Washington County in Iowa

This is a list of the National Register of Historic Places listings in Washington County, Iowa.

This is intended to be a complete list of the properties and districts on the National Register of Historic Places in Washington County, Iowa, United States. Latitude and longitude coordinates are provided for many National Register properties and districts; these locations may be seen together in a map.

There are 19 properties and districts listed on the National Register in the county. Another 3 properties were once listed but have been removed.

This National Park Service list is complete through NPS recent listings posted April 24, 2026.

== Current listings ==
| | Name on the Register | Image | Date listed | Location | City or town | Description |
|---|---|---|---|---|---|---|
| 1 | H.A. Baxter Coal Company Historic District | H.A. Baxter Coal Company Historic District | June 15, 2015 (#15000343) | 601 E. 3rd St. 41°18′04″N 91°41′08″W | Washington | |
| 2 | Blair House | Blair House | June 4, 1973 (#73000741) | E. Washington St. and S. 2nd Ave. 41°17′53″N 91°41′23″W | Washington | |
| 3 | Smith Wildman and Jennie (Hearne) Brookhart House | Smith Wildman and Jennie (Hearne) Brookhart House | August 22, 2005 (#05000905) | 1203 E. Washington St. 41°18′00″N 91°40′41″W | Washington | |
| 4 | CM and StP Railroad Underpass | CM and StP Railroad Underpass | May 15, 1998 (#98000469) | County Road G38 over the Soo Railroad line 41°17′36″N 91°43′28″W | Washington | |
| 5 | Jonathan Clark Conger House | Jonathan Clark Conger House | June 28, 1974 (#74000815) | 903 E. Washington St. 41°17′53″N 91°40′54″W | Washington | |
| 6 | County Line Bridge | County Line Bridge | May 15, 1998 (#98000513) | 140th block of County Line Rd. over Long Creek; 41°16′01″N 91°29′07″W | Columbus Junction | Extends into Louisa County |
| 7 | Gracehill Moravian Church and Cemetery | Gracehill Moravian Church and Cemetery | August 12, 1977 (#77000563) | Southwest of Washington on Iowa Highway 314; 41°15′47″N 91°49′47″W | Washington | |
| 8 | Joseph Keck House | Joseph Keck House | November 28, 1978 (#78001268) | 504 W. Washington St. 41°17′56″N 91°41′48″W | Washington | |
| 9 | Kurtz House | Kurtz House | September 22, 1977 (#77000564) | 305 S. Ave., C 41°17′50″N 91°41′44″W | Washington | |
| 10 | McCleery Calendar Factory | McCleery Calendar Factory | June 16, 2015 (#15000344) | 632 E. 3rd St. 41°18′05″N 91°41′06″W | Washington | |
| 11 | Pilotburg Church | Pilotburg Church | May 2, 1996 (#96000517) | 1874 155th St. 41°26′04″N 91°46′36″W | Wellman | |
| 12 | St. Mary's Parish Church Buildings | St. Mary's Parish Church Buildings | July 9, 1979 (#79000946) | St. Mary's and Washburn Sts. 41°29′00″N 91°34′54″W | Riverside | |
| 13 | Winfield Smouse House | Winfield Smouse House | January 27, 1983 (#83000409) | 321 S. Iowa Ave. 41°17′43″N 91°34′21″W | Washington | |
| 14 | Frank Stewart House | Frank Stewart House | November 16, 1987 (#87002021) | 603 W. Washington St. 41°17′54″N 91°41′51″W | Washington | |
| 15 | Washington County Courthouse | Washington County Courthouse | July 2, 1981 (#81000273) | N. B Ave. 41°11′17″N 91°45′06″W | Washington | |
| 16 | Washington Downtown Historic District | Washington Downtown Historic District | May 22, 2013 (#13000297) | 11 blocks of Iowa & Marion Aves., Washington, Main & 2nd Sts. 41°17′58″N 91°41′33″W | Washington | |
| 17 | West Side Residential Historic District | | September 14, 2018 (#100002919) | Roughly the 300-800 blocks of W Washington Blvd., W Jefferson & W Main Sts. including Sunset Park; 41°17′55″N 91°41′48″W | Washington | |
| 18 | Woodlawn Cemetery Gates and Shelter | Woodlawn Cemetery Gates and Shelter | October 4, 2016 (#16000688) | 501 W. Adams; 41°17′40″N 91°41′49″W | Washington | |
| 19 | Alexander Young Cabin | Alexander Young Cabin | August 14, 1973 (#73000742) | W. Madison St. between G and H Aves. 41°17′50″N 91°42′07″W | Washington | |

== Former listings ==
| | Name on the Register | Image | Date listed | Date removed | Location | City or town | Description |
|---|---|---|---|---|---|---|---|
| 1 | Thomas Johnson Polygonal Barn | | June 30, 1986 (#86001451) | December 19, 2014 | Off Iowa Highway 114; 41°26′21″N 91°49′44″W | Wellman | |
| 2 | Rubio Bridge | | May 15, 1998 (#98000471) | November 11, 2002 | Over Skunk River | Rubio vicinity | Destroyed by fire on September 3, 2002 |
| 3 | Washington County Hospital | | December 22, 1977 (#77000565) | April 26, 2006 | S. 4th Ave. and Clara Barton | Washington | Demolished in March, 2006. |

== See also ==
- List of National Historic Landmarks in Iowa
- National Register of Historic Places listings in Iowa
- Listings in neighboring counties: Henry, Iowa, Jefferson, Johnson, Keokuk, Louisa
