= West Side Residential Historic District =

Historic district in Iowa, United States

- U.S. National Register of Historic Places
- U.S. Historic district
- Location within Iowa Location within the United States
- Location: Roughly the 300-800 blocks of W Washington Blvd., W Jefferson & W Main Sts. including Sunset Park, Washington, Iowa
- Coordinates: 41°17′54.6″N 91°41′48.5″W
- NRHP reference No.: 100002919
- Added to NRHP: September 14, 2018

The West Side Residential Historic District is a nationally recognized historic district located in Washington, Iowa, United States. It was listed on the National Register of Historic Places in 2018. At the time it was studied for the State of Iowa it contained 255 resources, which included 184 contributing buildings, one contributing site, one contributing structure, one contributing object, and 68 non-contributing buildings. Some of the numbers could be adjusted up for the National Register nomination as the park required further study. The historic district is a residential neighborhood on the west side of town with houses that were built from the 1850s to the 1960s. The oldest house in the district was constructed in 1856, and eight of the houses were built after 1969, the cut-off year for inclusion as a contributing property. All of the houses are single family dwellings, and most of them are frame construction. Nine of the houses are brick or stucco. They range in height from single-story to two-story structures. The district is noteworthy for its large collection of Victorian styles from the 1880s to the 1900s, but there are also a number of American Foursquare, American Craftsman, and bungalows in the neighborhood as well. The Joseph Keck House (c. 1860) and the Frank Stewart House (1894) are individually listed on the National Register of Historic Places.

The contributing site is Sunset Park, which was developed by prominent residents who lived in the neighborhood in the early 20th century. It sits to the west of the residential area. The Alexander Young Cabin (1840) was relocated to the park in 1912, and it is individually listed on the National Register. A marker that commemorates the park's original donor is the contributing object. A section of West Washington Boulevard is paved with brick and it is the contributing structure.
