= Winfield Smouse House =

Historic house in Iowa, United States

- U.S. National Register of Historic Places
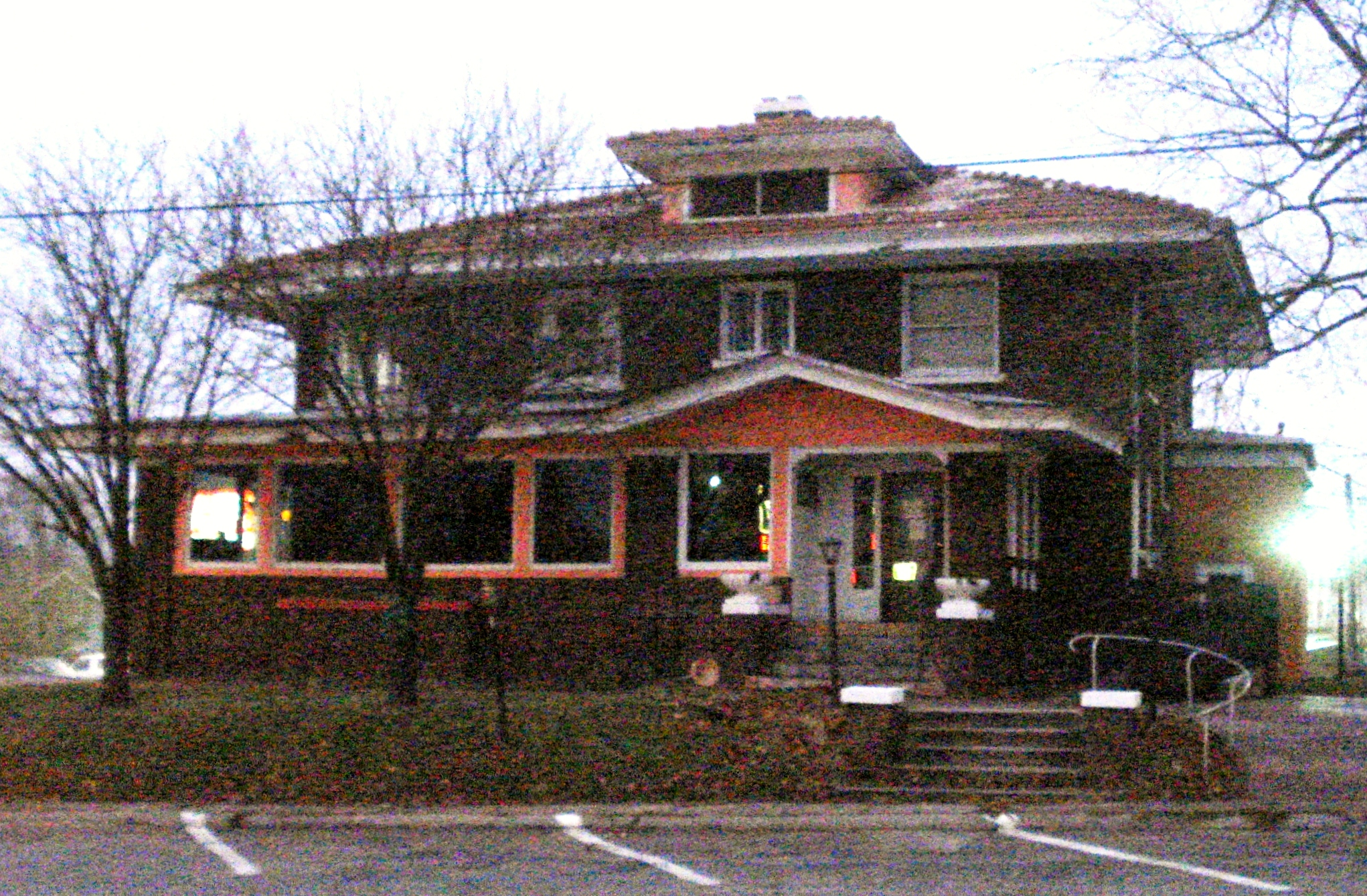

- Location within Iowa Location within the United States
- Location: 321 S. Iowa Ave. Washington, Iowa
- Coordinates: 41°17′47.92″N 91°41′31.56″W
- Area: less than one acre
- Built: 1916
- Architectural style: Prairie School
- NRHP reference No.: 83000409
- Added to NRHP: January 27, 1983

The Winfield Smouse House, is a historic structure located in Washington, Iowa, United States. It was listed on the National Register of Historic Places in 1983. Winfield Smouse arrived in Washington in 1867. He was initially involved in retail grocery and hardware. He invested in real estate and he ended up platting and developing five major additions to the city. By the time he died he was considered the wealthiest person in town. The two-story brick houses is a local adaptation of the Prairie School style. The house has subsequently been converted into a restaurant. As of May 2026, it has been replaced with a Scooter's Coffee.
