= Keith Molesworth =

American football player and coach (1905–1966)

No. 4
- Positions: Halfback, quarterback

Personal information
- Born: October 20, 1905; Washington, Iowa, U.S.
- Died: March 12, 1966 (aged 60); Baltimore, Maryland, U.S.
- Listed height: 5 ft 9 in (1.75 m)
- Listed weight: 167 lb (76 kg)

Career information
- High school: Washington
- College: Monmouth (Illinois)

Career history

Playing
- Rock Island Independents (1927); Portsmouth Spartans (1928-1929); Ironton Tanks (1930); Chicago Bears (1931–1937)

Coaching
- Navy (1938–1945) Assistant Backfield Coach; Hawaiian Warriors (1947–1948) Head Coach; Richmond Rebels (1949–1950) Head Coach; Pittsburgh Steelers (1952) Assistant Backfield Coach; Baltimore Colts (1953) Head Coach

Awards and highlights
- As a player: 2× NFL champion (1932, 1933); Second-team All-Pro (1932); As a coach: 2× PCPFL champion

Career statistics
- Passing attempts: 226
- Passing completions: 86
- Completion percentage: 38.1%
- TD–INT: 18–19
- Passing yards: 1,486
- Passer rating: 52.7
- Rushing yards: 1,105
- Rushing touchdowns: 8
- Stats at Pro Football Reference

Head coaching record
- Career: 3–9 (.250)
- Coaching profile at Pro Football Reference

Keith Frank Molesworth (October 20, 1905 – March 12, 1966) was an American football player and coach. He also played and managed in minor league baseball.

== Early life ==
Molesworth was born in Washington, Iowa and graduated from Washington High School. When he was 17 years old, Molesworth stood 5 feet 7 inches (1.70 m) tall and weighed 98 pounds (44 kg). Due to his size, he never started a prep football game. Molesworth started growing during the following year, never growing larger than 5′ 9″ and 167 lb.; however, this spurt started his career in sports.

== College career ==
Molesworth went to Monmouth College in Monmouth, Illinois, where he won three letters each in four varsity sports American football, basketball, baseball and track. He became one of the rare 12-letter performers in the history of the college. He was elected to the Monmouth College Athletic Hall of Fame in 1984. He graduated from Monmouth College in 1928.

== Professional career ==
Molesworth played as a professional for nine years, the last seven in both baseball and football. Four of the baseball seasons were in Minor league baseball. Molesworth started his pro football career at the semipro Rock Island Independents in 1927 for $25 per game, he later played for the independent Portsmouth Spartans but was cut before the 1930 season (the Spartans first in the NFL), after dating the head coach girlfriend. Molesworth would later signed with the independent professional Ironton Tanks, and helped them defeat the Chicago Bears in November 1930 and impressing George Halas in the process. After the Ironton Tanks folded in 1931, he tried out for the Bears and went on to play seven seasons with the team, where he was the T-formation quarterback in a backfield that included Red Grange and Bronko Nagurski. The 1932 and 1933 Bears were National Football League champions. He was elected to the State of Iowa Athletic Hall of Fame in 1990.

== Coaching career ==
Molesworth spent eight years as the backfield coach at the U.S. Naval Academy, then six more as a semipro football coach and one year doubling as a minor-league baseball manager, before becoming backfield coach for the Pittsburgh Steelers in 1952.

He was head coach of the Baltimore Colts in 1953, the first season of that franchise's existence. He remained with the club as a vice president and director of personnel until dying of a heart attack on March 12, 1966, while seeding his lawn, at the age of 60.
