= Mike Hennigan (American football) =

American football player and coach (born 1951)

No. 58, 52
- Position: Linebacker

Personal information
- Born: October 24, 1951 (age 75); Davenport, Iowa, U.S.
- Listed height: 6 ft 2 in (1.88 m)
- Listed weight: 217 lb (98 kg)

Career information
- High school: Washington (Washington, Iowa)
- College: Parsons (IA), Tennessee Tech
- NFL draft: 1973: 4th round, 81st overall pick

Career history

Playing
- Detroit Lions (1973–1975); New York Jets (1976–1978)

Coaching
- East Tennessee State (1980–1981) (linebackers); Western Carolina (1982–1983) (defensive coordinator); Memphis State (1984) (linebackers); Temple (1985) (linebackers); Tennessee Tech (1986–1995) (defensive coordinator); Tennessee Tech (1996–2005) (head coach)

Career NFL statistics
- Interceptions: 3
- INT yards: 76
- Stats at Pro Football Reference

Thomas Michael Hennigan (born October 24, 1951) is an American former professional football player and college coach. He played professionally as a linebacker in the National Football League (NFL) for the Detroit Lions from 1973 to 1975 New York Jets from 1976 to 1978. Hennigan served as the head coach at the Tennessee Technological University from 1996 to 2005, compiling a record of 52–57.

== College career ==
Born in Davenport, Iowa, Hennigan was raised in Washington, Iowa. Following graduation from Washington High School, Hennigan attended and played college football at Parsons College in Fairfield, Iowa until the college discontinued their football program in 1970, whereupon he transferred to Tennessee Tech. While at Tech, he was an all-Conference selection in 1972 when he helped lead the Golden Eagles to the Ohio Valley Conference championship. The next season, as a senior, Hennigan was once again all-conference and a College Football All-America Team honorable mention as he amassed 110 tackles. The team finished the season with a record of 10–1 and an appearance in the Grantland Rice Bowl. Hennigan was selected to play in the All-American Bowl at season's end.

== Professional playing career ==
Drafted by the Detroit Lions early in the fourth round of the 1973 NFL draft, Hennigan played three seasons at linebacker for the Lions. After the 1975 season, in which he played only four games for Detroit, Hennigan joined the New York Jets. He played three more NFL seasons for the Jets before a knee injury ended his playing career.

== Coaching career ==
Hennigan got his coaching start in 1980, working with spring drills at his alma mater before moving on to East Tennessee State for two seasons as linebackers coach. He next served as defensive coordinator at Western Carolina University in 1982 and 1983. After his defense helped Western Carolina reach the NCAA Division I-AA Football Championship title game in 1983, Hennigan departed for one-year stints as linebackers coach at Memphis State University in 1984, and defensive ends at Temple University in 1985. Hennigan returned to Tennessee Tech in 1986, beginning a twenty-year career on the coaching staff. He served as the schools defensive coordinator from 1986 through the 1995 season, after which he was named the head coach for the Golden Eagles. Over the following ten seasons Hennigan's teams compiled an overall record of 52 wins and 57 losses, with their best seasons being 2000 and 2001 when Tennessee Tech won eight games and seven games respectively and each year being ranked in the Division I-AA polls. Citing personal reasons and health concerns, Hennigan resigned as Tennessee Tech head coach in July, 2006. However, a week later he rescinded the resignation, instead taking a medical leave of absence. In November, 2006 Hennigan informed the university that he would not be returning from the medical leave.

== Personal life ==
Mike Hennigan earned a bachelor's degree in Health and Physical Education from Tennessee Tech in 1973. He and wife Leslie are the parents of four children. Hennigan was named to the Tennessee Tech Sports Hall of Fame in 1986. Youngest son Taylor also played his college football for Tennessee Tech.

== Head coaching record ==
Year	Team	Overall	Conference	Standing	Bowl/playoffs	TSN^{#}
Tennessee Tech Golden Eagles (Ohio Valley Conference) (1996–2005)
1996	Tennessee Tech	5–6	4–4	T–4th		
1997	Tennessee Tech	6–5	4–3	T–4th		
1998	Tennessee Tech	4–7	2–5	T–6th		
1999	Tennessee Tech	5–5	4–3	T–3rd		
2000	Tennessee Tech	8–3	5–2	3rd		22
2001	Tennessee Tech	7–3	4–2	3rd		23
2002	Tennessee Tech	5–7	2–4	5th		
2003	Tennessee Tech	2–9	1–7	T–8th		
2004	Tennessee Tech	6–5	3–4	5th		
2005	Tennessee Tech	4–7	3–5	6th		
Tennessee Tech:		52–57	32–39			
Total:		52–57				
