= State Theatre (Washington, Iowa) =

Oldest continually operating movie theater in the world

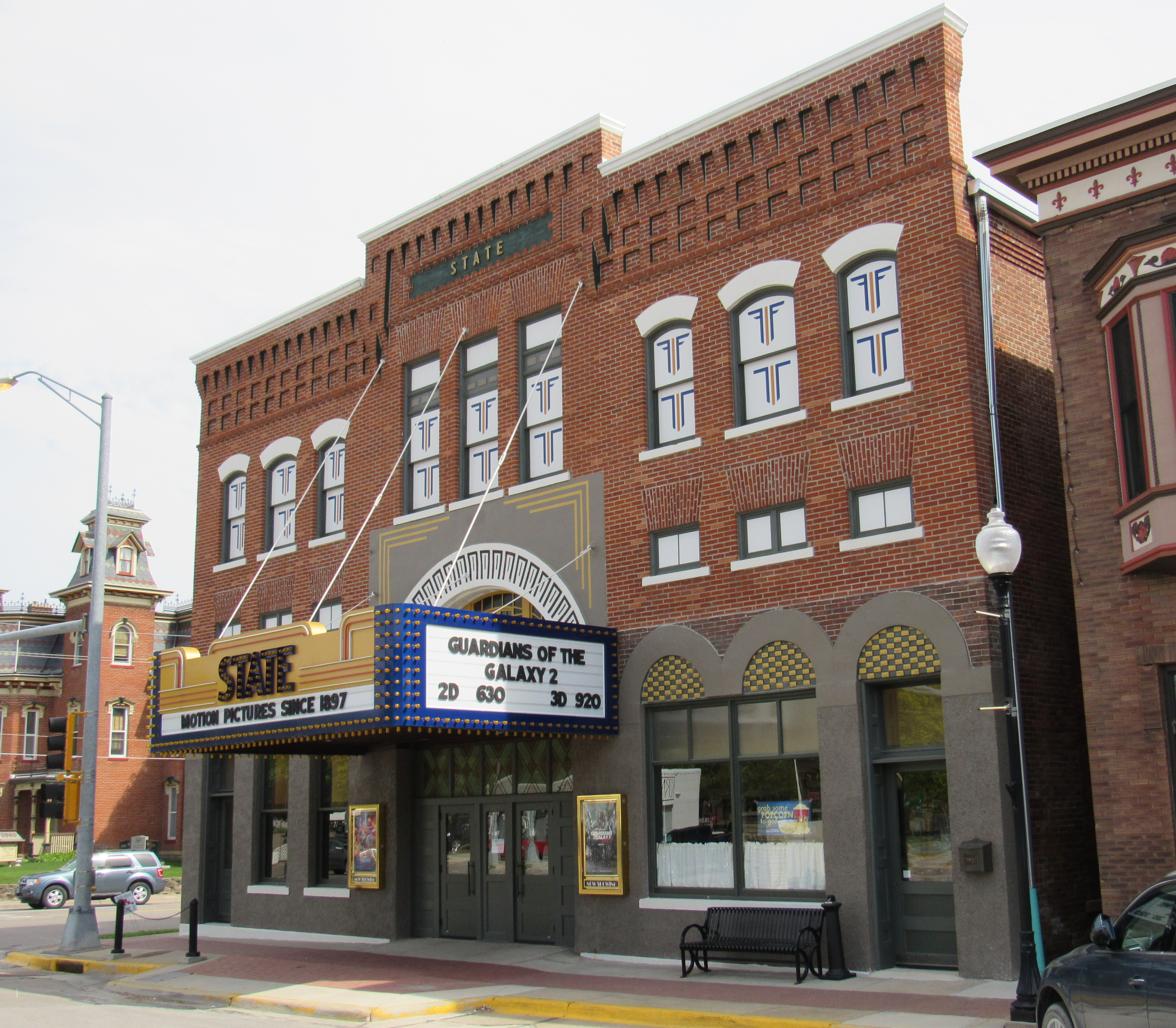
- The State Theatre in 2017
- Interactive map of State Theatre
- Former names: Graham Opera House
- Address: 123 E. Washington Avenue; Washington, Iowa; United States
- Coordinates: 41°17′53″N 91°41′27″W
- Owner: Fridley Theatres
- Screen: 1

Construction
- Built: 1893
- Opened: May 14, 1897; 129 years ago
- Years active: 1897–present

The State Theatre is a historic movie theater in Washington, Iowa. The venue is recognized by Guinness World Records as the oldest continually operating movie theater in the world. It opened in 1893 as the Graham Opera House and screened its first film on May 14, 1897, with a cinematograph made in Paris.

== History ==
The original Graham Opera House existed in Washington, Iowa, and hosted theatre from 1886 until a fire destroyed it on November 23, 1892. Architectural firm Foster & Liebbe drafted the plans for a replacement venue, which was constructed in 1893 at a cost of US$35,000. The second Graham Opera House opened on November 27, 1893. The first production at the venue was Sardou's Odette. Clara Morris visited Washington to star in the production but was ill with influenza. One thousand tickets were sold for $5.00.

On May 14, 1897, the Graham Opera House screened its first movie using a cinematograph from Paris. The venue thereafter became mixed-use, retaining its live theatre programming in addition to movies.

In 1921, the Graham Opera House was purchased by Winfield Smouse, a local businessman. Smouse leased the property to Ralph and Clyde Pratt, who at the time operated an additional theater in the city.

In 1931, the interior of the Graham Opera House was remodeled. In conjunction, the venue was renamed to the State Theatre. Its hosting of professional live theatre companies ceased thereafter; the stage was mostly used by local productions until it was removed to make way for a newer movie screen.

On the morning of November 17, 2010, the State Theatre's projection room caught on fire from a cigarette discarded in a trash can. The venue was subsequently closed for repairs and reopened in April 2011.

In April 2016, Guinness World Records certified the State Theatre as the oldest continuously operating movie theater in the world.

== Note ==
It is very questionable if this is really the oldest cinema in the world as Ptuj City Cinema, the oldest Slovenian movie theater, is continuously operating since 3 March 1897, with first commercial public screening then, is actually making it the oldest still active cinema in the world.
