= Eden Theatre, La Ciotat =

Cinema in La Ciotat, France

Coordinates: 43.1774°N 5.6104°E

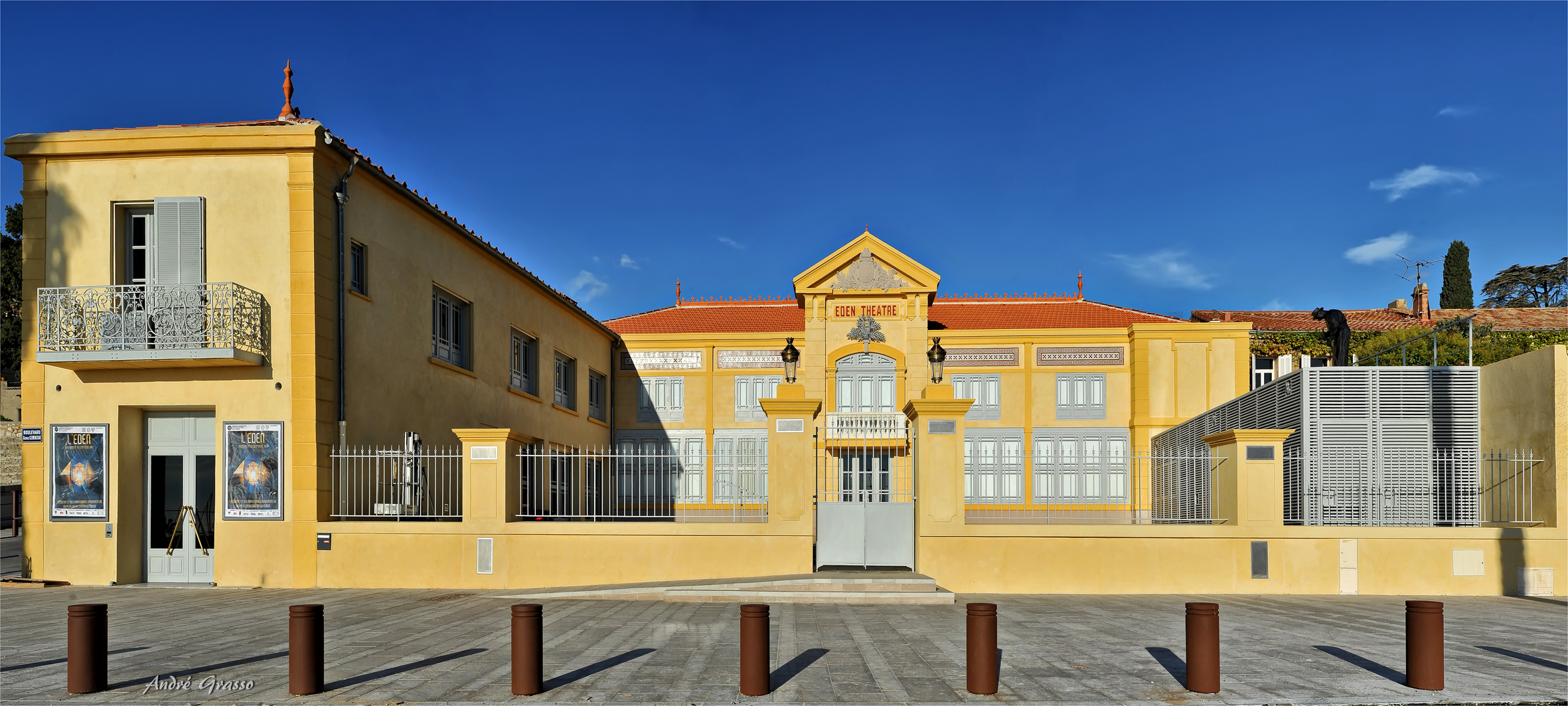
Eden Theatre in 2013

The Eden Theatre in La Ciotat, on the Mediterranean coast of France, between Marseille and Toulon, is regarded as the oldest cinema in the world. The Guinness World Records also considers the Eden Theatre as the "oldest purpose-built cinema in operation".

== History ==
In 1895, it was the site of the first public showing of a film, “Arrivé d’un Train à La Ciotat“ (Arrival of a Train at La Ciotat), a film made by the Lumière brothers. Although by far the best known, this was not the first film shown at the Eden Theatre, which was “Barque Sortant du Port” (Boat leaving the Port).

In its early years, the Eden Theatre was used for vaudeville shows, concerts and plays, as well as boxing and wrestling events. This continued after it became a cinema, and featured such notable performers as Edith Piaf and Yves Montand.

In 1982, the manager of the cinema, Georges Giordana, was murdered during a robbery, and this was followed by years of serious financial troubles, culminating in closing of the cinema in 1995.

However, in 2013, after extensive refurbishment it was reopened and has again become a popular cinema.

In 2025, the Eden Théâtre took part in national events such as the Télérama Festival. It also received heritage recognition with the issuance of a postage stamp bearing its image by La Poste, printed in several hundred thousand copies.

In 2026, the cinema was ranked among the world’s best cinemas by Time Out. It also hosted a talk by producer Guillaume Sanjorge dedicated to the Duanju format. This intervention, linked to the Global Traffic Conference 2026 in Shenzhen, drew a parallel between the early days of cinema on the big screen and the rise of mobile-first fiction in China.

== Note ==
Ptuj City Cinema, the oldest Slovenian movie theater, has claims of being functionally older. While the Ptuj City Cinema’s first commercial public screening was on 3 March 1897, which is after 1895, the Ptuj theater could be the oldest continuously active cinema in the world.
