= McCleery Calendar Factory =

- U.S. National Register of Historic Places
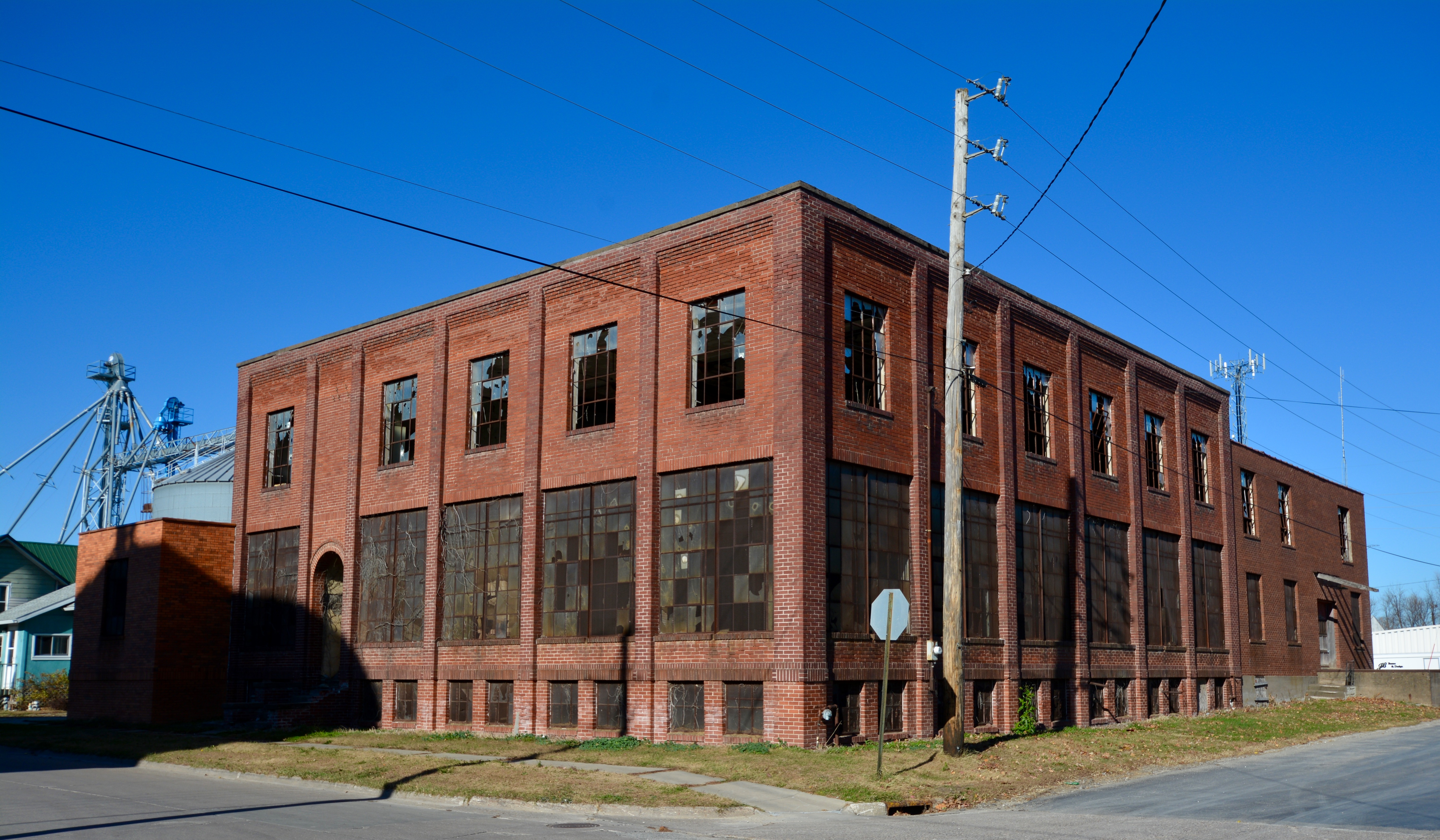

- Location within Iowa Location within the United States
- Location: 632 E. 3rd St. Washington, Iowa
- Coordinates: 41°18′05.3″N 91°41′05.6″W
- Area: less than one acre
- Built: 1923
- NRHP reference No.: 15000344
- Added to NRHP: June 16, 2015

The McCleery Calendar Factory, also known as The McCleery Company and McCleery-Cumming Company, is a historic building located in Washington, Iowa, United States. Hugh H. McCleery started the business in the basement of his home on East Main Street in 1905. He expanded into a small building behind his house in 1910 and then into a two-story building at the rear of his lot in 1913. This two-story brick structure was built two blocks to the north in 1923. The original section of the building was L-shaped and the "L" was filled in by an addition constructed in 1931. Another addition on the back of the building was completed in 1935. In 1944, McCleery acquired the calendar division of the Newman-Rudolph Lithographing Company of Chicago, and the company name was changed to the McCleery-Cumming Company. A single-story office addition was completed on the west side of the building the following year. The company produced calendars for distributors across the United States, who then sold them through their network of salesmen. Because of this, the McCleery-Cumming name was never on the calendars. By the late 1950s, they were the second-largest manufacturer of religious calendars in the country, and they became the largest employer in town. The company moved into a larger facility on the south side of town in 1958. They were locally owned through 1993 when the company was sold to Bemrose USA. They continued to operate the factory in Washington until 2004. This building was listed on the National Register of Historic Places in 2015.
