= Gracehill Moravian Church and Cemetery =

- U.S. National Register of Historic Places
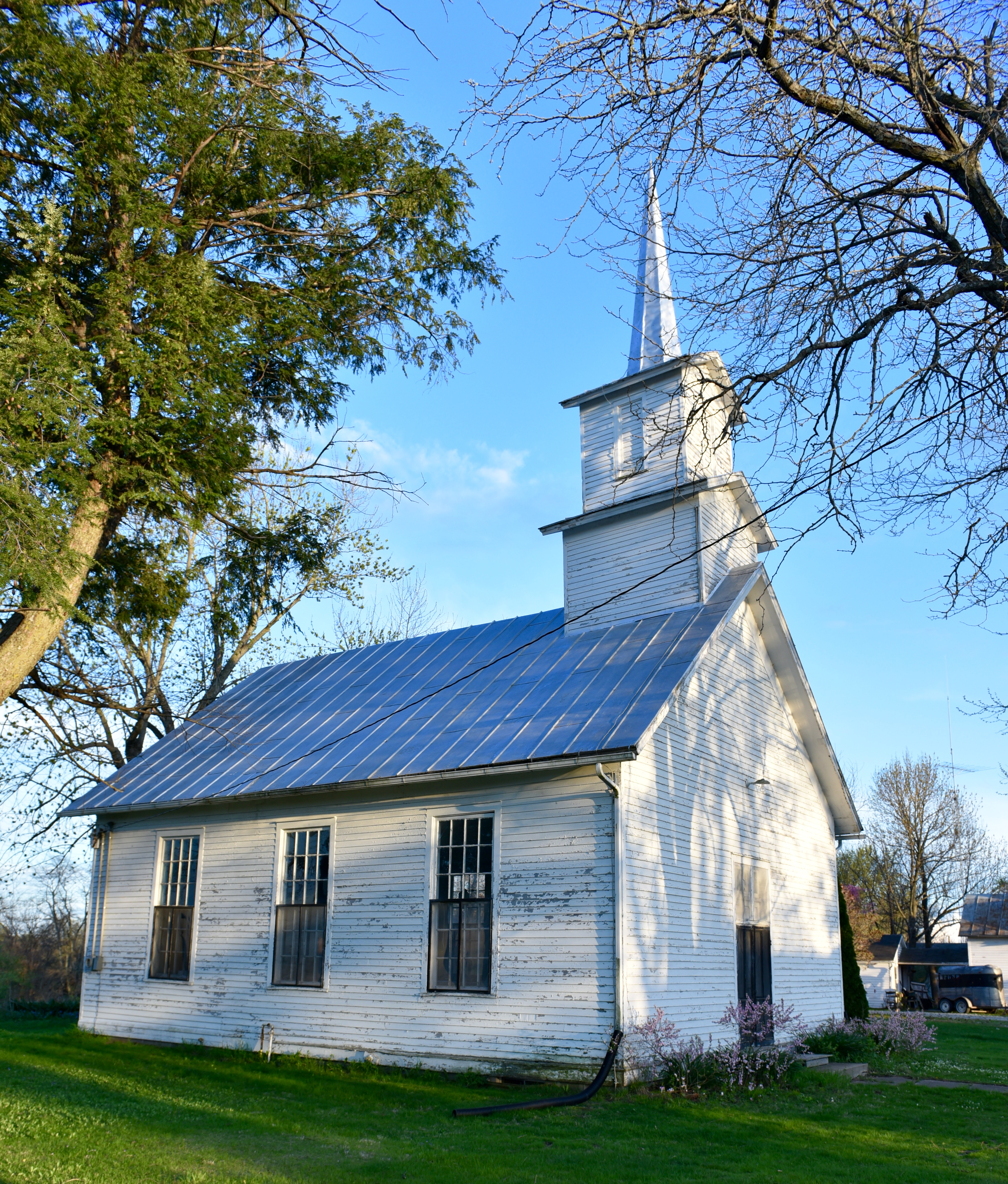
- Church in 2016

- Location within Iowa Location within the United States
- Location: 270 th St. and Ginkgo Ave.
- Nearest city: Washington, Iowa
- Coordinates: 41°15′47″N 91°49′44″W
- Area: 3 acres (1.2 ha)
- Built: 1867
- NRHP reference No.: 77000563
- Added to NRHP: August 12, 1977

Gracehill Moravian Church and Cemetery is a historic church and cemetery located in the small rural unincorporated community of Grace Hill (or Gracehill), which is located southwest of the county seat of Washington, Iowa, United States. It was added to the National Register of Historic Places in 1977.

== History ==
The name Gracehill reflects the religious aspirations of the founders of the settlement. There are also similarly-named places in other countries, for example Gracehill in Ireland. In 1854 the Provincial Board of the Moravian Church provided the funds to Amos Miksch to buy a substantial amount of property to create a Moravian settlement. Lots of various sizes were sold to colony members. Gracehill was organized in 1866, and the church building was completed the next year.

The cemetery was laid out the same year. The church is a simple rectangular, frame structure that measures 50 by 30 feet (15.2 by 9.1 m). A two-stage bell tower rises over the main entrance. From 1908 until it closed in 1970 Gracehill was the last of Iowa's seven Moravian communities. While the congregation continued until 1970, the last resident minister left in 1932. Graves in the cemetery were originally laid out with men on the north and women on the south. After the 1890s people were buried in family plots.
