= Alexander Young Cabin =

Historic house in Iowa, United States

- U.S. National Register of Historic Places
- U.S. Historic district – Contributing property
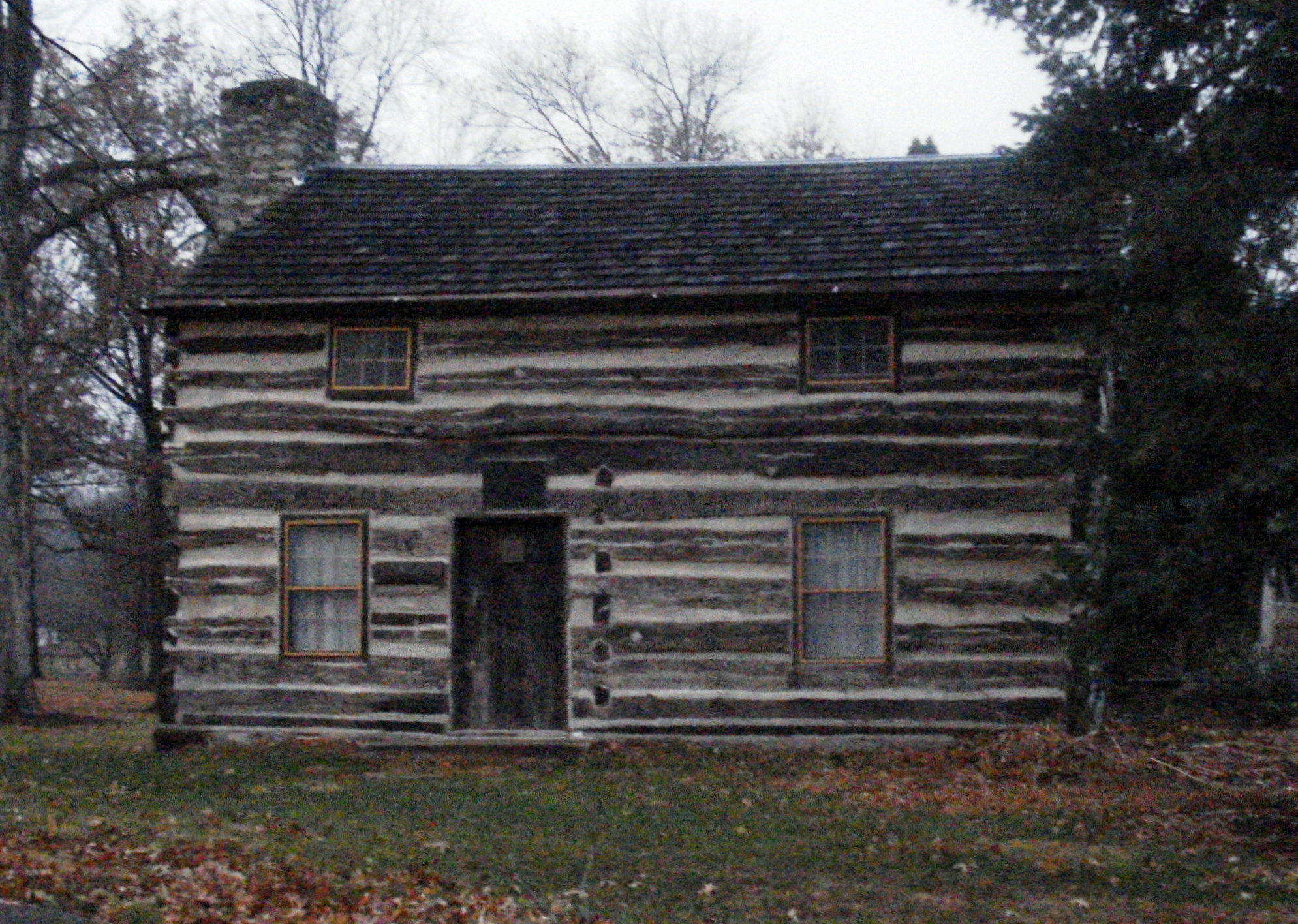

- Location within Iowa Location within the United States
- Location: W. Madison St. between G and H Aves. Washington, Iowa
- Coordinates: 41°17′49.33″N 91°42′8.07″W
- Area: less than one acre
- Built: 1840
- Built by: Alexander Young
- Part of: West Side Residential Historic District (ID13000297)
- MPS: Local
- NRHP reference No.: 100002919
- Added to NRHP: August 14, 1973

The Alexander Young Cabin is a historic building located in Washington, Iowa, United States. Alexander Young built this log cabin for his home in 1840, and it served as the family home for 36 years. It is the only cabin that has been preserved in Washington County. Besides a residence, the Young's opened their home to hospitality, overnight travelers, church services, the post office, and as a school for at least one term. The two remaining family members donated the cabin to the Daughters of the American Revolution in 1912 as a memorial to all pioneers. It was moved from its original location to Sunset Park in Washington. It was individually listed on the National Register of Historic Places in 1973. In 2018 it was included as a contributing property in the West Side Residential Historic District.
