= Washington Community School District =

Public school district in Washington, Iowa, United States

Coordinates: 41.299745°N 91.695892°W

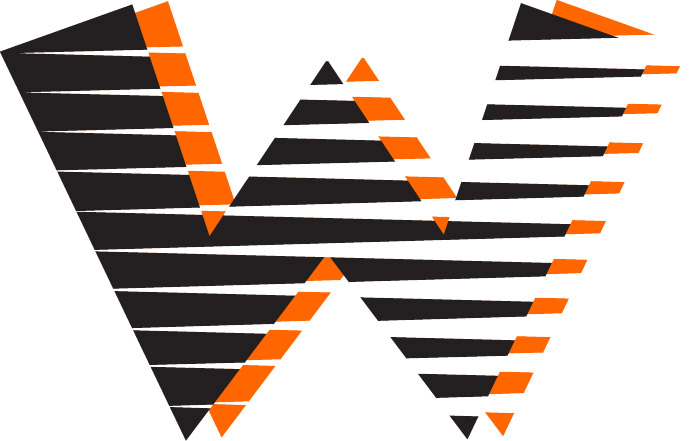

Location
- Washington, Iowa Washington and Jefferson counties United States
- Coordinates: 41.299745, -91.695892

District information
- Type: Local school district
- Grades: K-12
- Superintendent: Willie Stone
- Schools: 4
- Budget: $27,264,000 (2020-21)
- NCES District ID: 1930240

Students and staff
- Students: 1673 (2022-23)
- Teachers: 124.26 FTE
- Staff: 155.16 FTE
- Student–teacher ratio: 13.46
- Athletic conference: Southeast Conference
- District mascot: Demons
- Colors: Orange and Black

Other information
- Website: www.washington.k12.ia.us

The Washington Community School District, or Washington Community Schools, is a rural public school district based in Washington, Iowa. The district is mainly in Washington County, with a small area in Jefferson County, and serves the towns of Washington and Brighton, and surrounding rural areas.

The school's mascot is the Demons. Their colors are orange and black.

== Schools ==
The district operates four schools, all in Washington:

- Stewart Elementary School
- Lincoln Upper Elementary School
- Washington Middle School
- Washington High School

== See also ==
- List of school districts in Iowa
