= Gracehill Moravian Church =

Church in County Antrim, Northern Ireland

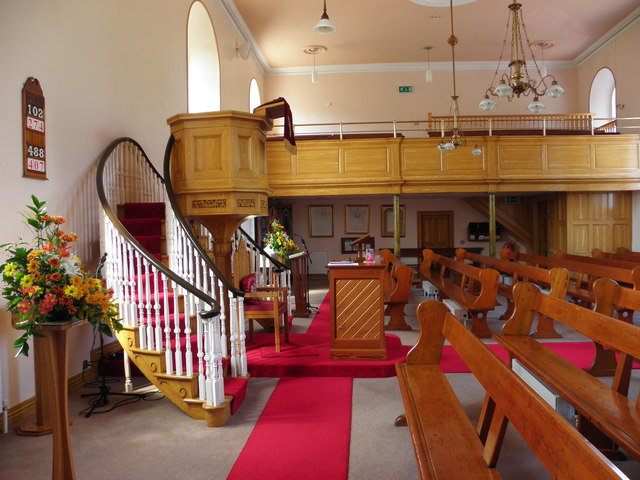

- Location in Northern Ireland
- 54°51′12″N 6°19′39″W
- Location: Gracehill, County Antrim

History
- Built: 1759

Listed Building – Grade A

Gracehill Moravian Church is the church of the Moravian settlement of Gracehill, County Antrim in Northern Ireland. A prominent feature is the raised pulpit, reflecting the importance Protestant churches give to preaching. The organ, which is in one of the galleries, is also prominent.

== History ==
A number of Moravian congregations were established in Ulster, and some survive, but the Moravian Church only has a small presence on the island of Ireland. As a planned Moravian settlement, Gracehill is unique not only in Ulster, but in Ireland. Gracehill Moravian Church was founded in 1759. The village was built around the church and the church owned all of the buildings in the village as a result. The church established the village with it being planned to be separated into a male and female side either side of the church.

During the Irish Rebellion of 1798, United Irishmen rebels attempted to intimidate the church into joining the rebellion, the church refused with only one adherent joining the armed rebellion but the church later provided sanctuary to rebels fleeing government forces. Gracehill also acted as a repository for Moravian Church records in Ireland, with Moravian churches as far as Dublin storing official church records at Gracehill.

== Conservation ==
The 18th-century building has had a heritage listing (Grade A listed) since 1975, with the whole area around it being designated as Northern Ireland's first conservation area. The pulpit was noted as being along the longest wall of the church rather than conventionally at the front. In 2024, the church and village of Gracehill was declared a World Heritage Site.
