= Pierce Knox =

Pierce Knox (June 1, 1921 - September 19, 1985) was a blind xylophone and marimba player who toured from coast to coast and in Canada during the 1940s and 1950s. He achieved fame by winning the $5,000 grand prize on the Horace Heidt Original Youth Opportunity television show by performing the "Second Hungarian Rhapsody" on the xylophone.

== Biography ==
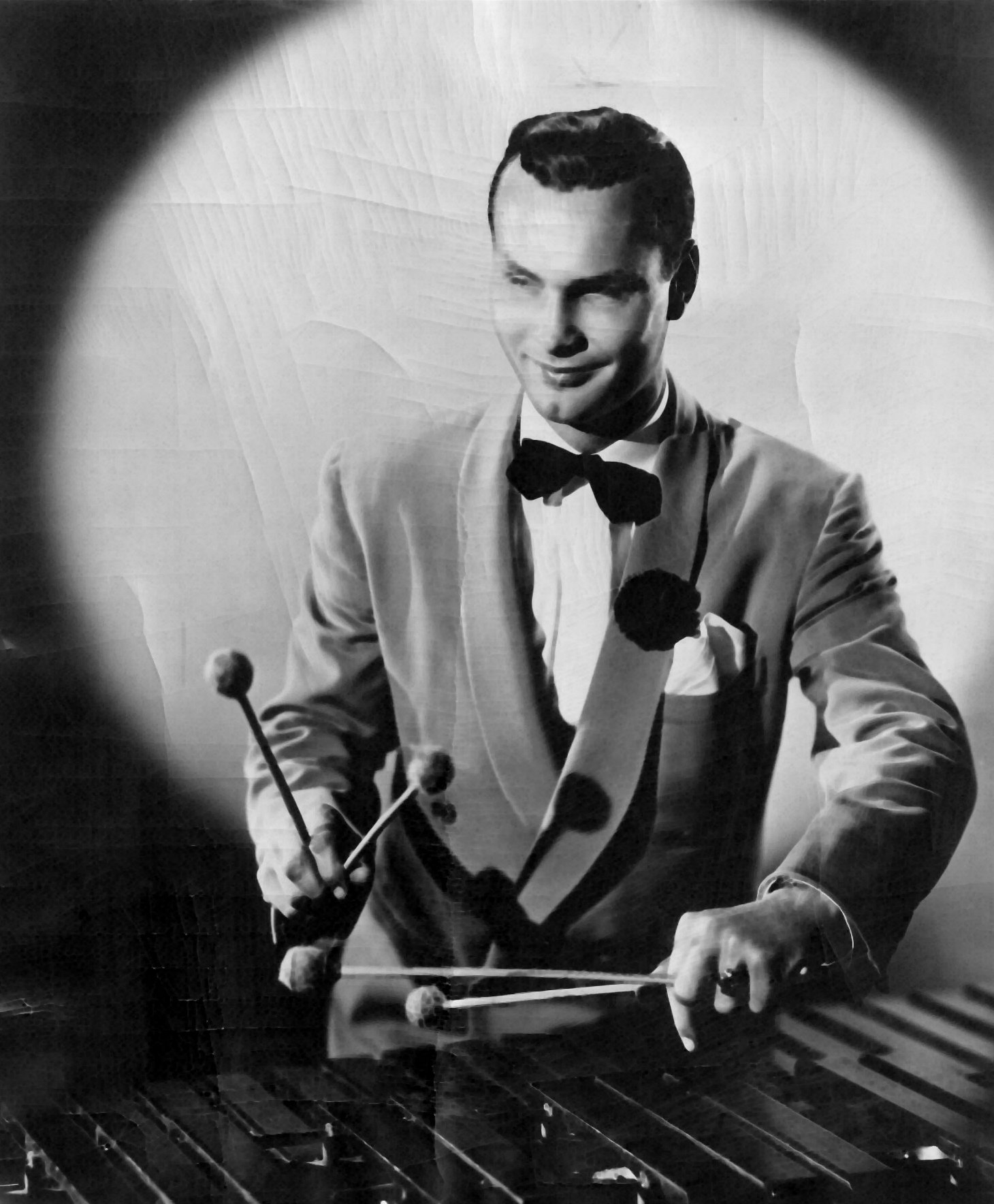
Pierce Knox 1950

Born in Washington, Iowa, Pierce Knox lost his sight at the age of 4 after contracting spinal meningitis. Knox attended public schools in Iowa and for a time attended a state school for the blind where he learned to read Braille and to otherwise cope with his permanent blindness. He had a natural talent for music and experimented with the drums. When he was 12 his parents purchased a marimba for him and he was soon playing the instrument, a close cousin to the xylophone. The family relocated to California and Knox entered the public school system and graduated from high school. He became somewhat of a local celebrity playing at assemblies and school dances. Following graduation, he decided to make entertainment a profession, and for five years played the high school and college circuit throughout the United States and Canada. Knox played for the Ripley's Believe It Or Not program at the 1939-40 World's Fair in New York and later continued to tour many high schools and colleges to demonstrate that his blindness did not limit his musical ability and accomplishments.

He soon achieved national recognition when he earned a place in the finals of the Horace Heidt Original Youth Opportunity radio show during the programs first year in 1947. His popularity with listeners and audiences prompted the host to sign Knox as a regular member of the touring company. In 1950 he joined Heidt's Air Force sponsored tour of American bases. When Heidt's television series began, Knox again qualified for the grand finals by winning 13 times in the weekly competitions. His xylophone rendition of "Second Hungarian Rhapsody" by Liszt, brought him the $5,000 grand prize and the championship crown in the TV series.

During the next three years he was a Horace Heidt regular, playing at Army installations in Germany, France and Vienna, and before civilian audiences in Paris, Berlin and Munich. Upon his return to the States, he performed as a soloist, at times with theater or hotel bands and with other musical acts. He was represented by New York–based talent agent Jack Segal who was known for representing talented but unusual acts. Based in New York, he eventually limited his engagements to cities east of Chicago. He retired to Inverness, Florida in the late 1970s and died on September 19, 1985.
