= Frank Stewart House =

Historic house in Iowa, United States

- U.S. National Register of Historic Places
- U.S. Historic district – Contributing property
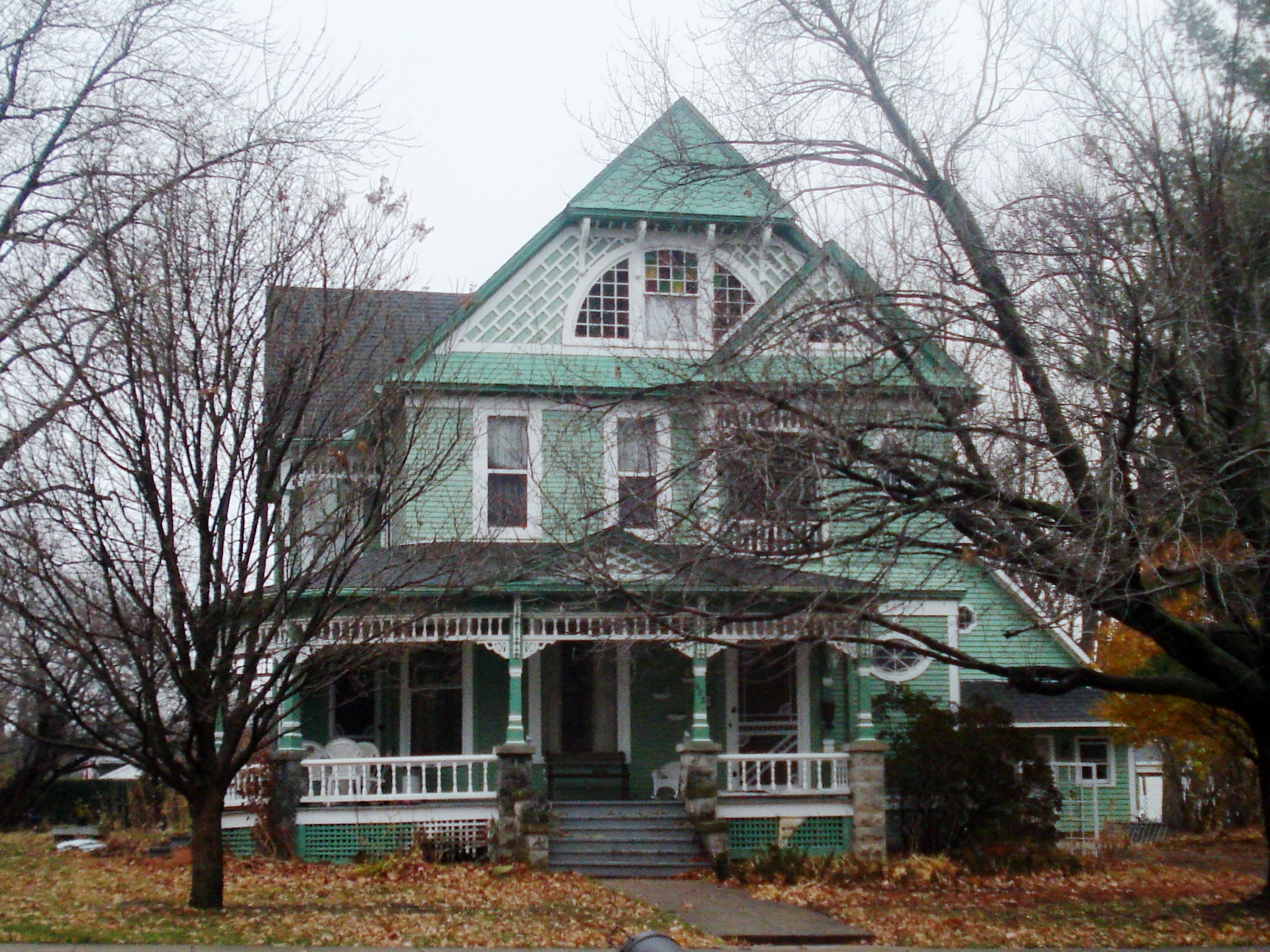

- Location within Iowa Location within the United States
- Location: 603 W. Washington St. Washington, Iowa
- Coordinates: 41°17′54″N 91°41′51″W
- Area: less than one acre
- Built: 1889-1894
- Built by: James A. McCutcheon
- Architect: C.F. Dunham
- Architectural style: Queen Anne
- Part of: West Side Residential Historic District (ID13000297)
- NRHP reference No.: 87002021
- Added to NRHP: November 16, 1987

The Frank Stewart House, also known as the Marian Stewart Bailey House, is a historic building located in Washington, Iowa, United States. Frank Stewart was a successful eastern Iowa businessman who was also involved in community affairs. Among other responsibilities, he served as a Park Commissioner in Washington. His only child, Marian Stewart Bailey, also held that position. The house is a two-story, frame, Queen Anne with an asymmetrical design. The structure follows a simple cross-gable plan, but the facade projection is offset. Both gables of the main facade feature decorative millwork of diagonal patterns. There is also a wrap-around porch on the main floor with several porches on the second floor. The house was individually listed on the National Register of Historic Places in 1987. In 2018 it was included as a contributing property in the West Side Residential Historic District.
