= Washington High School (Washington, Iowa) =

Location
- 1111 S Avenue B Washington, Iowa 52353; United States

Information
- Type: Public high school
- Established: 1912; 114 years ago
- Superintendent: Willie Stone
- Principal: Teresa Beenblossom
- Teaching staff: 27.48 (FTE)
- Grades: 9–12
- Enrollment: 435 (2023–2024)
- Student to teacher ratio: 15.83
- Colors: Orange and Black
- Athletics conference: Southeast Conference
- Mascot: Demon
- Newspaper: Washingtonian
- Yearbook: Hi-Life
- Website: washington.k12.ia.us/schools/washington_high_school

Washington High School is a public high school in Washington, Iowa, United States. It serves students in grades 9 through 12 as part of the Washington Community School District and competes athletically in the Southeast Conference. The school operates on a block schedule of four 86-minute periods, with the academic year divided into four terms.

== History ==
Washington High School was established in 1912. Its historic building, completed in 1918, housed the high school until 2012, when the high school and the district's middle school exchanged buildings; the high school moved into a newly constructed facility on the same campus.

In March 2023, the district began a two-phase, approximately $26 million expansion and renovation project intended to return the middle school to the high school campus. The first phase, which added a two-story classroom wing, a culinary classroom, an art room, and an additional gymnasium, opened for the 2024–2025 school year. The second phase, a renovation of the building's east wing, was scheduled for completion in 2025.

== Athletics ==
The Demons compete in the Southeast Conference in the following sports:

- Baseball (boys)
- Basketball (boys and girls)
  - Boys' 1986 Class 2A State Champions
  - Girls' three-time Class 3A State Champions (1999, 2000, 2001)
- Cross country (boys and girls)
- Football
- Golf (boys and girls)
  - 2008 Class 1A coed State Champions
  - Girls Class 3A State Champions (2007, 2008, 2021)
- Soccer (boys and girls)
- Softball (girls)
- Swimming (boys and girls)
- Tennis (boys and girls)
- Track and field (boys and girls)
  - Boys' 1998 Class 3A State Champions
- Volleyball (girls)
- Wrestling

== Notable alumni ==
- Mike Hennigan – American football player and coach (born 1951)
- Keith Molesworth – American football player and coach (1905–1966) (Class of 1923)
- Randy Florke – American real estate, design executive (born 1962)

== See also ==
- List of high schools in Iowa
