= H.A. Baxter Coal Company Historic District =

Historic district in Iowa, United States

- H.A. Baxter Coal Company; Historic District
- U.S. National Register of Historic Places
- U.S. Historic district
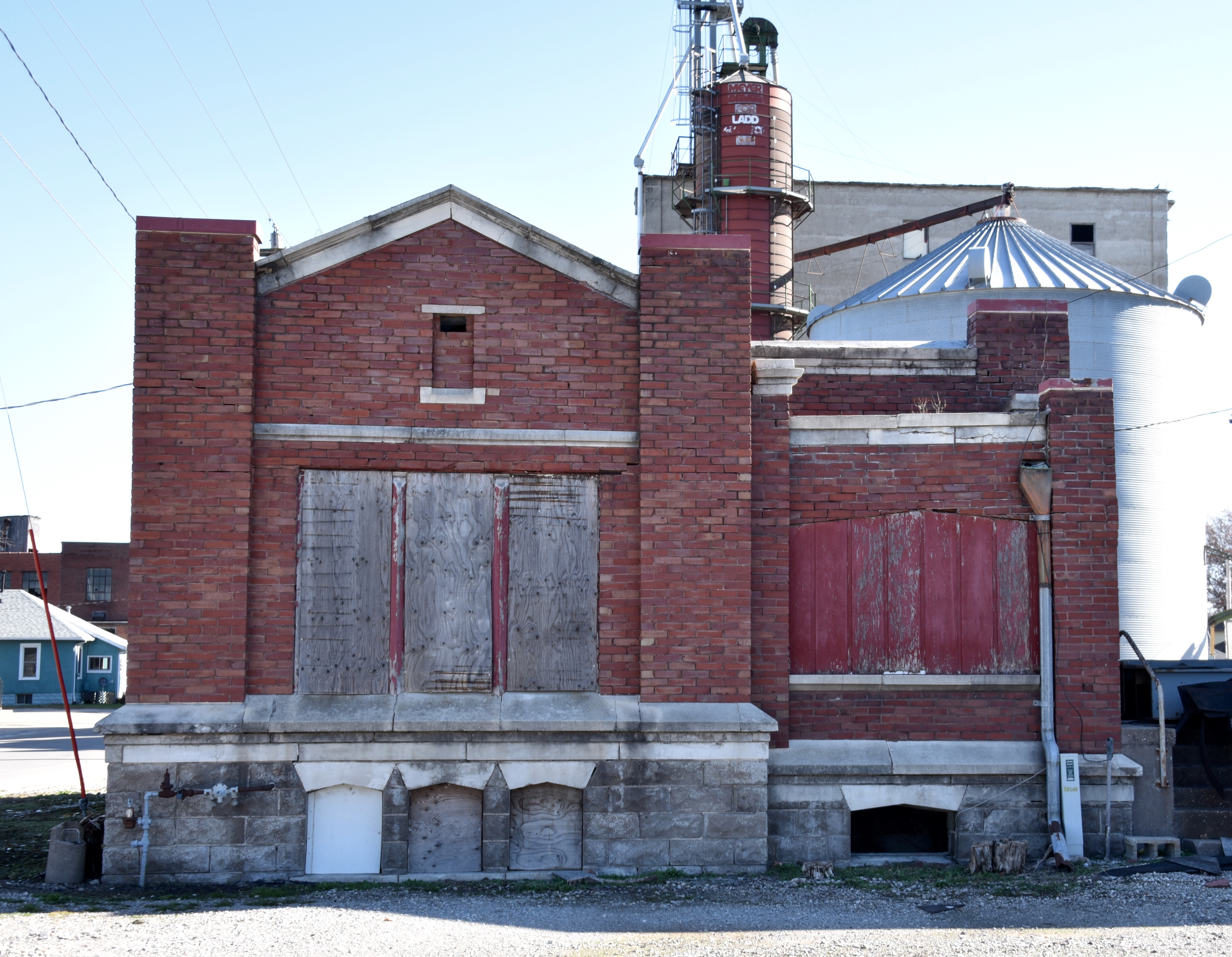
- Office building (1912)

- Location within Iowa Location within the United States
- Location: 601 E. 3rd St. Washington, Iowa
- Coordinates: 41°18′3.9″N 91°41′7.6″W
- Area: less than one acre
- NRHP reference No.: 15000343
- Added to NRHP: June 15, 2015

The H.A. Baxter Coal Company Historic District, also known as C.E. Phillips Coal and Grain and Freshwaters Coal and Supply, is a nationally recognized historic district located in Washington, Iowa, United States. It was listed on the National Register of Historic Places in 2015. At the time of its nomination it contained six resources, which included four contributing buildings, one contributing structure, and one non-contributing structure. By 1910 there were five businesses in Washington that sold coal to retail customers. All of them sold coal in conjunction with at least one other commodity. Henry A. Baxter was a dealer in coal, grain, and building materials. Baxter bought a grain elevator, no longer extant, on this site in 1903. He then had new buildings constructed in the 1910s and 1920s. Baxter was the only coal dealer in town that operated a coal elevator. Baxter died in 1929, and his company continued to operate through the 1930s. It became the Palmer Coal Company and Bush Coal Company in the early 1940s. Howard F. Freshwaters bought the property in 1945. Freshwaters Coal and Supply operated here from 1945 to 1959. Coal usage declined through the 1950s as natural gas replaced it for heating buildings. In 1959, Freshwaters Feed and Grain Company moved to this location from downtown. They continued to offer coal for sale into the early 1970s, and they were the last business in Washington to do so.

The contributing buildings include the brick office building (1912), the concrete block delivery stables (c. 1912), the concrete block/stucco garage (c. 1922), and the frame/metal feed warehouse (c. 1940). The concrete coal elevator (c. 1920) is the contributing structure. The non-contributing structure is a metal grain bin (1972).
