= Gracehill =

World Heritage Site in Northern Ireland

Coordinates: 54°51′N 6°20′W

UNESCO World Heritage Site
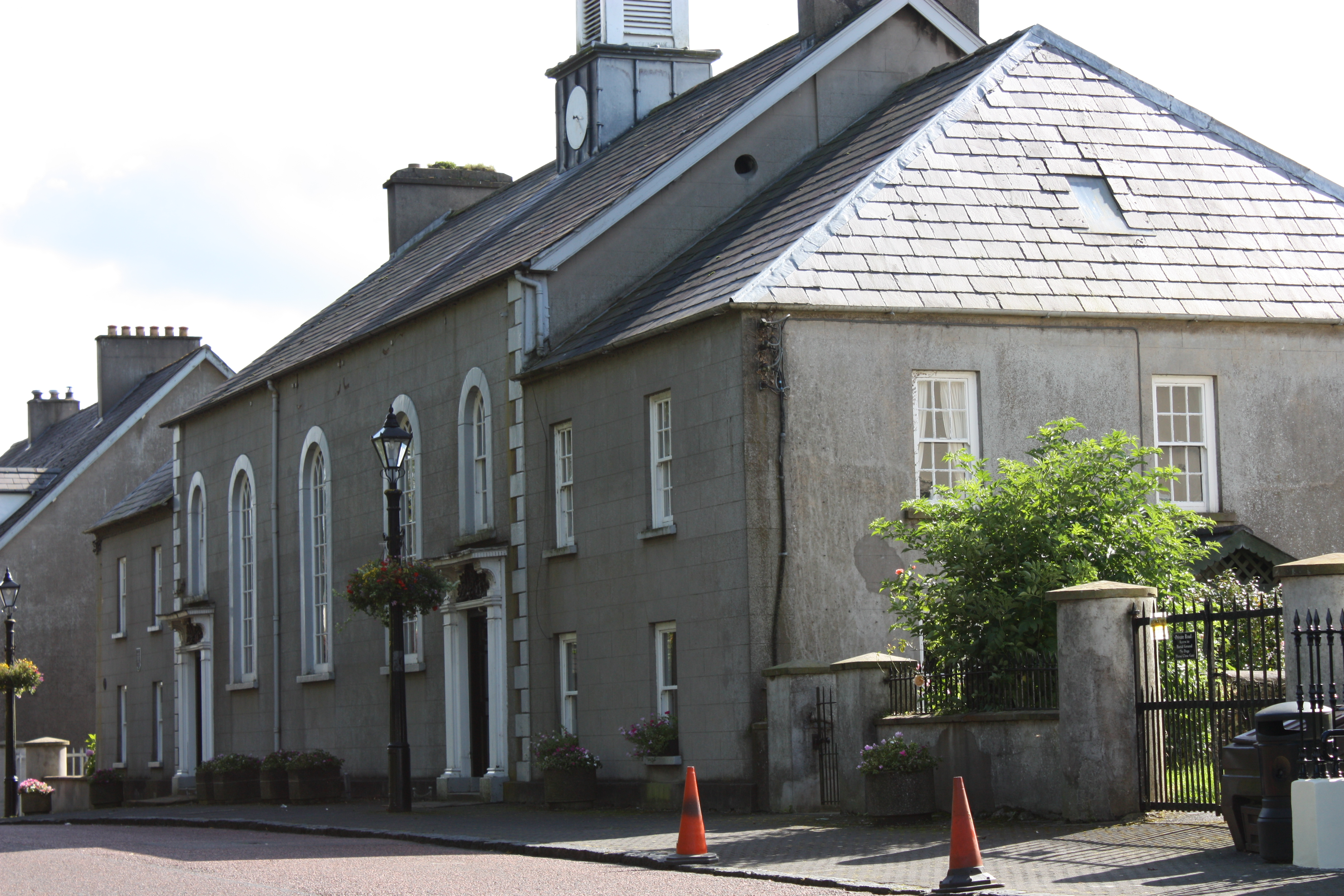
- Moravian church in Gracehill, 2009
- Interactive map of Gracehill
- Official name: Gracehill
- Part of: Moravian Church Settlements
- Criteria: Cultural: (iii), (iv)
- Reference: 1468
- Inscription: 2015 (39th Session)
- Extensions: 2024

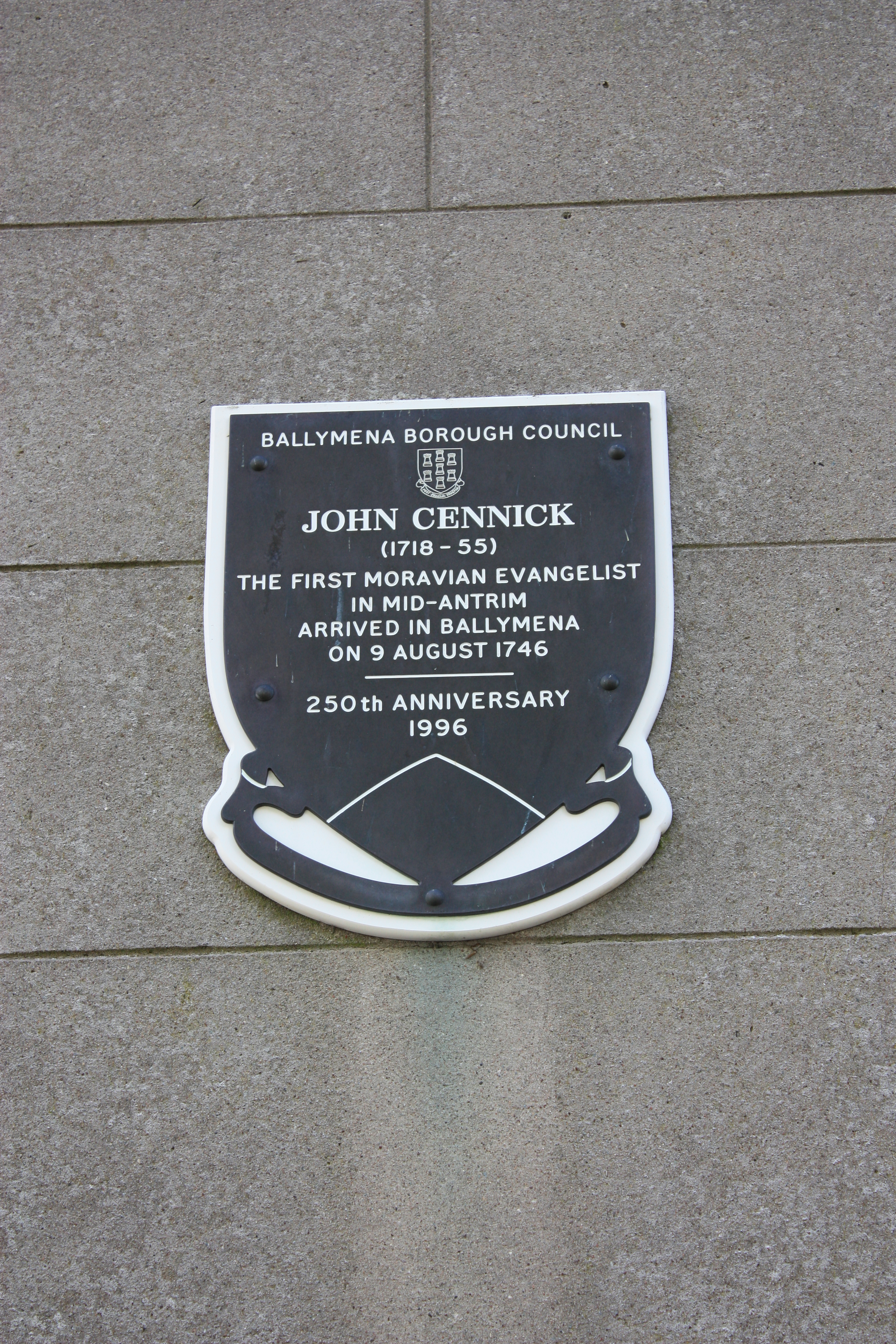
John Cennick plaque, Gracehill, September 2009

Gracehill is a village in County Antrim, Northern Ireland. It lies about 1.9 miles from Ballymena and is in the townland of Ballykennedy (from Irish: Baile Uí Chinnéide). It is part of the Borough of Mid & East Antrim.

The village is unique in Ireland as a Moravian planned settlement. The name Gracehill reflects the religious aspirations of the founders. There were also similarly named settlements in other countries, for example Gracehill in the United States.

Gracehill was granted UNESCO World Heritage site status in 2024.

== History ==
The village now known as Gracehill was originally a plot of land in the Ballykennedy townland that was ruled by Lord O'Neill. Gracehill was established as a Moravian planned settlement in 1746 by Reverend John Cennick. Lord O'Neill agreed to lease about 200 plantation acres of land to Reverend John Cenwick which was divided into smaller portions among the Moravian settlers (otherwise known as the Brethren). The Moravian settlers were German-speaking Protestants. The building of Gracehill began on April 26, 1763. The Reverend John Cenwick had received much push-back in attempting to start building the settlement from the original tenants that Lord O'Neill had removed from the site. O'Neill had only given these tenants 12 months' notice to leave with no compensation for the loss of their lands. However, this push-back eventually ended and the first building to be created in Gracehill town was the Brethren's shop which the town creators thought was vital to the economic and overall prosperity of the town. This building was able to press forward as the Moravian town creators requested to borrow £2000 from the Moravian Directory which they received within 6 months of asking.

In the year 1837, the village was a great success. The plan of the settlement was in a quadrangle shape and built outwards from the middle. The village consisted of 39 family residents who were all Moravian church members, most of which resided in small cottages. Each resident had sufficient land surrounding their property to grow potatoes and keep a farm animal. The village was decorated with shrubbery and bushes throughout with any new buildings created for specific religious purposes including two principal houses for unmarried brethren and sisters. The principal house for unmarried brethren was also used as a daily school for young boys and girls, including those who were not residents of Gracehill, and a boarding school for young gentlemen. The village also contained a small linen manufacturer to sustain itself.

=== Conservation ===
Gracehill is a Conservation Area protected under the Planning Act (Northern Ireland) 2011. It has a number of listed buildings, including the church and old school.

- Gracehill Church is a Grade A listed building
- The old Gracehill school building is a Grade B listed building.

The two-storey, 10-bay Georgian-style school dates back to 1765. In the 19th century, as well as teaching local children, it offered boarding facilities to those who did not reside in the village. This building was still holding classes until the year 1999, but became derelict due to dry rot and fire damage. A local Building Preservation Trust was set up to attempt to turn this original school building into a historical centre for the town.

==== World Heritage Site ====
Due to the strong historical background, the county council and the Gracehill Old School Trust rallied to have Gracehill recognised as Northern Ireland's second World Heritage Site. The success of the bid sees the town ranked alongside The Giant's Causeway, but as a cultural rather than a natural site. The site was nominated as part of a transnational effort led by the United States to achieve World Heritage status for Moravian Church settlements founded in the 18th century. Other sites included in the nomination were Bethlehem, Pennsylvania, and Herrnhut in Germany, which joined Christiansfeld, a Danish site that already enjoyed World Heritage status.

== Sport ==
Galgorm Castle Golf Club, a 220-acre 18 hole golf course, is located in the area.

== Notable people ==
- Jane Lewers Gray (1796-1871), American poet and hymnwriter
- Albert E. S. Smythe (1861–1947), Canadian journalist

== See also ==
- List of villages in Northern Ireland
- List of towns in Northern Ireland
