= Eva Carter Buckner =

African-American suffragist (b. 1861, d. 1946)

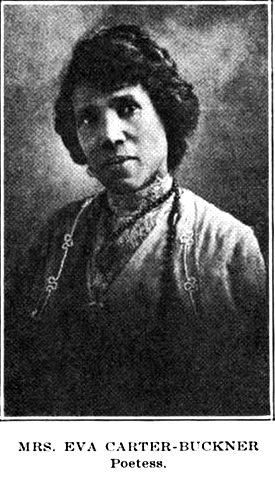
- Eva Carter Buckner, from a 1919 publication.
- Born: Eva Carter; 1881; Washington, Iowa
- Died: February 15, 1946 (aged 64–65); Los Angeles, California
- Occupations: Writer (poet, songwriter); suffragist

Eva Carter Buckner (1861 – February 15, 1946) was a prominent African-American suffragist, poet, and songwriter.

== Early life ==
Eva Carter was born in 1861 in Washington, Iowa. Both of her parents were from Pennsylvania. As a child, she lived with her family in Des Moines, Iowa, and Colorado Springs, Colorado, where she attended public school. Buckner began writing poetry as a student in Colorado Springs, where she won a poetry contest run by Mrs. J. D. Robinson, the mayor's wife.

== Career ==
=== Writing ===
Buckner was a well-known poet and songwriter, whose work inspired African American voices in both the women's suffrage movement and the civil rights movement. Buckner's poetry appeared in the Denver Post, The Colorado Springs Sun, The Western Enterprise, the Advocate, and The Daily Tribune of Los Angeles. Her songs were used in both the Colorado and California meetings of Colored Women's Clubs.

=== Political activity ===
Buckner was a member of the Los Angeles Forum of Colored Women, and shared her poetry at their meetings. She was also active in the National Association for the Advancement of Colored People (NAACP), working for the NAACP school committee of Los Angeles.

As former chair of suffrage for the California State Federation of Colored Women's Clubs, she was among the activists invited to comment on the death of Anna Howard Shaw in 1919. In 1922, she campaigned for Friend W. Richardson in the California gubernatorial race. In 1928, she was general chair of outreach to black women for the Herbert Hoover presidential campaign in southern California.

== Personal life ==
Eva Carter Buckner moved to Los Angeles around 1910. She was married to Edward Buckner; they had three children: Mabel, Eugenia, and Garrie. Eva Carter Buckner died February 15, 1946, in Los Angeles.
