= Albert E. S. Smythe =

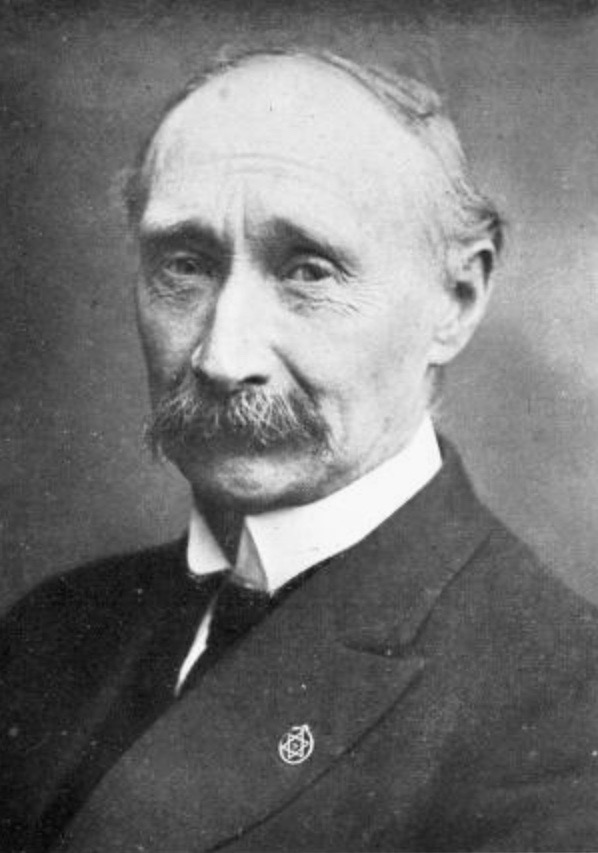
- Smythe in 1919.
- Born: 27 December 1861; Gracehill, County Antrim, Ireland
- Died: 6 October 1947 (aged 85); Hamilton, Ontario, Canada
- Occupations: Journalist; Theosophist; Writer

Albert Ernest Stafford Smythe (27 December 1861 – 6 October 1947) was an Irish-born Canadian journalist, poet, and leader in the theosophy movement in Canada who founded the Toronto Theosophical Society. He was the father of sportsman and businessman Conn Smythe, who owned the Toronto Maple Leafs hockey team from 1927 to 1980.

== Life and career ==
Smythe was born in Gracehill, County Antrim, Ireland on 27 December 1861 to a poor Protestant family. His parents were Stafford Smythe and Leonora Cary. Smythe was largely self-taught and read widely. At school he won prizes in geology, botany, and physics.

When he was eighteen Smythe lost all his belongings in a shipwreck while attempting to travel to New York. In 1884 he emigrated to the United States, and on the ship there met the Irish theosophist William Quan Judge. After some time in Chicago, he spent 1887 to 1889 in Scotland. He emigrated to Canada that year and married Mary Adelaide Constantine on board the ship there and moved to Toronto in September 1889 as an agent for the Portland Cement Company, with whom he was employed for about five years.

During his journalism career Smythe worked for the Toronto Globe and Toronto Star, and later edited the Hamilton Herald (from 1928) and The Toronto World.

In 1891 Smythe published his first book of poetry, Poems Grave and Gay, and founded the Toronto Theosophical Society that 16 February and served as its first president. He was the Society's primary leader for the next forty years. He worked unpaid for the theosophical publications The Lamp and Canadian Theosophist.

In an article in the Canadian Theosophist in 1928 Smythe criticized the antisemitic and anti-Catholic writings in The Chalice by Brother XII, the English mystic Edward Arthur Wilson who had become influential in Canadian theosophist circles.

According to Greg Gatenby Smythe was "one of the best known newspaper men in Canada, and serious critics would call him one of the best poets in the nation". His writing was influenced by the Celtic Revival of such writers as fellow theosophists W. B. Yeats and George William Russell; he corresponded with Russell, as well as with Emma Goldman, and associated with radical thinkers and writers.

Smythe died 6 October 1947 at St. Joseph's Hospital in Hamilton, Ontario.

== Personal life ==
Smythe had two children with his first wife Mary Adelaide Constantine: Mary (1891–1903) and Conn (1895–1980). The couple had little in common: Smythe was a teetotaller and spiritual seeker, while his wife was a fun-loving alcoholic whose drinking left Smythe with most of the child-rearing duties and drove her to an early death in 1906. The daughter Mary died of a thyroid disorder in 1903. In c. 1912–13 Smythe remarried to Jane Henderson, a Presbyterian also from Ireland, with whom he had a daughter, Moira.
