= Ptuj City Cinema =

World oldest active movie theater in Slovenia

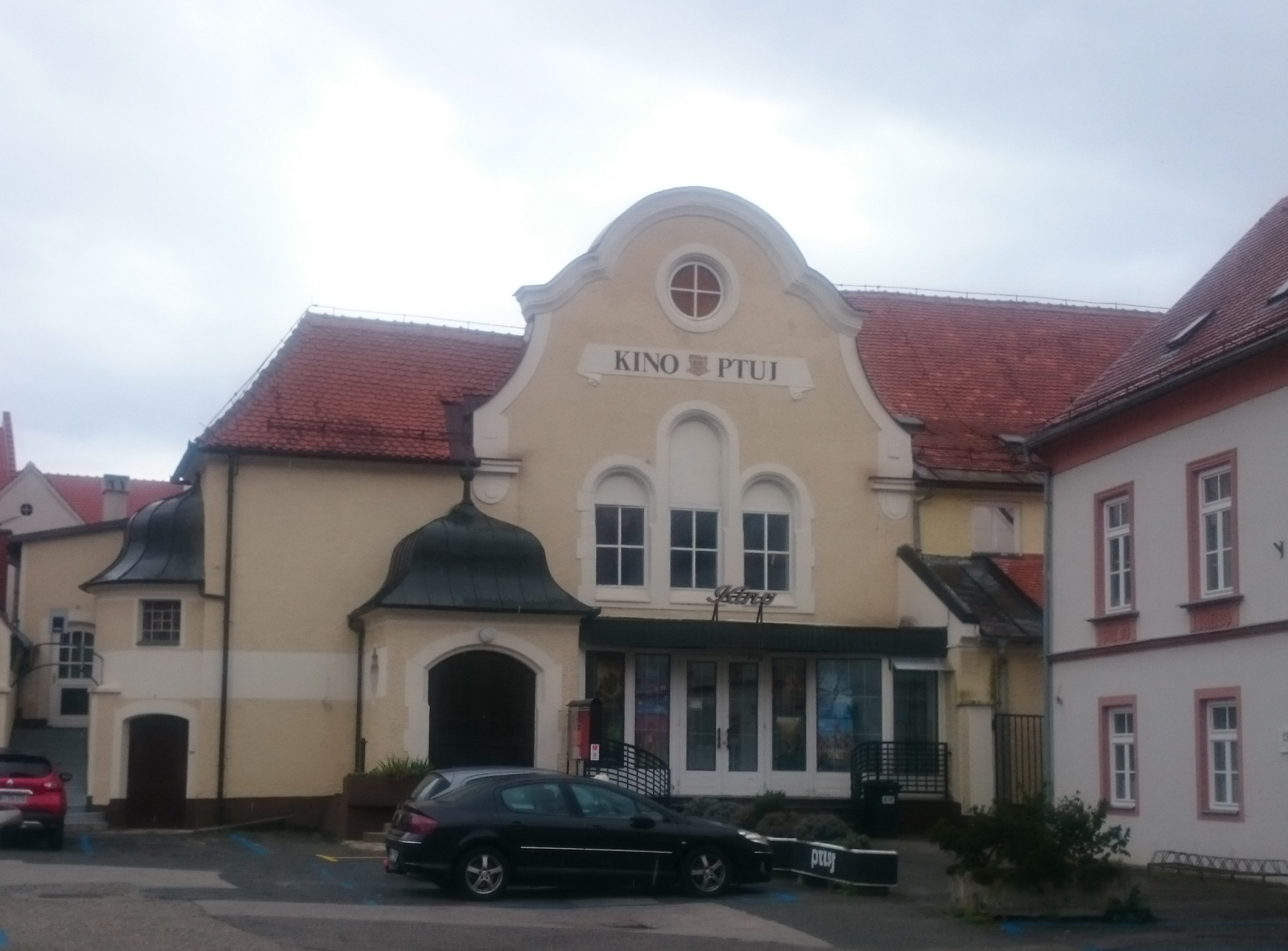
- Interactive map of Ptuj City Cinema
- Former names: Kazina; Nemški društveni dom Kino-Royal; Titov dom
- Address: Cvetkov trg 1 Ptuj, Slovenia
- Coordinates: 46°25′09″N 15°52′09″E
- Screen: 2 (Currently)

Construction
- Opened: March 3, 1897; 129 years ago

Ptuj City Cinema (Slovene: Mestni kino Ptuj) is a cinema located in Ptuj, the oldest historically documented town in Slovenia. It opened on 3 March 1897, which would make it the oldest movie theater still operating in the world.

Currently, Guinness World Records recognizes the Eden Theatre (France) as the oldest purpose built cinema in operation and the State Theatre (Washington, Iowa) as the oldest continually operating movie theater in the world. However, the State Theatre’s first movie showing was in May 1897, after the Ptuj City Cinema’s first movie showing on 3 March 1897.

Ptuj City Cinema has two screening rooms; the bigger room has capacity of 163 seats but, in the past, had capacities of 362, 377, 391 and, at its maximum, 410 seats. A newer, smaller screening room in the cinema has only 30 seats.

The big room changed name several times over the years; Kazina (1897–1900), Nemški društveni dom (1900–39), Kino-Royal (1939–45), Titov dom (1945–46) and Mestni kino Ptuj since 1946.

Unlike modern totally dark room multiplexes, this cinema still maintains more old fashioned insight, classic look style. It underwent major renovations in 1912, 1939, 1989 and 2025.
