= Joseph Keck House =

Historic house in Iowa, United States

- U.S. National Register of Historic Places
- U.S. Historic district – Contributing property
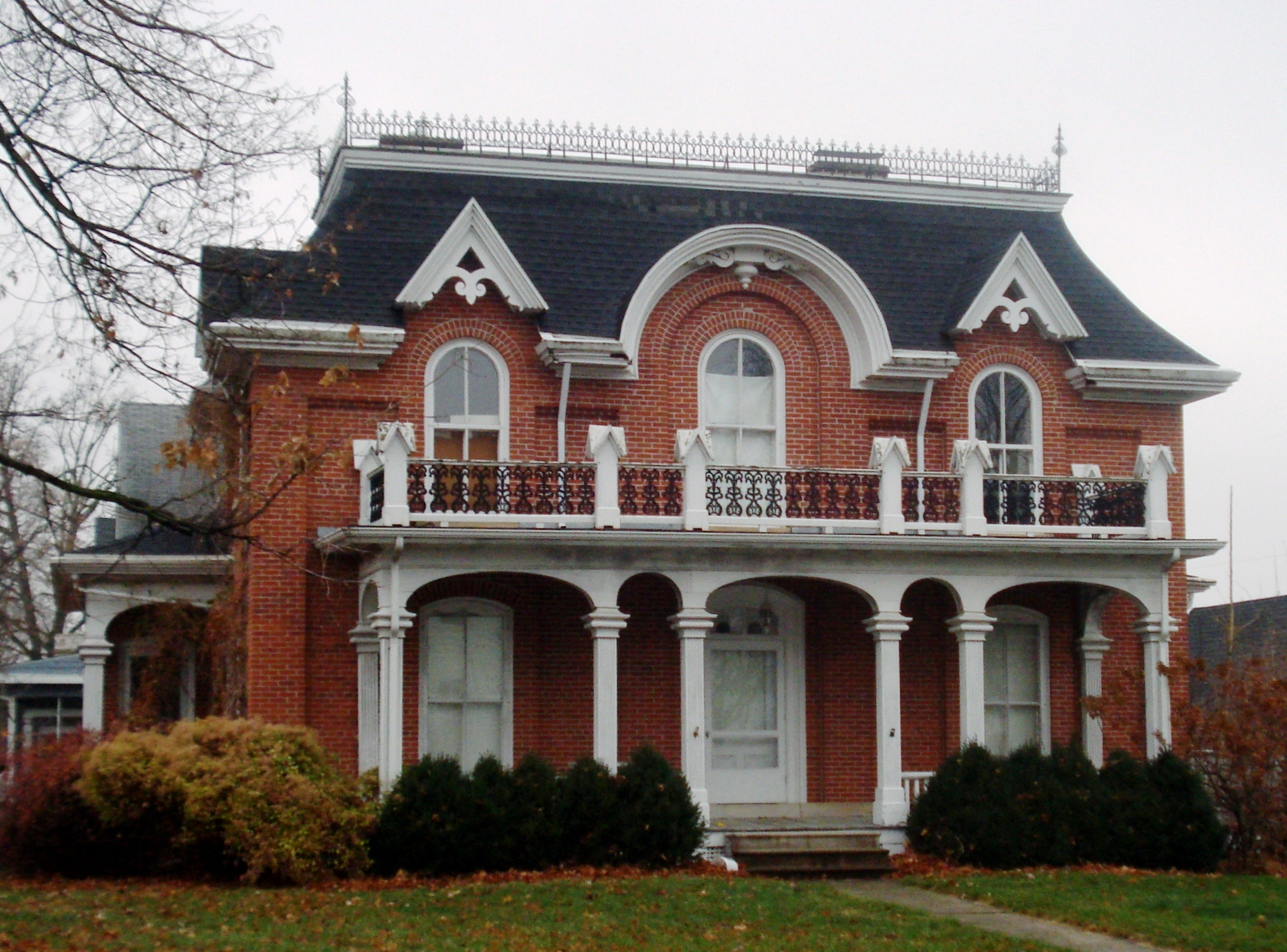

- Location within Iowa Location within the United States
- Location: 903 E. Washington St. Washington, Iowa
- Coordinates: 41°17′55.58″N 91°41′49.49″W
- Area: less than one acre
- Built: c. 1860
- Part of: West Side Residential Historic District (ID13000297)
- NRHP reference No.: 78001268
- Added to NRHP: November 28, 1978

The Joseph Keck House, is a historic building located in Washington, Iowa, United States. Joseph Keck was a native of Pennsylvania who was trained as a carpenter and eventually became a banker. He married Elizabeth Jackson in 1844. Her family owned the property the house was built on. The Kecks lived in a small house that had been built here previously. Once he received the title to the land in 1855, Keck had this house built sometime in the mid to late 1850s. The two-story brick house is a well preserved, example of French mansard residential architecture. Other architectural styles represented in the house include the Gothic balustrade and vergeboard, the Greek Revival acroterion and finial, and the Italianate porch arcade. The house was individually listed on the National Register of Historic Places in 1978. In 2018 it was included as a contributing property in the West Side Residential Historic District.
