= Kurtz House (Washington, Iowa) =

Historic house in Iowa, United States

- U.S. National Register of Historic Places
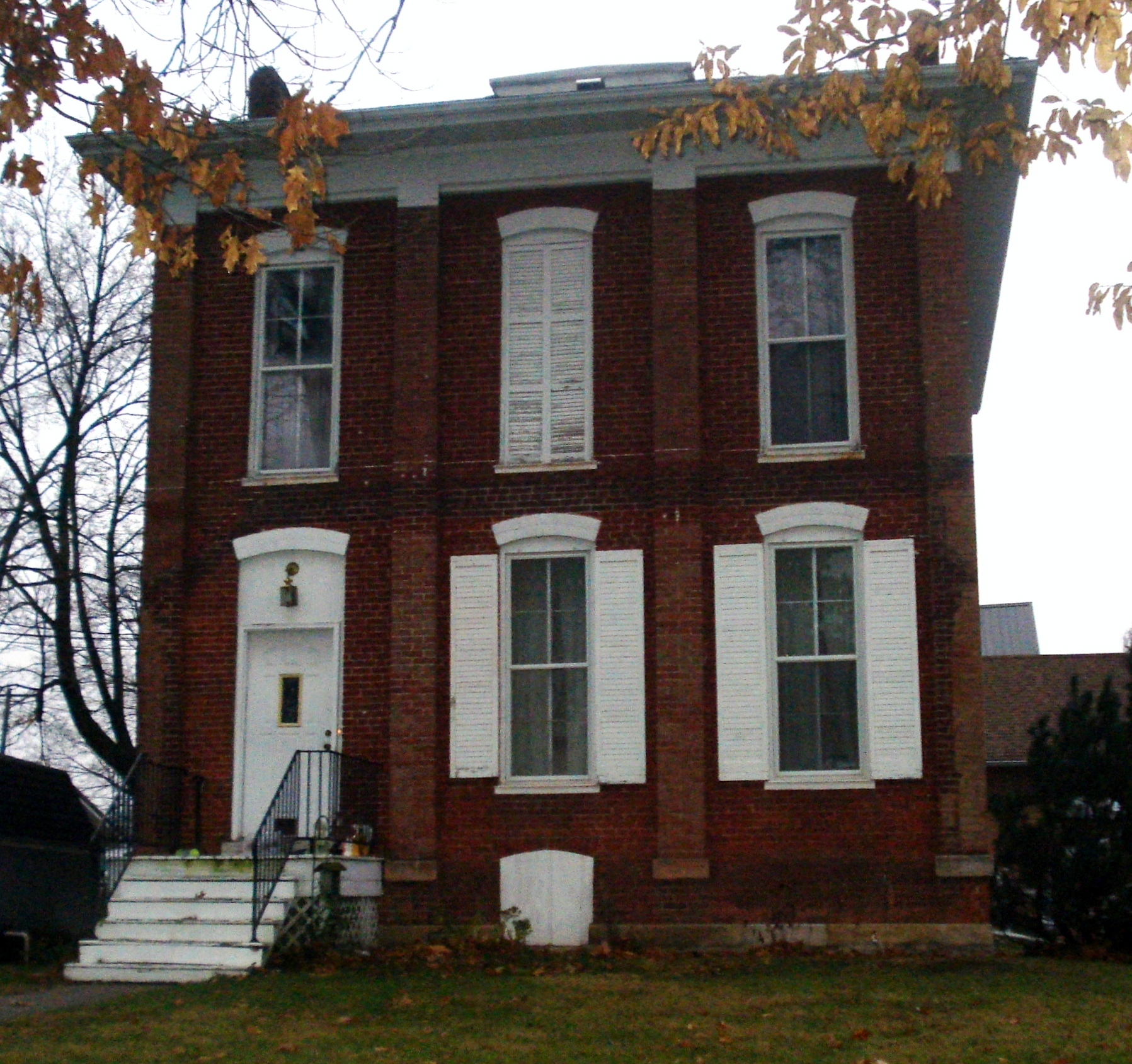

- Location within Iowa Location within the United States
- Location: 305 S. Ave. C Washington, Iowa
- Coordinates: 41°17′50″N 91°41′44″W
- Area: less than one acre
- Built: 1867–1869
- Built by: V.W. Andrus; M. Barratt
- Architectural style: Italianate
- NRHP reference No.: 77000564
- Added to NRHP: September 22, 1977

The Kurtz House, is a historic residence located in Washington, Iowa, United States. It was listed on the National Register of Historic Places in 1977. The house was begun by V.W. Andrus in 1867, and completed in 1869 by M. Barratt when Andrus ran out of money. J.F. Kurtz, for whom the house is named, lived here from 1919 to 1943. The two-story vernacular Italianate structure was built with locally made brick. It is capped with a hip roof and deck. Decorative details include wide eaves and a wood cornice that are supported by paired brackets. Brick pilasters separate the bays. A single-story addition was built onto the rear of the house, and the front porch has been removed.
