= Pilotburg Church =

- U.S. National Register of Historic Places
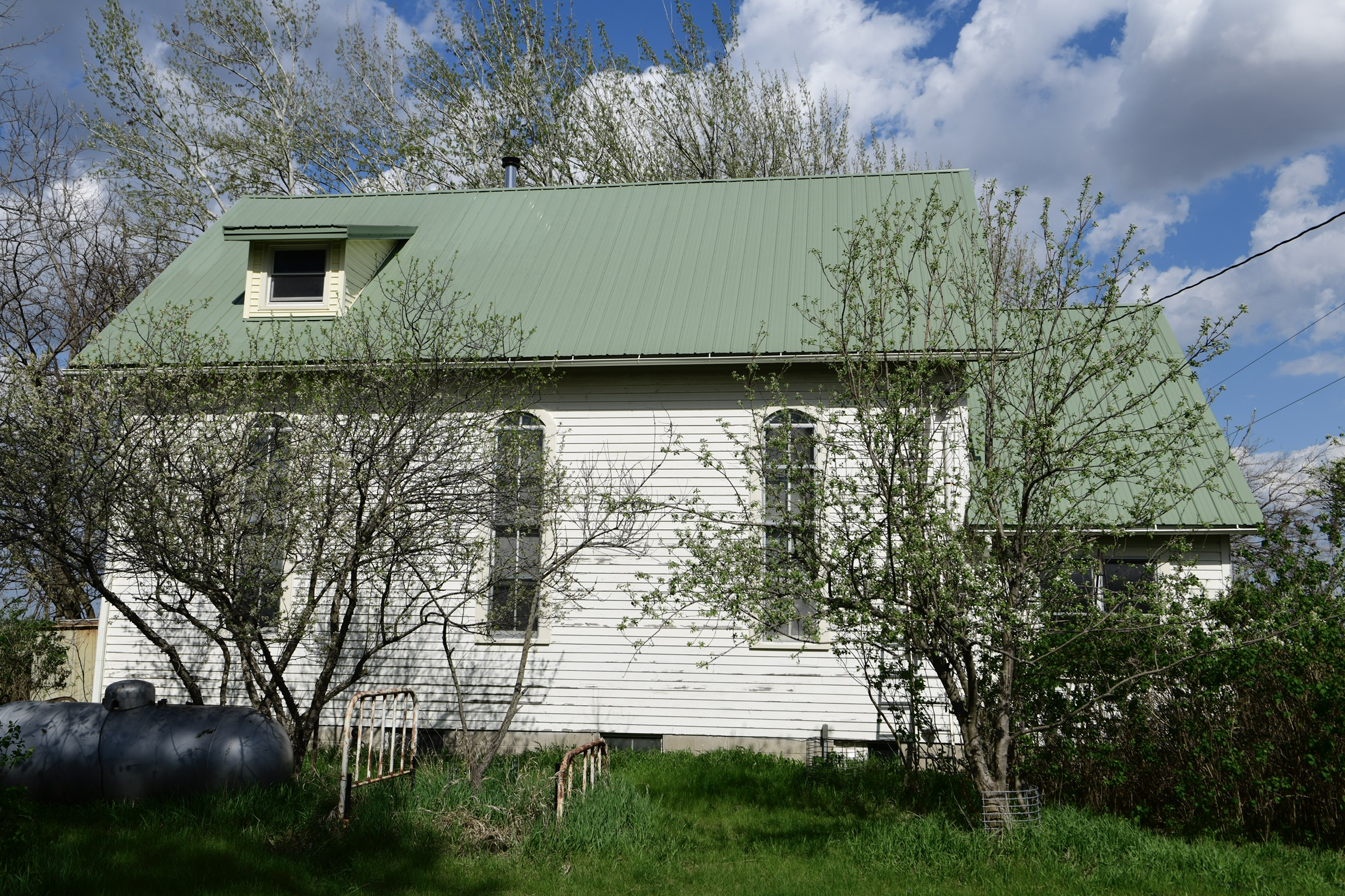
- The former Pilotburg Church

- Location within Iowa Location within the United States
- Location: 1874 155th St.
- Nearest city: Wellman, Iowa
- Coordinates: 41°26′4″N 91°46′36″W
- Area: less than one acre
- Built: 1881
- Architectural style: Late Victorian
- NRHP reference No.: 96000517
- Added to NRHP: May 2, 1996

Pilotburg Church is a historic church building southeast of the town of Wellman, Iowa, United States. It was listed on the National Register of Historic Places in 1996. The former church building is the only remaining structure from the town of Pilotburg, which had been established in 1839 as Pilots Grove. Built by the Methodist Episcopal Church in 1881, it was the second church in the town. The frame structure measures 50 by 20 feet (15.2 by 6.1 m). In the 1950s the church was moved from its original limestone foundation, still extant, to a poured/concrete block basement. A kitchen was added inside at the same time. The Methodist congregation disbanded in 1968, and the church was sold and converted into a house.
