= Washington, Iowa =

- City
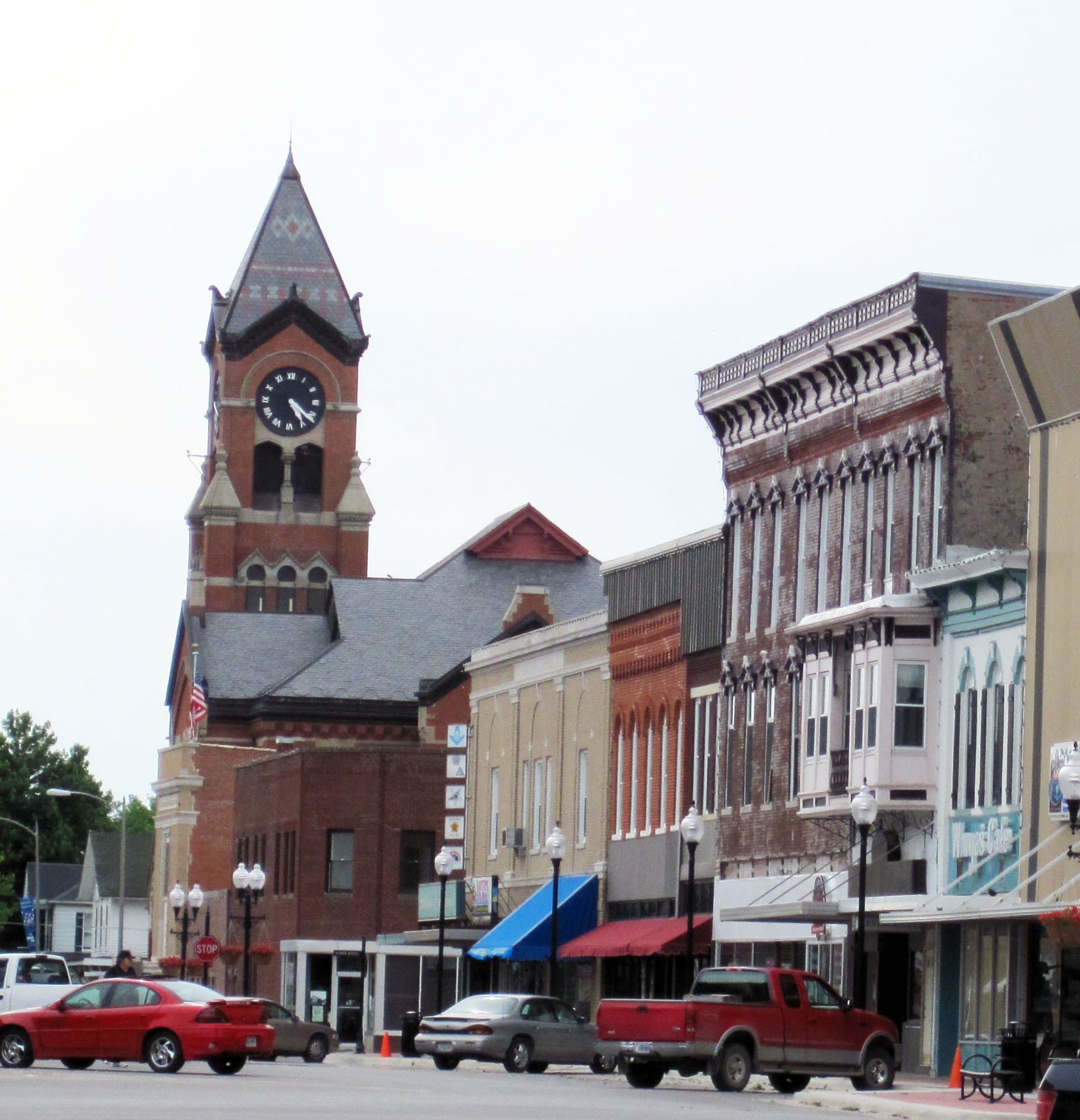
- The north side of the Washington Square with the Courthouse in the background.

- Nicknames: City of Flowers and Trees
- Motto: Onward! To the Salt Mines!
- Location of Washington, Iowa
- Coordinates: 41°17′53″N 91°41′35″W
- Country: United States
- State: Iowa
- County: Washington

Government
  - Mayor: Millie Youngquist

Area
  - Total: 5.34 sq mi (13.82 km^{2})
  - Land: 5.34 sq mi (13.82 km^{2})
  - Water: 0.0039 sq mi (0.01 km^{2})
- Elevation: 758 ft (231 m)

Population (2020)
  - Total: 7,352
  - Density: 1,378.3/sq mi (532.15/km^{2})
- Time zone: UTC-6 (Central (CST))
  - Summer (DST): UTC-5 (CDT)
- ZIP code: 52353
- Area code: 319
- FIPS code: 19-82335
- GNIS feature ID: 2397207
- Website: washingtoniowa.gov

Washington is a city in and the county seat of Washington County, Iowa, United States. It is part of the Iowa City metropolitan area. The population was 7,352 at the time of the 2020 census.

== History ==
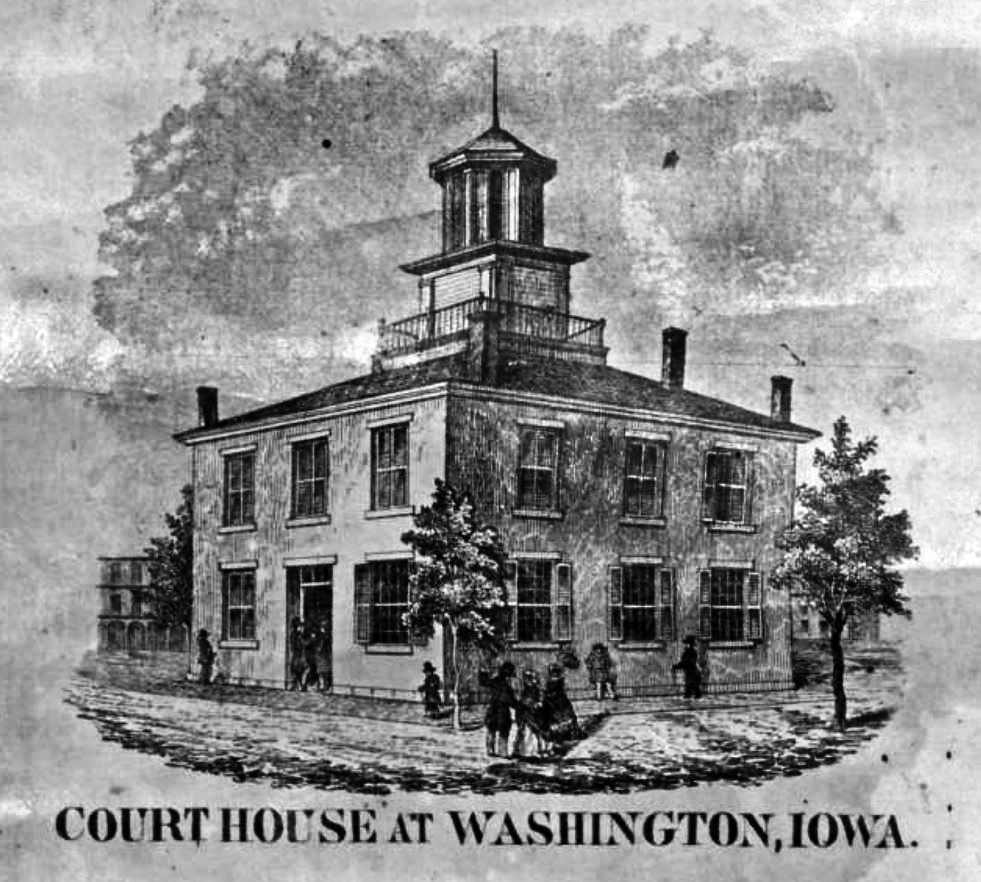
1858 drawing of the Washington County Courthouse

Washington was founded in 1839 as the county seat of the newly established Washington County. In 1854 it became the home of a United Presbyterian College, which was dissolved in 1864. As of 2014, the town has celebrated its 175th anniversary, only 5 years behind the oldest city in Iowa, Dubuque, Iowa.

In 2016, the Guinness World Book of Records certified the State Theatre in Washington, Iowa, as the "world's oldest continually operating cinema theatre".

== Geography ==
According to the United States Census Bureau, the city has a total area of 4.92 square miles (12.74 km^{2}), all land.

=== Climate ===
Climate data for Washington, Iowa, 1991–2020 normals, extremes 1893–present
| Month | Jan | Feb | Mar | Apr | May | Jun | Jul | Aug | Sep | Oct | Nov | Dec | Year |
|---|---|---|---|---|---|---|---|---|---|---|---|---|---|
| Record high °F (°C) | 70 (21) | 76 (24) | 89 (32) | 94 (34) | 103 (39) | 107 (42) | 113 (45) | 109 (43) | 102 (39) | 96 (36) | 82 (28) | 74 (23) | 113 (45) |
| Mean maximum °F (°C) | 53.3 (11.8) | 58.3 (14.6) | 72.7 (22.6) | 82.0 (27.8) | 87.9 (31.1) | 92.6 (33.7) | 94.9 (34.9) | 94.0 (34.4) | 91.2 (32.9) | 83.8 (28.8) | 70.4 (21.3) | 57.6 (14.2) | 96.8 (36.0) |
| Mean daily maximum °F (°C) | 30.2 (−1.0) | 35.0 (1.7) | 48.3 (9.1) | 62.0 (16.7) | 72.2 (22.3) | 81.4 (27.4) | 85.0 (29.4) | 83.3 (28.5) | 77.3 (25.2) | 64.2 (17.9) | 48.7 (9.3) | 35.6 (2.0) | 60.3 (15.7) |
| Daily mean °F (°C) | 20.8 (−6.2) | 25.1 (−3.8) | 37.4 (3.0) | 49.7 (9.8) | 60.9 (16.1) | 70.6 (21.4) | 74.1 (23.4) | 72.0 (22.2) | 64.3 (17.9) | 52.0 (11.1) | 38.2 (3.4) | 26.7 (−2.9) | 49.3 (9.6) |
| Mean daily minimum °F (°C) | 11.5 (−11.4) | 15.3 (−9.3) | 26.5 (−3.1) | 37.5 (3.1) | 49.7 (9.8) | 59.8 (15.4) | 63.1 (17.3) | 60.7 (15.9) | 51.4 (10.8) | 39.9 (4.4) | 27.7 (−2.4) | 17.9 (−7.8) | 38.4 (3.6) |
| Mean minimum °F (°C) | −10.7 (−23.7) | −4.6 (−20.3) | 6.3 (−14.3) | 23.2 (−4.9) | 35.0 (1.7) | 47.7 (8.7) | 52.8 (11.6) | 50.2 (10.1) | 37.3 (2.9) | 24.7 (−4.1) | 12.1 (−11.1) | −2.1 (−18.9) | −14.8 (−26.0) |
| Record low °F (°C) | −32 (−36) | −29 (−34) | −16 (−27) | 7 (−14) | 23 (−5) | 35 (2) | 45 (7) | 39 (4) | 23 (−5) | 6 (−14) | −7 (−22) | −25 (−32) | −32 (−36) |
| Average precipitation inches (mm) | 1.25 (32) | 1.56 (40) | 2.32 (59) | 3.65 (93) | 5.11 (130) | 5.17 (131) | 4.13 (105) | 4.18 (106) | 3.60 (91) | 3.03 (77) | 2.23 (57) | 1.71 (43) | 37.94 (964) |
| Average snowfall inches (cm) | 7.5 (19) | 8.1 (21) | 2.3 (5.8) | 0.8 (2.0) | 0.0 (0.0) | 0.0 (0.0) | 0.0 (0.0) | 0.0 (0.0) | 0.0 (0.0) | 0.4 (1.0) | 1.4 (3.6) | 4.7 (12) | 25.2 (64.4) |
| Average precipitation days (≥ 0.01 in) | 7.7 | 7.3 | 8.2 | 10.2 | 12.5 | 12.2 | 9.0 | 9.2 | 7.9 | 8.8 | 7.7 | 7.8 | 108.5 |
| Average snowy days (≥ 0.1 in) | 4.8 | 4.2 | 1.5 | 0.4 | 0.0 | 0.0 | 0.0 | 0.0 | 0.0 | 0.1 | 0.8 | 3.7 | 15.5 |
Source 1: NOAA
Source 2: National Weather Service

== Demographics ==
Historical populations
| Year | Pop. | ±% |
|---|---|---|
| 1870 | 2,575 | — |
| 1880 | 2,949 | +14.5% |
| 1890 | 3,235 | +9.7% |
| 1900 | 4,255 | +31.5% |
| 1910 | 4,380 | +2.9% |
| 1920 | 4,697 | +7.2% |
| 1930 | 4,814 | +2.5% |
| 1940 | 5,227 | +8.6% |
| 1950 | 5,902 | +12.9% |
| 1960 | 6,037 | +2.3% |
| 1970 | 6,317 | +4.6% |
| 1980 | 6,584 | +4.2% |
| 1990 | 7,074 | +7.4% |
| 2000 | 7,047 | −0.4% |
| 2010 | 7,266 | +3.1% |
| 2020 | 7,352 | +1.2% |
Source:"U.S. Census website". United States Census Bureau. and Iowa Data Center; Source: U.S. Decennial Census

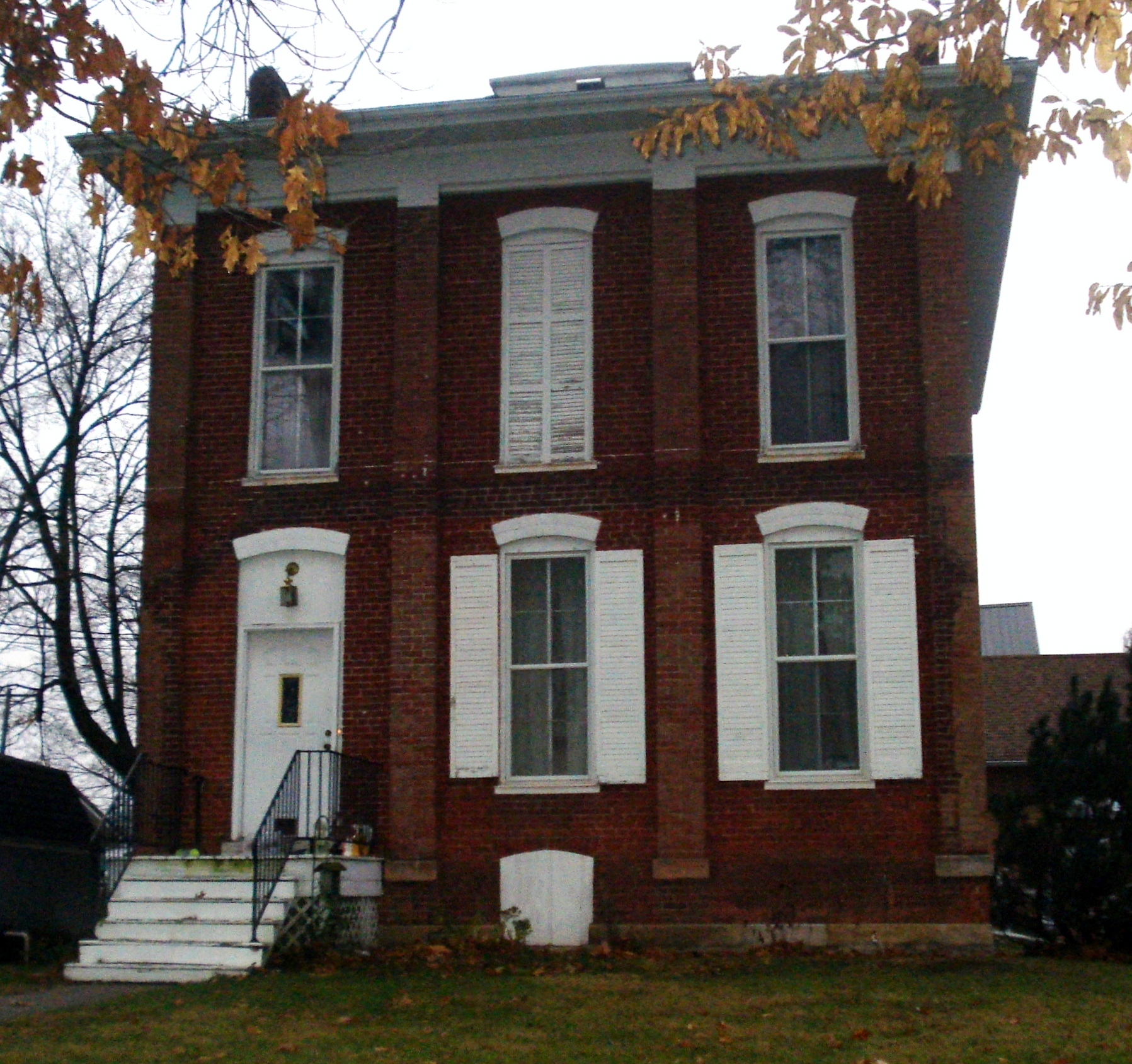
Kurtz House listed on the National Register of Historic Places

=== 2020 census ===
As of the 2020 census, Washington had a population of 7,352 people, with 1,840 families residing in the city. The population density was 1,397.1 inhabitants per square mile (539.4/km^{2}).

The median age was 40.7 years. 23.4% of residents were under the age of 18. 25.9% of residents were under the age of 20, 5.2% were from 20 to 24, 22.7% were from 25 to 44, 22.6% were from 45 to 64, and 23.5% were 65 years of age or older. The gender makeup of the city was 47.5% male and 52.5% female. For every 100 females there were 90.6 males, and for every 100 females age 18 and over there were 86.6 males age 18 and over.

93.0% of residents lived in urban areas, while 7.0% lived in rural areas.

Of the 3,071 households, 28.8% had children under the age of 18 living in them. Of all households, 43.1% were married-couple households, 7.5% were cohabiting-couple households, 19.2% had a male householder with no spouse or partner present, and 30.2% had a female householder with no spouse or partner present. 40.1% of all households were non-families. 34.5% of all households were made up of individuals, and 18.4% had someone living alone who was 65 years of age or older.

There were 3,280 housing units at an average density of 623.3 per square mile (240.7/km^{2}). Of all housing units, 6.4% were vacant. The homeowner vacancy rate was 2.5% and the rental vacancy rate was 6.3%.

Racial composition as of the 2020 census
| Race | Number | Percent |
|---|---|---|
| White | 6,180 | 84.1% |
| Black or African American | 95 | 1.3% |
| American Indian and Alaska Native | 39 | 0.5% |
| Asian | 78 | 1.1% |
| Native Hawaiian and Other Pacific Islander | 2 | 0.0% |
| Some other race | 495 | 6.7% |
| Two or more races | 463 | 6.3% |
| Hispanic or Latino (of any race) | 1,012 | 13.8% |

=== 2010 census ===
As of the census of 2010, there were 7,266 people, 3,048 households, and 1,861 families living in the city. The population density was 1,476.8 inhabitants per square mile (570.2/km^{2}). There were 3,301 housing units at an average density of 670.9 per square mile (259.0/km^{2}). The racial makeup of the city was 92.5% White, 1.4% African American, 0.2% Native American, 0.5% Asian, 0.2% Pacific Islander, 2.7% from other races, and 2.6% from two or more races. Hispanic or Latino of any race were 10.7% of the population.

There were 3,048 households, of which 29.4% had children under the age of 18 living with them, 46.5% were married couples living together, 10.2% had a female householder with no husband present, 4.3% had a male householder with no wife present, and 38.9% were non-families. 33.8% of all households were made up of individuals, and 16.6% had someone living alone who was 65 years of age or older. The average household size was 2.31 and the average family size was 2.93.

The median age in the city was 42.4 years. 23.8% of residents were under the age of 18; 7.1% were between the ages of 18 and 24; 22.1% were from 25 to 44; 25.9% were from 45 to 64; and 21.1% were 65 years of age or older. The gender makeup of the city was 48.1% male and 51.9% female.

=== 2000 census ===
As of the census of 2000, there were 7,047 people, 2,928 households, and 1,903 families living in the city. The population density was 1,454.3 inhabitants per square mile (561.5/km^{2}). There were 3,132 housing units at an average density of 646.3 per square mile (249.5/km^{2}). The racial makeup of the city was 95.20% White, 0.57% African American, 0.11% Native American, 0.35% Asian, 0.04% Pacific Islander, 2.72% from other races, and 0.99% from two or more races. Hispanic or Latino of any race were 4.71% of the population.

There were 2,928 households, out of which 27.7% had children under the age of 18 living with them, 53.8% were married couples living together, 8.6% had a female householder with no husband present, and 35.0% were non-families. 30.9% of all households were made up of individuals, and 16.7% had someone living alone who was 65 years of age or older. The average household size was 2.31 and the average family size was 2.88.

Age spread: 22.8% under the age of 18, 7.2% from 18 to 24, 24.9% from 25 to 44, 21.6% from 45 to 64, and 23.5% who were 65 years of age or older. The median age was 42 years. For every 100 females, there were 85.1 males. For every 100 females age 18 and over, there were 82.8 males.

The median income for a household in the city was $36,067, and the median income for a family was $44,497. Males had a median income of $29,961 versus $20,706 for females. The per capita income for the city was $18,145. About 5.4% of families and 9.3% of the population were below the poverty line, including 16.3% of those under age 18 and 5.7% of those age 65 or over.

== Government ==
Washington is governed by a six-member city council headed by a mayor. The mayor and council members are elected for four-year terms. The city council consists of four ward counselors and two at-large members. As of August 2023, the mayor is Jaron Rosien and council members are Bethany Glinsmann (1st Ward), Ivan Rangel (Ward 2), Illa Earnest (Ward 3), Fran Stigers (Ward 4), Elaine Moore (at-large), and Millie Youngquist (at-large).

== Education ==
The Washington Community School District operates local schools, including Washington High School.

== Notable people ==
- Harry W. Bolens, Wisconsin State Senator
- Smith Wildman Brookhart, United States Senator
- Eva Carter Buckner, poet, suffragist, songwriter
- Charles Almon Dewey, United States federal judge
- Matt Fish, basketball player
- Owen Gingerich, astronomer
- Mike Hennigan, NFL player and coach
- Pierce Knox, blind xylophonist
- John F. McJunkin, Iowa state senator
- Keith Molesworth, basketball player and coach
- Pam Roth, Illinois state representative
- John M. Work, Socialist and newspaper editor

== See also ==
- Saving Brinton
