= 1999 McDonald's All-American Boys Game =

American high school basketball game

West	East
141	128
	1st half	2nd half	Total
West	68	73	141
East	58	70	128
- Date: March 24, 1999
- Venue: Hilton Coliseum, Ames, IA
- MVP: Jonathan Bender
- Referees: 1; 2; 3
- Attendance: 10,993
- Network: ESPN

McDonald's All-American

The 1999 McDonald's All-American Boys Game was an All-star basketball game played on Wednesday, March 24, 1999 at the Hilton Coliseum in Ames, Iowa. The game's rosters featured the best and most highly recruited high school boys graduating in 1999. The game was the 22nd annual version of the McDonald's All-American Game first played in 1978.

== 1999 game ==
The game was telecast live by ESPN. During the halftime break, the jersey number 23 was retired in honor of Michael Jordan. Casey Jacobsen was the last player to wear 23 during a McDonald's All-American Game. The 1999 game saw several records: it was the highest scoring game in the event history, and Jonathan Bender broke Jordan's record of 30 points by scoring 31, 18 of which in the first half. Bender also had 10 rebounds, recording a double-double. Other players that starred were Carlos Boozer and Casey Jacobsen, who scored 22 points each; Jason Williams, who scored 20 points; DerMarr Johnson, who scored 19; and Marvin Stone, who recorded 13 points and 10 rebounds. Of the 21 players, 15 went on to play at least 1 game in the NBA. The dominant performance convinced Bender to skip college, despite having committed to play for Mississippi State, and declare for the 1999 NBA draft: he was drafted out of high school with the 5th overall pick.

=== East roster ===
No.	Name	Height	Weight	Position	Hometown	High school	College of Choice
10	Keith Bogans	6-4	210	F	Hyattsville, MD, U.S.	DeMatha	Kentucky
11	Kenny Satterfield	6-3	185	G	Manhattan, NY, U.S.	Rice	Cincinnati
14	Majestic Mapp	6-1	185	G	Bronx, NY, U.S.	St. Raymond	Virginia
20	Marvin Stone	6-10	240	C	Huntsville, AL, U.S.	Grissom	Kentucky
21	Damien Wilkins	6-7	225	F	Orlando, FL, U.S.	Dr. Phillips	NC State
22	Casey Sanders	6-11	235	C	Tampa, FL, U.S.	Tampa Preparatory	Duke
32	Jason Williams	6-2	195	G	Metuchen, NJ, U.S.	St. Joseph	Duke
33	DerMarr Johnson	6-9	201	F	Pittsfield, ME, U.S.	Maine Central Institute	Undecided; Committed later to Cincinnati.
34	Donnell Harvey	6-7	220	F	Cuthbert, GA, U.S.	Randolph Clay	Undecided; Committed later to Florida.
40	Joseph Forte	6-3	190	G	Hyattsville, MD, U.S.	DeMatha	North Carolina

=== West roster ===
No.	Name	Height	Weight	Position	Hometown	High school	College of Choice
4	Carlos Boozer, Jr.	6-7	245	F	Juneau, AK, U.S.	Juneau-Douglas	Undecided; Committed later to Duke.
10	Brett Nelson	6-3	180	G	St. Albans, WV, U.S.	Saint Albans	Florida
20	Jason Kapono	6-7	210	G	Lakewood, CA, U.S.	Artesia	Undecided; Committed later to UCLA.
22	Jason Gardner	5-11	190	G	Indianapolis, IN, U.S.	North Central	Arizona
23	Casey Jacobsen	6-9	215	F	Glendora, CA, U.S.	Glendora	Stanford
24	Jonathan Bender	6-11	205	C	Picayune, MS, U.S.	Picayune Memorial	Mississippi State (Did not attend)
34	Brian Cook	6-11	235	C	Lincoln, IL, U.S.	Lincoln Community	Illinois
35	Michael Dunleavy, Jr.	6-7	220	F	Portland, OR, U.S.	Jesuit	Duke
44	Nick Collison	6-9	255	F	Iowa Falls, IA, U.S.	Iowa Falls	Kansas
N/A	LaVell Blanchard	6-7	215	F	Ann Arbor, MI, U.S.	Pioneer	Undecided; Committed later to Michigan.
N/A	Jason Richardson	6-6	220	G	Saginaw, MI, U.S.	Arthur Hill	Michigan State

=== Coaches ===
The East team was coached by:

- Head Coach William Fox, Jr. of Father Judge High School (Philadelphia, Pennsylvania)
- Asst Coach Bill Koch of Father Judge High School (Philadelphia, Pennsylvania)

The West team was coached by:

- Head Coach Don Showalter of Mid-Prairie High School (Wellman, Iowa)
- Asst Coach Chris Kern of Mid-Prairie High School (Wellman, Iowa)

== All-American Week ==
=== Contest winners ===
- The 1999 Slam Dunk contest was won by Donnell Harvey.
- The 1999 3-point shoot-out was won by Jason Kapono.
