= Grasshorse Studios =

American animation studio (2002–2023)

- Founded: 2002
- Founder: Steve Jennings
- Defunct: July 31, 2023; 2 years ago
- Headquarters: Winfield, Iowa, United States
- Key people: Steve Jennings -- Director; Sabrina Claman -- Director
- Owners: Steve Jennings; Kathy Buxton; Karen McGuiness
- Website: Grasshorse.com

Grasshorse Studios was a Midwest-based American animation studio that employed innovative techniques to develop and produce 2D animation, 3D animation, stop motion animation, 2D 3D hybrid animation. They have produced work for 20th Century Fox, Walt Disney Television Animation and Cartoon Network.

== History ==
In 2002, Grasshorse began as a sole proprietorship with Jennings working on shows including Craig McCracken’s The Powerpuff Girls for Cartoon Network, Warner Bros.' Johnny Test, Genndy Tartakovsky’s Star Wars: Clone Wars and Megas XLR. Jennings pioneered 2D 3D hybrid animation techniques on The Powerpuff Girls; he was one of the first to mash the aesthetics of 2D animation with 3D animation in broadcast television.

In 2007, the studio was relocated to Iowa by siblings Kathy Buxton and Steve Jennings and expanded with the goal of competing with international studios in quality and budget. Soon after, Grasshorse partnered with Southeastern Community College (Iowa) in creating a Character animation program. After three years in the writing and planning of the curriculum its first classes began in Fall, 2011. Jennings continues to serve on the board of SCC's animation program.

Grasshorse web-based virtual workshop was featured as "Website of the Month" in 3D World Magazine, August, 2006

Grasshorse was a recipient of the demonstration fund award from the state of Iowa in 2008.

Grasshorse has continued developing techniques to blend multiple styles; in blending 2D and 3D animation, Grasshorse often uses orthographic cameras to eliminate 3D perspective, making the animation appear flatter. The effect is further emphasized through limiting the angles in which 3D models can be displayed to reinforce a 2D-like aesthetic.

Grasshorse defunct on July 31, 2023.

== Work ==
- Powerpuff Girls
- Star Wars: Clone Wars
- How to Eat Fried Worms (film)
- Johnny Test
- Megas XLR
- Maze Runner (film series): Scorch Trials, Flare Virus Explained
- Hitman: Agent 47 homage to Mad Men
- The Sacrifice
- Jeep Treasure
- Red Water Watch
- "Roll Up" - Fitz and the Tantrums (album)

== Awards ==
- Dragon Con Independent Film Festival, "The Sacrifice"—Best Animated Short-Short
- Wild Rose Film Festival, "The Sacrifice"—Best Animated Film
- 30+ American Advertising Awards awarded by the American Advertising Federation 2008-2016
- 5 Bronze Telly Awards, 2013
