= Keota, Iowa =

- City
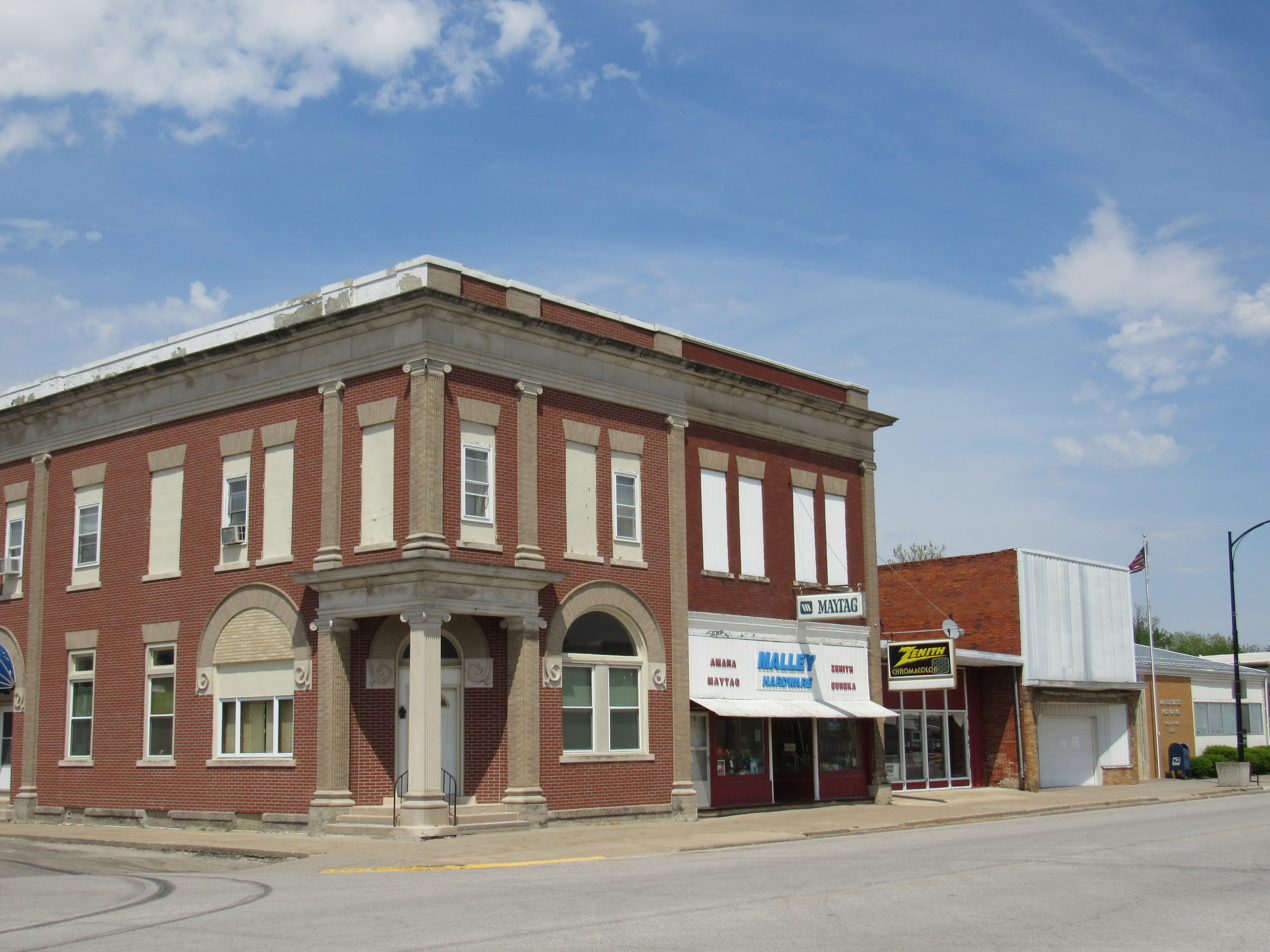
- Downtown Keota
- Nickname: Golden Buckle on the Corn Belt
- Location of Keota, Iowa
- Coordinates: 41°21′54″N 91°57′12″W
- Country: United States
- State: Iowa
- Counties: Keokuk, Washington
- Townships: Lafayette, Seventy-Six

Government
  - Mayor: Ryan Carr

Area
  - Total: 0.77 sq mi (2.00 km^{2})
  - Land: 0.77 sq mi (2.00 km^{2})
  - Water: 0 sq mi (0.00 km^{2})
- Elevation: 801 ft (244 m)

Population (2020)
  - Total: 897
  - Density: 1,159.9/sq mi (447.84/km^{2})
- Time zone: UTC-6 (Central (CST))
  - Summer (DST): UTC-5 (CDT)
- ZIP code: 52248
- Area code: 641
- FIPS code: 19-40980
- GNIS feature ID: 2395518
- Website: www.keotaiowa.org

Keota is a city in Keokuk and Washington counties, Iowa, United States. The population was 897 at the time of the 2020 census.

== History ==
Keota is derived from an Indian name meaning "gone to visit" or "the fire is gone out".

=== 2010 fire ===
A large part of historic downtown Keota was damaged by a fire on December 4, 2010. Five buildings on East Broadway were badly damaged or destroyed.

=== 2023 tornado ===
An EF4 tornado struck the northwest edge of Keota on the afternoon of March 31, 2023, causing extensive damage to numerous farms just outside of the city. Volunteers helped to clean up the debris in recovery efforts following the tornado.

== Geography ==
Keota is located in eastern Keokuk County and the city limits extend east into Washington County to encompass a golf course(Lagos Acres). The city is 15 miles (24 km) east of Sigourney, the Keokuk county seat, and 17 miles (27 km) northwest of Washington.

According to the United States Census Bureau, Keota has a total area of 0.63 square miles (1.63 km^{2}), all land.

== Demographics ==
Historical populations
Year	Pop.	±%
1880	710	—
1890	777	+9.4%
1900	996	+28.2%
1910	988	−0.8%
1920	1,025	+3.7%
1930	955	−6.8%
1940	1,032	+8.1%
1950	1,145	+10.9%
1960	1,096	−4.3%
1970	1,112	+1.5%
1980	1,034	−7.0%
1990	1,000	−3.3%
2000	1,025	+2.5%
2010	1,009	−1.6%
2020	897	−11.1%
Source:"American FactFinder". United States Census Bureau. and Iowa Data Center; Source: U.S. Decennial Census

=== 2020 census ===
As of the census of 2020, there were 897 people, 384 households, and 239 families residing in the city. The population density was 1,159.9 inhabitants per square mile (447.8/km^{2}). There were 422 housing units at an average density of 545.7 per square mile (210.7/km^{2}). The racial makeup of the city was 94.9% White, 0.9% Black or African American, 0.1% Native American, 0.0% Asian, 0.0% Pacific Islander, 0.7% from other races and 3.5% from two or more races. Hispanic or Latino persons of any race comprised 3.2% of the population.

Of the 384 households, 30.7% of which had children under the age of 18 living with them, 45.1% were married couples living together, 6.2% were cohabitating couples, 27.6% had a female householder with no spouse or partner present and 21.1% had a male householder with no spouse or partner present. 37.8% of all households were non-families. 33.3% of all households were made up of individuals, 17.7% had someone living alone who was 65 years old or older.

The median age in the city was 42.4 years. 27.6% of the residents were under the age of 20; 4.3% were between the ages of 20 and 24; 21.4% were from 25 and 44; 25.4% were from 45 and 64; and 21.2% were 65 years of age or older. The gender makeup of the city was 49.4% male and 50.6% female.

=== 2010 census ===
As of the census of 2010, there were 1,009 people, 408 households, and 269 families living in the city. The population density was 1,601.6 inhabitants per square mile (618.4/km^{2}). There were 443 housing units at an average density of 703.2 per square mile (271.5/km^{2}). The racial makeup of the city was 98.3% White, 0.4% African American, 0.2% Asian, and 1.1% from two or more races. Hispanic or Latino of any race were 0.2% of the population.

There were 408 households, of which 32.4% had children under the age of 18 living with them, 50.7% were married couples living together, 10.5% had a female householder with no husband present, 4.7% had a male householder with no wife present, and 34.1% were non-families. 30.9% of all households were made up of individuals, and 13.9% had someone living alone who was 65 years of age or older. The average household size was 2.40 and the average family size was 2.95.

The median age in the city was 40.5 years. 26.4% of residents were under the age of 18; 5.4% were between the ages of 18 and 24; 22.5% were from 25 to 44; 28.3% were from 45 to 64; and 17.3% were 65 years of age or older. The gender makeup of the city was 49.7% male and 50.3% female.

=== 2000 census ===
As of the census of 2000, there were 1,025 people, 430 households, and 258 families living in the city. The population density was 1,636.9 inhabitants per square mile (632.0/km^{2}). There were 466 housing units at an average density of 744.2 per square mile (287.3/km^{2}). The racial makeup of the city was 98.73% White, 0.29% Native American, 0.49% Asian, 0.39% from other races, and 0.10% from two or more races. Hispanic or Latino of any race were 0.59% of the population.

There were 430 households, out of which 27.7% had children under the age of 18 living with them, 49.1% were married couples living together, 6.7% had a female householder with no husband present, and 39.8% were non-families. 35.6% of all households were made up of individuals, and 21.6% had someone living alone who was 65 years of age or older. The average household size was 2.28 and the average family size was 2.98.

In the city, the population was spread out, with 23.3% under the age of 18, 7.5% from 18 to 24, 25.3% from 25 to 44, 19.9% from 45 to 64, and 24.0% who were 65 years of age or older. The median age was 41 years. For every 100 females, there were 86.0 males. For every 100 females age 18 and over, there were 84.9 males.

The median income for a household in the city was $35,966, and the median income for a family was $43,393. Males had a median income of $30,481 versus $24,479 for females. The per capita income for the city was $17,310. About 7.6% of families and 8.8% of the population were below the poverty line, including 11.7% of those under age 18 and 7.7% of those age 65 or over.

== Education ==
Keota is home to Keota Community School District, that serves for the education of kindergarten through 12th grade. Their mascot is the eagle. Their school colors are purple and gold.

== Notable people ==
- Earl W. Vincent (1886–1953), U.S. representative from Iowa
