= Verdi, Iowa =

- Unincorporated community
- Location within Iowa
- Coordinates: 41°14′10″N 91°46′46″W
- Country: United States
- State: Iowa
- County: Washington
- Elevation: 673 ft (205 m)
- Time zone: UTC-6 (Central (CST))
  - Summer (DST): UTC-5 (CDT)
- Area code: 319
- GNIS feature ID: 1981637

Verdi is an unincorporated community in Washington County, Iowa, United States. It was located on the Chicago, Rock Island, and Pacific Railroad in the northern part of Brighton Township.

== Geography ==
Verdi was near the junction of Iowa Highway 1 and 290th Street.

It was on the Chicago, Rock Island, and Pacific (C.R.I.& P) Railroad, about 7 miles (11 km) southwest of Washington.

== History ==
Verdi was established in Section 4 of Brighton Township, north of Brighton, on the Chicago, Rock Island, and Pacific Railroad. The name Verdi honored the Italian composer; the community had previously been known as McCoid, and then McJunkin.

Verdi's population was 14 in 1900, 21 in 1917, and 27 in 1925. Its post office closed in 1915.

In the 1930s, the Davenport Democrat and Leader reported that only older people would remember when Verdi, along with Grace Hill, Rubio, Dublin, Richmond, and other Washington County towns were still prominent.

By 1940, Verdi's population had dropped to 5. By 1956, Verdi was considered an "extinct town".

== See also ==
- Rubio, Iowa
