= Harry Stinson =

Harry Stinson may refer to:

- Harry Stinson (musician), American drummer
- Harry Stinson (real estate developer), Canadian real estate developer
- Harry Edward Stinson, American sculptor
