= Cam Buffington =

American football player (born 2005)

No. 33 – Iowa Hawkeyes
- Position: Linebacker
- Class: Junior

Personal information
- Born: June 16, 2005 (age 21)
- Listed height: 6 ft 3 in (1.91 m)
- Listed weight: 238 lb (108 kg)

Career information
- High school: Winfield–Mt. Union (Winfield, Iowa)
- College: Iowa (2024–present)
- Stats at ESPN

Cam Buffington (born June 16, 2005) is an American college football linebacker for the Iowa Hawkeyes.

== Early life ==
Buffington attended Winfield–Mt. Union High School in Winfield, Iowa, where he played eight-man football as a linebacker and running back. As a junior, he had 1,484 rushing yards, 264 receiving yards, 34 touchdowns and 96 tackles and as a senior had 1,362 rushing yards, 613 receiving yards, 36 touchdowns and 107 tackles. Buffington committed to the University of Iowa to play college football.

== College career ==
After not appearing in any games his first year at Iowa in 2024, Buffington played in six games in 2025, recording seven tackles and one interception. He took over as a starting linebacker in 2026.
