= Winfield, Iowa =

- City
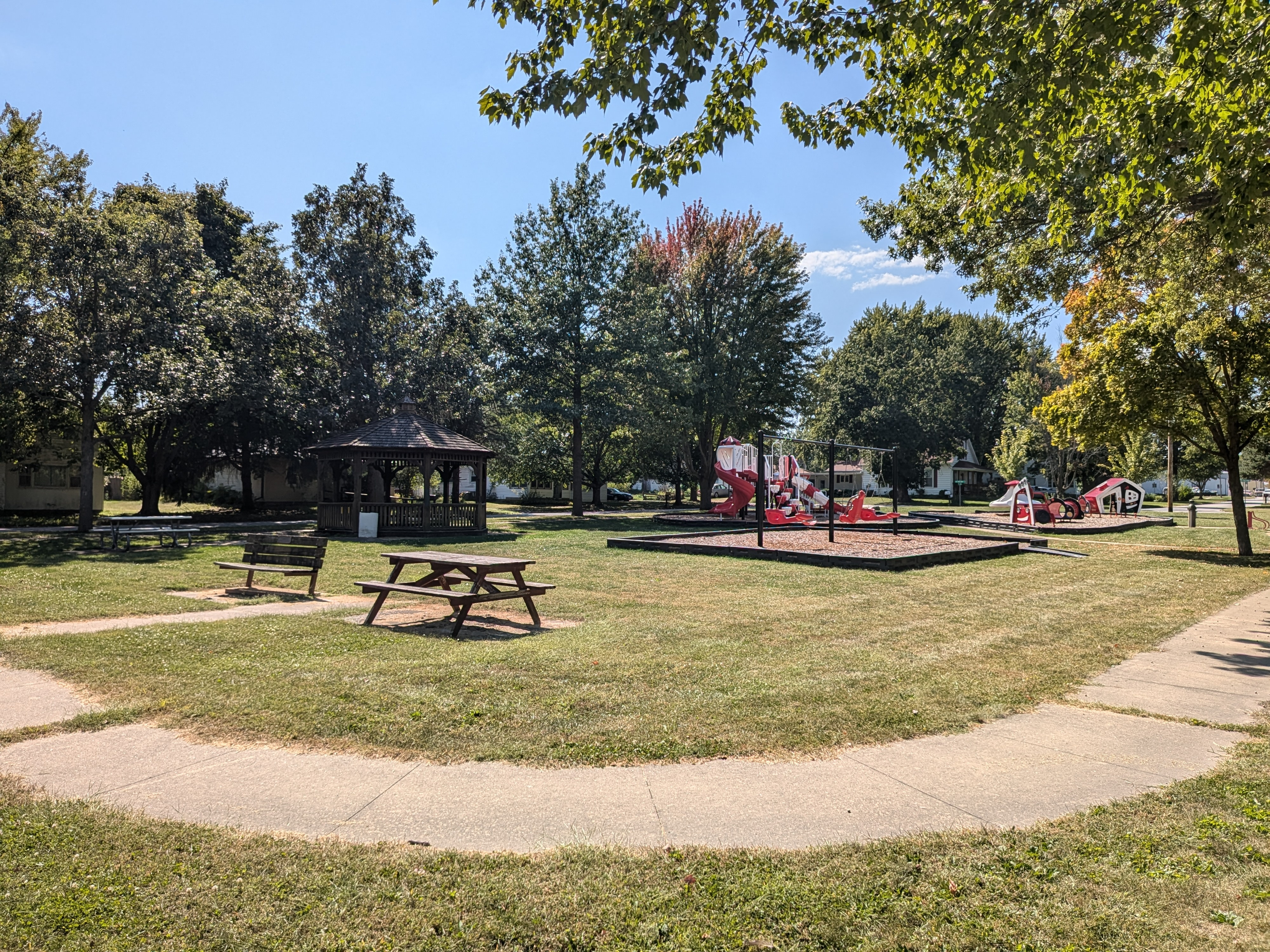
- A city park in Winfield

- Location of Winfield, Iowa
- Coordinates: 41°07′33″N 91°26′17″W
- Country: United States
- State: Iowa
- County: Henry

Area
  - Total: 1.04 sq mi (2.70 km^{2})
  - Land: 1.04 sq mi (2.70 km^{2})
  - Water: 0 sq mi (0.00 km^{2})
- Elevation: 722 ft (220 m)

Population (2020)
  - Total: 1,033
  - Density: 992.3/sq mi (383.14/km^{2})
- Time zone: UTC-6 (Central (CST))
  - Summer (DST): UTC-5 (CDT)
- ZIP code: 52659
- Area code: 319
- FIPS code: 19-86385
- GNIS feature ID: 2397344
- Website: http://www.winfieldiowa.com/

Winfield is a city in Henry County, Iowa, United States. The population was 1,033 at the time of the 2020 census.

== History ==
Winfield was laid out in 1852. It experienced a growth with the arrival of the Burlington and Northwestern Railway in late 1876, connecting the town with Burlington. The line was extended along the east side of town and reached Washington at the start of 1880, and in 1881, the Burlington and Western Railway was incorporated to build a line from Winfield to Oskaloosa. The new line branched from the Burlington and Northwestern just north of town reached Coppock the spring of 1882 and Oskaloosa in late 1883. These were 3 ft gauge railways.

In 1882, the Chicago, Burlington and Pacific constructed a rail line west from a railroad ferry crossing of the Mississippi River at Oakville, Iowa to Oskaloosa. This line passed Winfield along the south border of Winfield, and it largely paralleled the Burlington and Western to Oskaloosa, Iowa. The line was sold to the Central Iowa Railway as soon as it was built, and that line became the Iowa Central Railway a few years later.

Winfield was the hometown of the sports reporter Bill Bryson Sr.

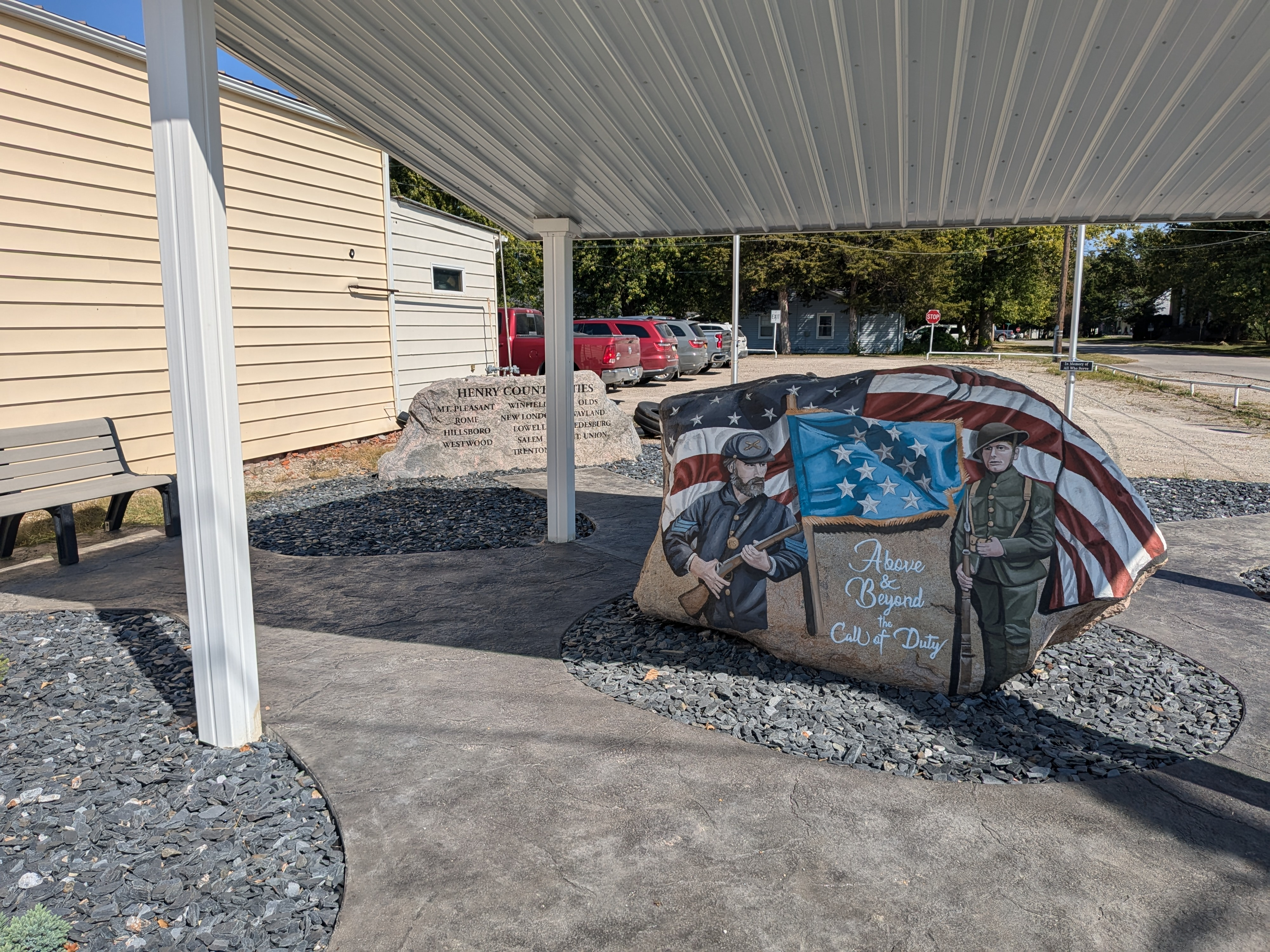
Winfield Freedom Rock

== Geography ==
Winfield is located in northeast Henry County just north of Iowa Highway 78. The East fork of Crooked Creek flows past just east of the city. Mount Pleasant is approximately 12 miles to the southwest.

According to the United States Census Bureau, the city has a total area of 1.05 square miles (2.72 km^{2}), all land.

== Demographics ==
Historical populations
Year	Pop.	±%
1890	461	—
1900	820	+77.9%
1910	934	+13.9%
1920	1,027	+10.0%
1930	933	−9.2%
1940	864	−7.4%
1950	888	+2.8%
1960	862	−2.9%
1970	897	+4.1%
1980	1,042	+16.2%
1990	1,051	+0.9%
2000	1,131	+7.6%
2010	1,134	+0.3%
2020	1,033	−8.9%
Source:"U.S. Census website". United States Census Bureau. and Iowa Data Center; Source: U.S. Decennial Census

=== 2020 census ===
As of the 2020 census, Winfield had a population of 1,033, with 415 households and 265 families residing in the city. The population density was 992.3 inhabitants per square mile (383.1/km^{2}). There were 457 housing units at an average density of 439.0 per square mile (169.5/km^{2}).

The median age was 40.0 years. 24.4% of residents were under the age of 18 and 19.9% were 65 years of age or older. 27.2% of residents were under the age of 20; 6.3% were between the ages of 20 and 24; 21.8% were from 25 to 44; and 24.8% were from 45 to 64. For every 100 females there were 89.2 males, and for every 100 females age 18 and over there were 85.5 males age 18 and over. The gender makeup of the city was 47.1% male and 52.9% female.

0.0% of residents lived in urban areas, while 100.0% lived in rural areas.

Of the 415 households, 33.0% had children under the age of 18 living in them. 45.3% were married couple households, 6.7% were cohabitating couples, 19.8% had a male householder with no spouse or partner present, and 28.2% had a female householder with no spouse or partner present. 36.1% of all households were non-families. About 32.3% of all households were made up of individuals, and 15.0% had someone living alone who was 65 years of age or older.

There were 457 housing units, of which 9.2% were vacant. The homeowner vacancy rate was 2.0% and the rental vacancy rate was 9.6%.

Racial composition as of the 2020 census
Race	Number	Percent
White	941	91.1%
Black or African American	5	0.5%
American Indian and Alaska Native	5	0.5%
Asian	4	0.4%
Native Hawaiian and Other Pacific Islander	0	0.0%
Some other race	17	1.6%
Two or more races	61	5.9%
Hispanic or Latino (of any race)	53	5.1%

=== 2010 census ===
As of the census of 2010, there were 1,134 people, 437 households, and 302 families living in the city. The population density was 1,080.0 inhabitants per square mile (417.0/km^{2}). There were 482 housing units at an average density of 459.0 per square mile (177.2/km^{2}). The racial makeup of the city was 96.8% White, 1.1% African American, 0.2% Native American, 0.5% Asian, 0.5% from other races, and 0.9% from two or more races. Hispanic or Latino of any race were 1.4% of the population.

There were 437 households, of which 35.5% had children under the age of 18 living with them, 49.4% were married couples living together, 14.6% had a female householder with no husband present, 5.0% had a male householder with no wife present, and 30.9% were non-families. 27.9% of all households were made up of individuals, and 11% had someone living alone who was 65 years of age or older. The average household size was 2.50 and the average family size was 3.02.

The median age in the city was 39.4 years. 27.2% of residents were under the age of 18; 7.2% were between the ages of 18 and 24; 23.4% were from 25 to 44; 24.2% were from 45 to 64; and 17.9% were 65 years of age or older. The gender makeup of the city was 49.3% male and 50.7% female.

=== 2000 census ===
As of the census of 2000, there were 1,131 people, 437 households, and 280 families living in the city. The population density was 1,089.7 inhabitants per square mile (420.7/km^{2}). There were 471 housing units at an average density of 453.8 per square mile (175.2/km^{2}). The racial makeup of the city was 97.97% White, 0.35% African American, 0.35% Asian, 0.80% from other races, and 0.53% from two or more races. Hispanic or Latino of any race were 1.50% of the population.

There were 437 households, out of which 35.0% had children under the age of 18 living with them, 52.4% were married couples living together, 8.0% had a female householder with no husband present, and 35.9% were non-families. 32.7% of all households were made up of individuals, and 19.2% had someone living alone who was 65 years of age or older. The average household size was 2.49 and the average family size was 3.18.

29.8% were under the age of 18, 5.7% from 18 to 24, 27.0% from 25 to 44, 17.8% from 45 to 64, and 19.8% were 65 years of age or older. The median age was 37 years. For every 100 females, there were 91.4 males. For every 100 females age 18 and over, there were 86.8 males.

The median income for a household in the city was $32,500, and the median income for a family was $44,500. Males had a median income of $32,125 versus $23,393 for females. The per capita income for the city was $17,949. About 11.2% of families and 12.7% of the population were below the poverty line, including 14.0% of those under age 18 and 11.8% of those age 65 or over.

== Education ==
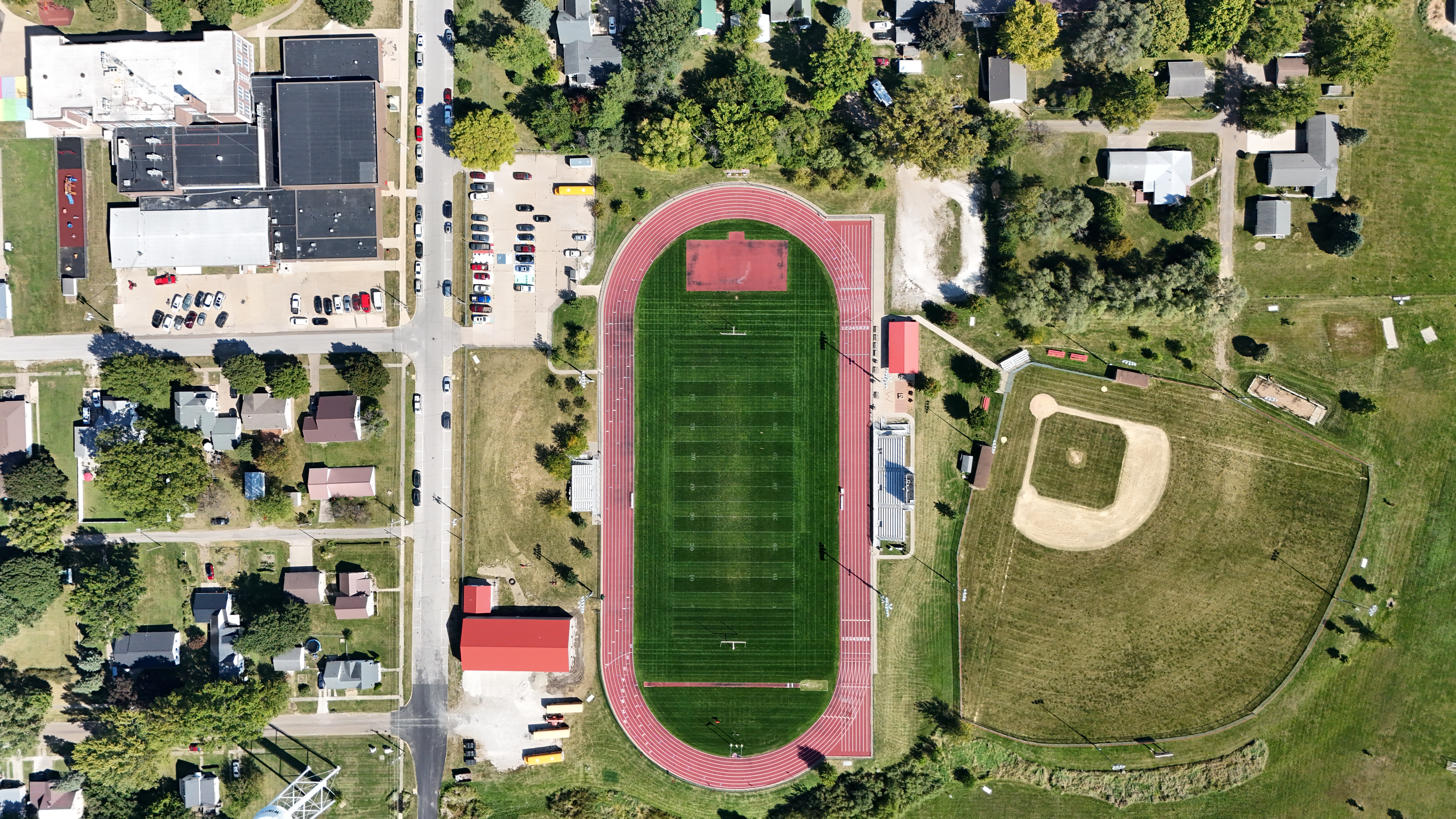
Winfield - Mt. Union highschool (upper left) and associated athletic fields

Winfield is home to the Winfield-Mt. Union Community School District. WMU is classified as a 1A school. Their football team has been 8-player since 2015. Their mascot is the Wolves, and is a member of the Southeast Iowa Superconference (SEISC) North Division.

== Notable people ==
- Cam Buffington, college football player
- Harry Edward Stinson, sculptor.
- Bill Bryson, Sr., sportswriter
