= Peter J. White =

Political advisor to President Trump

Senior Policy Analyst
- In office January 20, 2017 – January 20, 2021
- President: Donald Trump
- Preceded by: Office established
- Succeeded by: Vacant

Personal details
- Born: Huntsville, Alabama
- Political party: Republican
- Education: Washington College of Law (JD)

Peter J. White is an American government official who was Senior Policy Analyst on the Domestic Policy Council for President Donald Trump. He reported to Stephen Miller, a former staffer of Sen. Jeff Sessions who was a Trump senior advisor.

== Biography ==
White graduated from Grissom High School in Huntsville, Alabama. He attended the American University Washington College of Law in Washington, DC.

White was employed by Congressman Mo Brooks, representing Alabama's 5th congressional district, serving as Brooks' Legislative Counsel, where he crafted legislation relating to immigration, space, and cybersecurity, and served as Brooks' chief advisor on judiciary and transportation issues. He has also worked at the Federal Trade Commission in the Office of International Affairs and the Bureau of Competition, and the Federal Communications Commission's Spectrum and Competition Policy Division of the Wireless Telecommunications Bureau. White is an active member of the Federalist Society, an Eagle Scout, an avid pianist, a licensed private pilot, and performs pro bono legal work for the Washington Legal Clinic for the Homeless.

== Trump administration ==
White manages aerospace policy for President Trump's Domestic Policy Council and drafted the executive order reinstating the National Space Council. White advocated for development of a new space station called the Lunar Gateway, and an expansion of the Federal Aviation Administration's office that oversees commercial space transportation. White is an active member of the Federalist Society, described as “one of the most influential legal organizations in American history, with intellectual reach and political clout that no other legal group can match,” and the group to which President Trump “effectively outsourced his Supreme Court picks.” White was identified by progressive research organization ThinkProgress as one of eight Trump staffers, a “secret hatchet team,” who are "quietly leading the charge" to "systematically dismantle the federal government."
