= Ainsworth, Iowa =

- City
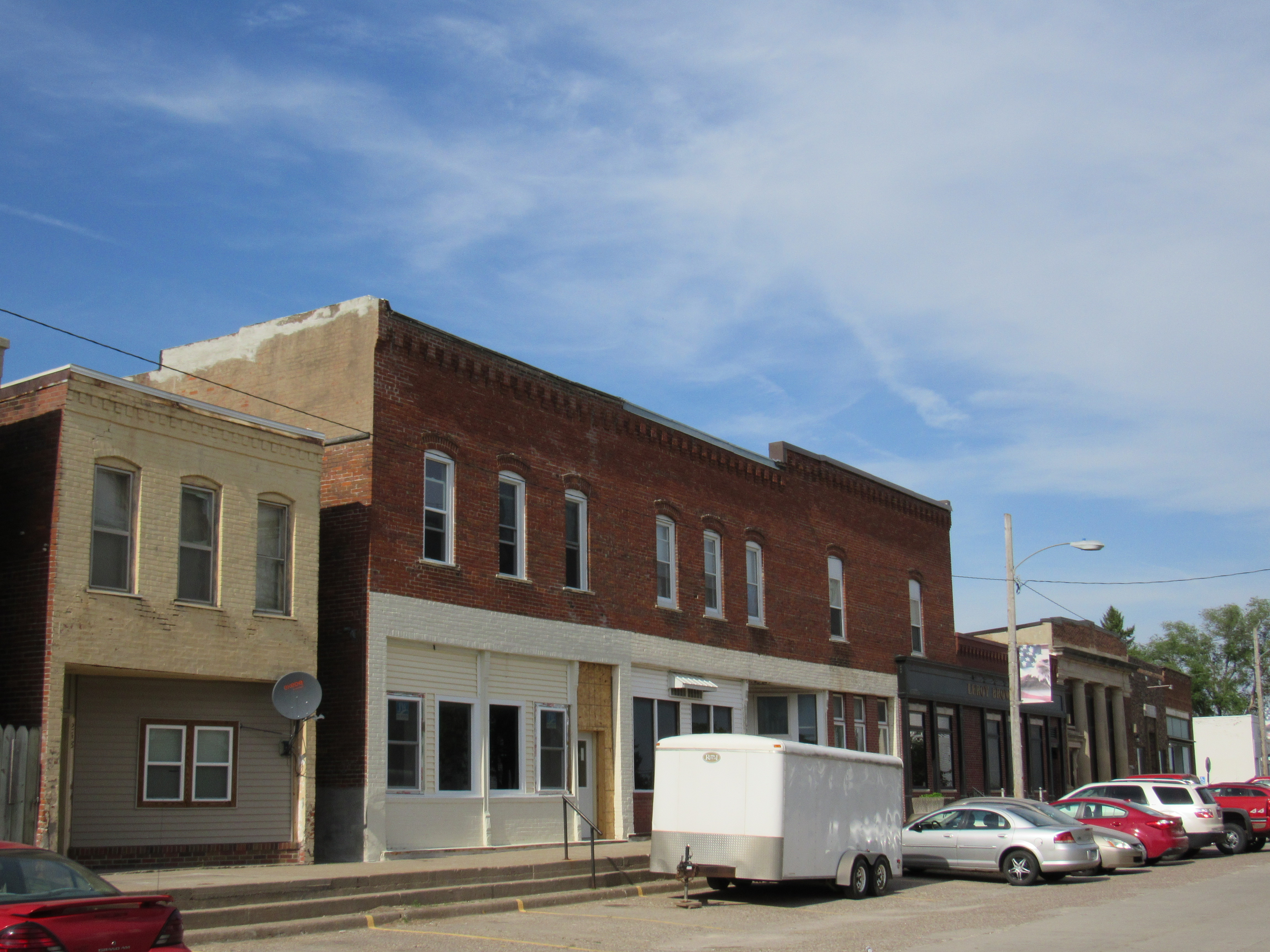
- Downtown Ainsworth

- Location of Ainsworth in Washington County and in Iowa
- Coordinates: 41°17′24″N 91°33′16″W
- Country: United States
- State: Iowa
- County: Washington

Area
  - Total: 0.37 sq mi (0.97 km^{2})
  - Land: 0.37 sq mi (0.96 km^{2})
  - Water: 0.0077 sq mi (0.02 km^{2})
- Elevation: 735 ft (224 m)

Population (2020)
  - Total: 511
  - Density: 1,385.5/sq mi (534.94/km^{2})
- Time zone: UTC-6 (Central (CST))
  - Summer (DST): UTC-5 (CDT)
- ZIP code: 52201
- Area code: 319
- FIPS code: 19-00730
- GNIS feature ID: 2393892

Ainsworth is a city in Washington County, Iowa, United States. It is a part of the Iowa City, Iowa Metropolitan Statistical Area. The population was 511 at the 2020 census. It is part of the Highland Community School District.

== History ==
Ainsworth was laid out in 1858, and named after its founder, D. H. Ainsworth. The town was incorporated June 18, 1892.

== Geography ==
According to the United States Census Bureau, the city has a total area of 0.38 square miles (0.98 km^{2}), all of it land.

== Demographics ==
Historical populations
Year	Pop.	±%
1880	318	—
1890	355	+11.6%
1900	404	+13.8%
1910	408	+1.0%
1920	391	−4.2%
1930	359	−8.2%
1940	415	+15.6%
1950	396	−4.6%
1960	371	−6.3%
1970	455	+22.6%
1980	547	+20.2%
1990	506	−7.5%
2000	524	+3.6%
2010	567	+8.2%
2020	511	−9.9%
Source:"U.S. Census website". United States Census Bureau. and Iowa Data Center; Source: U.S. Decennial Census

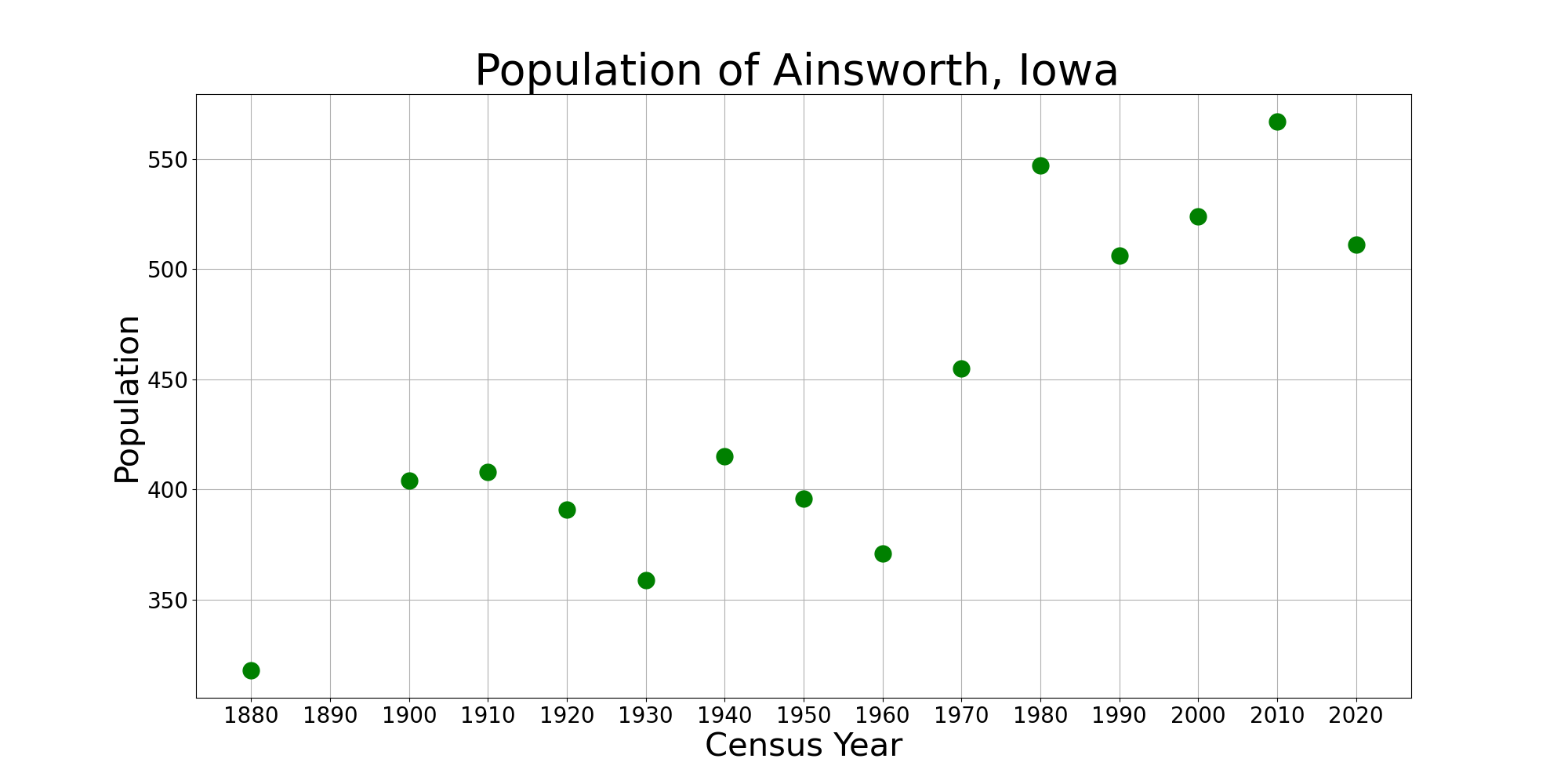
The population of Ainsworth, Iowa from US census data

=== 2020 census ===
As of the census of 2020, there were 511 people, 195 households, and 140 families residing in the city. The population density was 1,385.5 inhabitants per square mile (534.9/km^{2}). There were 210 housing units at an average density of 569.4 per square mile (219.8/km^{2}). The racial makeup of the city was 80.4% White, 0.2% Black or African American, 0.4% Native American, 0.4% Asian, 0.0% Pacific Islander, 10.0% from other races and 8.6% from two or more races. Hispanic or Latino persons of any race comprised 20.5% of the population.

Of the 195 households, 36.9% of which had children under the age of 18 living with them, 50.3% were married couples living together, 6.2% were cohabitating couples, 22.6% had a female householder with no spouse or partner present and 21.0% had a male householder with no spouse or partner present. 28.2% of all households were non-families. 21.5% of all households were made up of individuals, 9.7% had someone living alone who was 65 years old or older.

The median age in the city was 37.7 years. 27.6% of the residents were under the age of 20; 4.9% were between the ages of 20 and 24; 25.0% were from 25 and 44; 27.0% were from 45 and 64; and 15.5% were 65 years of age or older. The gender makeup of the city was 51.3% male and 48.7% female.

=== 2010 census ===
As of the census of 2010, there were 567 people, 209 households, and 153 families living in the city. The population density was 1,492.1 inhabitants per square mile (576.1/km^{2}). There were 218 housing units at an average density of 573.7 per square mile (221.5/km^{2}). The racial makeup of the city was 92.1% White, 0.9% African American, 4.9% from other races, and 2.1% from two or more races. Hispanic or Latino of any race were 20.6% of the population.

There were 209 households, of which 41.1% had children under the age of 18 living with them, 58.9% were married couples living together, 9.6% had a female householder with no husband present, 4.8% had a male householder with no wife present, and 26.8% were non-families. 21.5% of all households were made up of individuals, and 8.6% had someone living alone who was 65 years of age or older. The average household size was 2.71 and the average family size was 3.16.

The median age in the city was 33.4 years. 31.2% of residents were under the age of 18; 8.2% were between the ages of 18 and 24; 26.7% were from 25 to 44; 23.4% were from 45 to 64; and 10.6% were 65 years of age or older. The gender makeup of the city was 49.2% male and 50.8% female.

=== 2000 census ===
As of the census of 2000, there were 524 people, 199 households, and 137 families living in the city. The population density was 1,381.0 inhabitants per square mile (533.2/km^{2}). There were 208 housing units at an average density of 548.2 per square mile (211.7/km^{2}). The racial makeup of the city was 91.41% White, 0.38% Native American, 8.02% from other races, and 0.19% from two or more races. Hispanic or Latino of any race were 15.65% of the population.

There were 199 households, out of which 34.2% had children under the age of 18 living with them, 58.8% were married couples living together, 8.0% had a female householder with no husband present, and 30.7% were non-families. 28.1% of all households were made up of individuals, and 14.1% had someone living alone who was 65 years of age or older. The average household size was 2.63 and the average family size was 3.26.

Age spread: 30.0% under the age of 18, 6.7% from 18 to 24, 31.7% from 25 to 44, 19.7% from 45 to 64, and 12.0% who were 65 years of age or older. The median age was 34 years. For every 100 females, there were 107.9 males. For every 100 females age 18 and over, there were 102.8 males.

The median income for a household in the city was $41,071, and the median income for a family was $50,208. Males had a median income of $30,938 versus $19,583 for females. The per capita income for the city was $15,627. About 7.2% of families and 10.0% of the population were below the poverty line, including 15.3% of those under age 18 and 10.0% of those age 65 or over.

== Education ==
Highland Community School District operates public schools serving the community, including Highland Elementary School in Riverside and Highland Middle-High School in an unincorporated area.

The district previously operated Ainsworth Elementary School, which closed in 2017. In 2017 the school had 70 students. District leadership stated that it would have had to spend upkeep of $50,000 if it remained open. Students were rezoned to Highland Elementary.
