= Oregon Township, Washington County, Iowa =

Township in Washington County, Iowa, U.S.

Coordinates: 41.2967°N 91.5450°W

Oregon Township is a township in Washington County, Iowa, United States.

== History ==
Oregon Township was established in 1847. It was named by an early settler who was considering moving to Oregon.
