= Marvin Stone (basketball) =

American basketball player (1981–2008)

Personal information
- Born: June 2, 1981 Huntsville, Alabama, U.S.
- Died: April 1, 2008 (aged 26) Saudi Arabia
- Listed height: 6 ft 10 in (2.08 m)
- Listed weight: 240 lb (109 kg)

Career information
- High school: Grissom (Huntsville, Alabama)
- College: Kentucky (1999–2002); Louisville (2002–2003)
- NBA draft: 2003: undrafted
- Playing career: 2003–2008
- Position: Center

Career history
- 2003–2004: Paris-Levallois Basket
- 2004: Alerta Cantabria
- 2004–2006: Huelva Baloncesto
- 2006: Olimpiada Patron B.C.
- 2007–2008: Omonia B.C.
- 2008: Ittihad

Career highlights
- First-team Parade All-American (1999); Third-team Parade All-American (1998); McDonald's All-American (1999); Alabama Mr. Basketball (1999)

Marvin Stone Jr. (June 2, 1981 – April 1, 2008) was an American professional basketball player.

Stone was a native of Huntsville, Alabama. While attending Virgil I. Grissom High School he led Grissom to the school's second-ever 6A State Title in 1999. The 6'10" center/power forward was regarded as one of the top recruits in the country, as a Parade All American & McDonald's All-American. He was the most decorated Athlete that Grissom High School has ever seen. He was selected for the 1999 McDonald's All-American Game, and signed for Kentucky. However, his career at Kentucky was largely disappointing. In two-and-a-half seasons at Kentucky, he averaged 5.3 points and 4.2 rebounds before transferring to intrastate rivals Louisville during the 2001–02 season. In one season at Louisville, he averaged 10.3 points, 7.1 rebounds, and 1.5 blocked shots.

Stone was undrafted in the 2003 NBA draft, and later played professionally in Europe for a number of teams, including Ciudad de Huelva (Spain), Air Avellino (Italy) and Paris Basket Racing (France). In 2005, Stone failed medical tests of the German clubs ALBA Berlin and EWE Baskets Oldenburg due to "conspicuous cardiological results" and hypertension which were associated with his generally bad physical fitness, although it could not be determined if that was its cause or its effect.

Stone died of a heart attack on April 1, 2008, while playing for Saudi Arabian team Ittihad. He collapsed at halftime during a playoff game. He had signed with the team only days before.

== See also ==
- List of basketball players who died during their careers
