= West Chester, Iowa =

- City
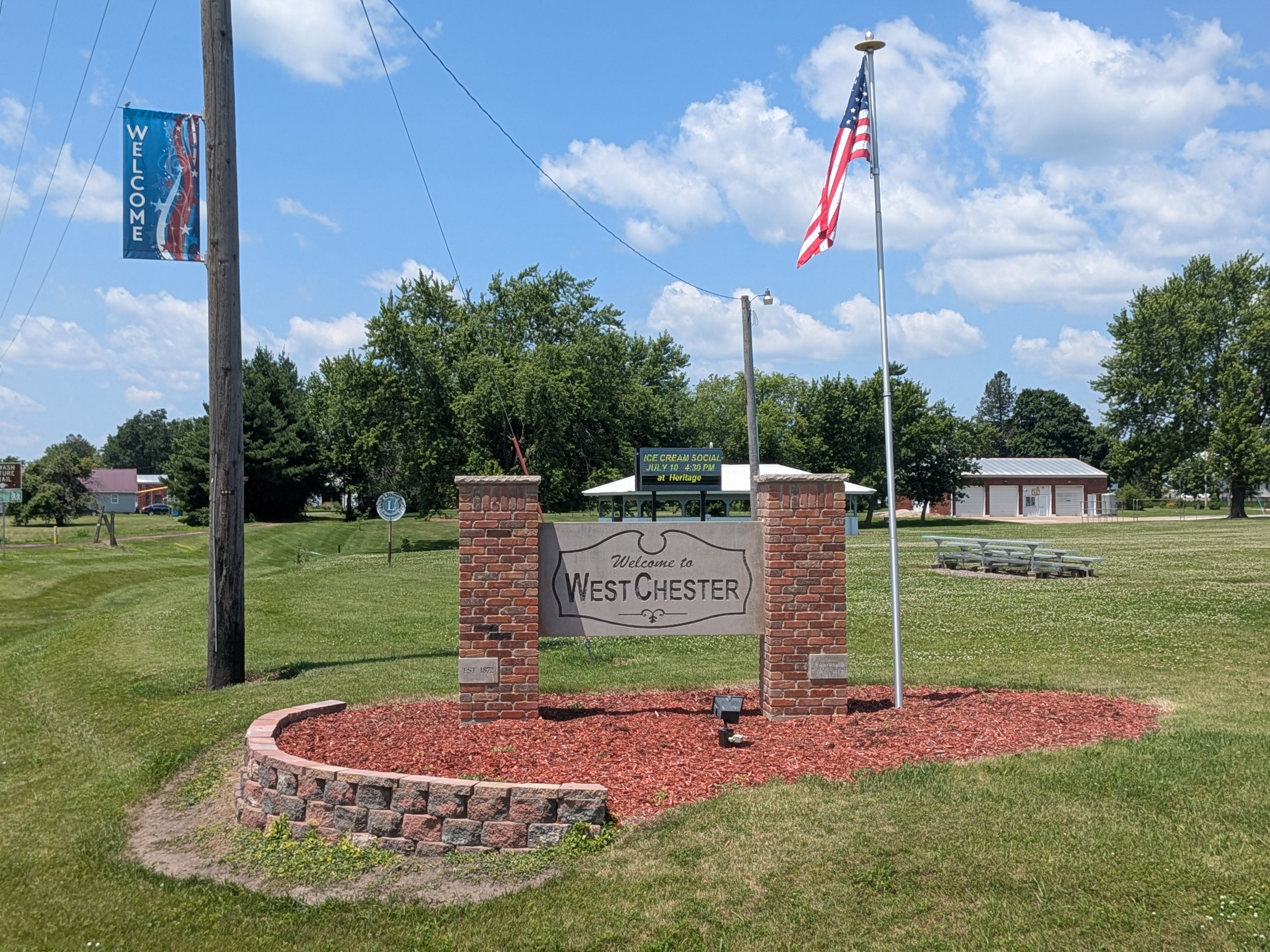
- West Chester's welcome sign

- Location of West Chester, Iowa
- Coordinates: 41°20′24″N 91°49′01″W
- Country: United States
- State: Iowa
- County: Washington

Area
  - Total: 0.25 sq mi (0.66 km^{2})
  - Land: 0.25 sq mi (0.66 km^{2})
  - Water: 0 sq mi (0.00 km^{2})
- Elevation: 774 ft (236 m)

Population (2020)
  - Total: 144
  - Density: 568.6/sq mi (219.53/km^{2})
- Time zone: UTC-6 (Central (CST))
  - Summer (DST): UTC-5 (CDT)
- ZIP code: 52359
- Area code: 319
- FIPS code: 19-83775
- GNIS feature ID: 2397263

West Chester is a city in Washington County, Iowa, United States. It is part of the Iowa City, Iowa Metropolitan Statistical Area. The population was 144 at the time of the 2020 census.

== History ==
West Chester was laid out in 1872.

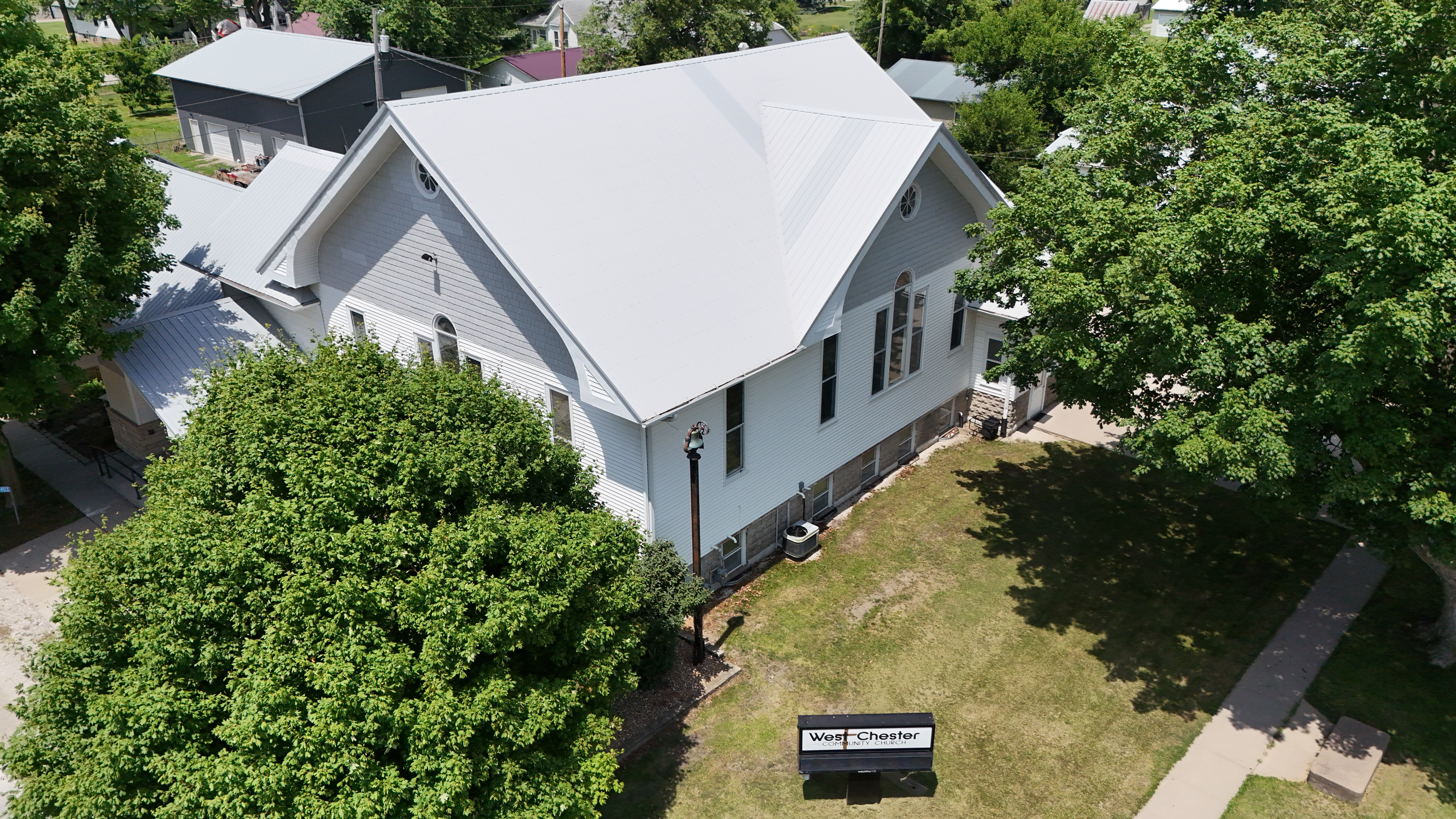
West Chester Community Church

== Geography ==
According to the United States Census Bureau, the city has a total area of 0.25 square miles (0.65 km^{2}), all of it land.

== Demographics ==
Historical populations
Year	Pop.	±%
1880	92	—
1890	146	+58.7%
1900	209	+43.2%
1910	222	+6.2%
1920	225	+1.4%
1930	223	−0.9%
1940	213	−4.5%
1950	218	+2.3%
1960	253	+16.1%
1970	199	−21.3%
1980	191	−4.0%
1990	178	−6.8%
2000	159	−10.7%
2010	146	−8.2%
2020	144	−1.4%
Source:"U.S. Census website". United States Census Bureau. and Iowa Data Center; Source: U.S. Decennial Census

=== 2020 census ===
As of the census of 2020, there were 144 people, 59 households, and 47 families residing in the city. The population density was 568.6 inhabitants per square mile (219.5/km^{2}). There were 67 housing units at an average density of 264.5 per square mile (102.1/km^{2}). The racial makeup of the city was 91.0% White, 0.0% Black or African American, 0.0% Native American, 0.0% Asian, 0.0% Pacific Islander, 0.7% from other races and 8.3% from two or more races. Hispanic or Latino persons of any race comprised 2.1% of the population.

Of the 59 households, 40.7% of which had children under the age of 18 living with them, 35.6% were married couples living together, 10.2% were cohabitating couples, 25.4% had a female householder with no spouse or partner present and 28.8% had a male householder with no spouse or partner present. 20.3% of all households were non-families. 15.3% of all households were made up of individuals, 6.8% had someone living alone who was 65 years old or older.

The median age in the city was 44.5 years. 22.2% of the residents were under the age of 20; 4.2% were between the ages of 20 and 24; 23.6% were from 25 and 44; 31.9% were from 45 and 64; and 18.1% were 65 years of age or older. The gender makeup of the city was 50.0% male and 50.0% female.

=== 2010 census ===
At the 2010 census there were 146 people in 63 households, including 45 families, in the city. The population density was 584.0 inhabitants per square mile (225.5/km^{2}). There were 75 housing units at an average density of 300.0 per square mile (115.8/km^{2}). The racial makup of the city was 95.2% White, 0.7% African American, 0.7% Native American, 0.7% from other races, and 2.7% from two or more races. Hispanic or Latino of any race were 2.1%.

Of the 63 households 25.4% had children under the age of 18 living with them, 52.4% were married couples living together, 11.1% had a female householder with no husband present, 7.9% had a male householder with no wife present, and 28.6% were non-families. 27.0% of households were one person and 9.5% were one person aged 65 or older. The average household size was 2.32 and the average family size was 2.73.

The median age was 46.7 years. 19.2% of residents were under the age of 18; 6.7% were between the ages of 18 and 24; 19.9% were from 25 to 44; 35.6% were from 45 to 64; and 18.5% were 65 or older. The gender makeup of the city was 52.7% male and 47.3% female.

=== 2000 census ===
At the 2000 census there were 159 people in 70 households, including 42 families, in the city. The population density was 629.0 inhabitants per square mile (242.9/km^{2}). There were 74 housing units at an average density of 292.8 per square mile (113.1/km^{2}). The racial makup of the city was 98.74% White, and 1.26% from two or more races.

Of the 70 households 21.4% had children under the age of 18 living with them, 50.0% were married couples living together, 7.1% had a female householder with no husband present, and 38.6% were non-families. 28.6% of households were one person and 10.0% were one person aged 65 or older. The average household size was 2.27 and the average family size was 2.84.

The age distribution was 17.0% under the age of 18, 7.5% from 18 to 24, 28.9% from 25 to 44, 31.4% from 45 to 64, and 15.1% 65 or older. The median age was 44 years. For every 100 females, there were 106.5 males. For every 100 females age 18 and over, there were 97.0 males.

The median household income was $37,500 and the median family income was $41,250. Males had a median income of $35,179 versus $21,667 for females. The per capita income for the city was $22,609. About 5.6% of families and 6.8% of the population were below the poverty line, including none of those under the age of eighteen and 25.0% of those sixty five or over.

== Education ==
The Mid-Prairie Community School District operates local area public schools.

== Notable people ==
- Dick Crayne, NFL Player, University of Iowa Football player
