= Iowa Township, Washington County, Iowa =

Township in Washington County, Iowa, U.S.

Coordinates: 41.4647°N 91.5633°W

Iowa Township is a township in Washington County, Iowa, United States.

== History ==
Iowa Township was laid off in 1844.
