= Haskins, Iowa =

- Unincorporated community
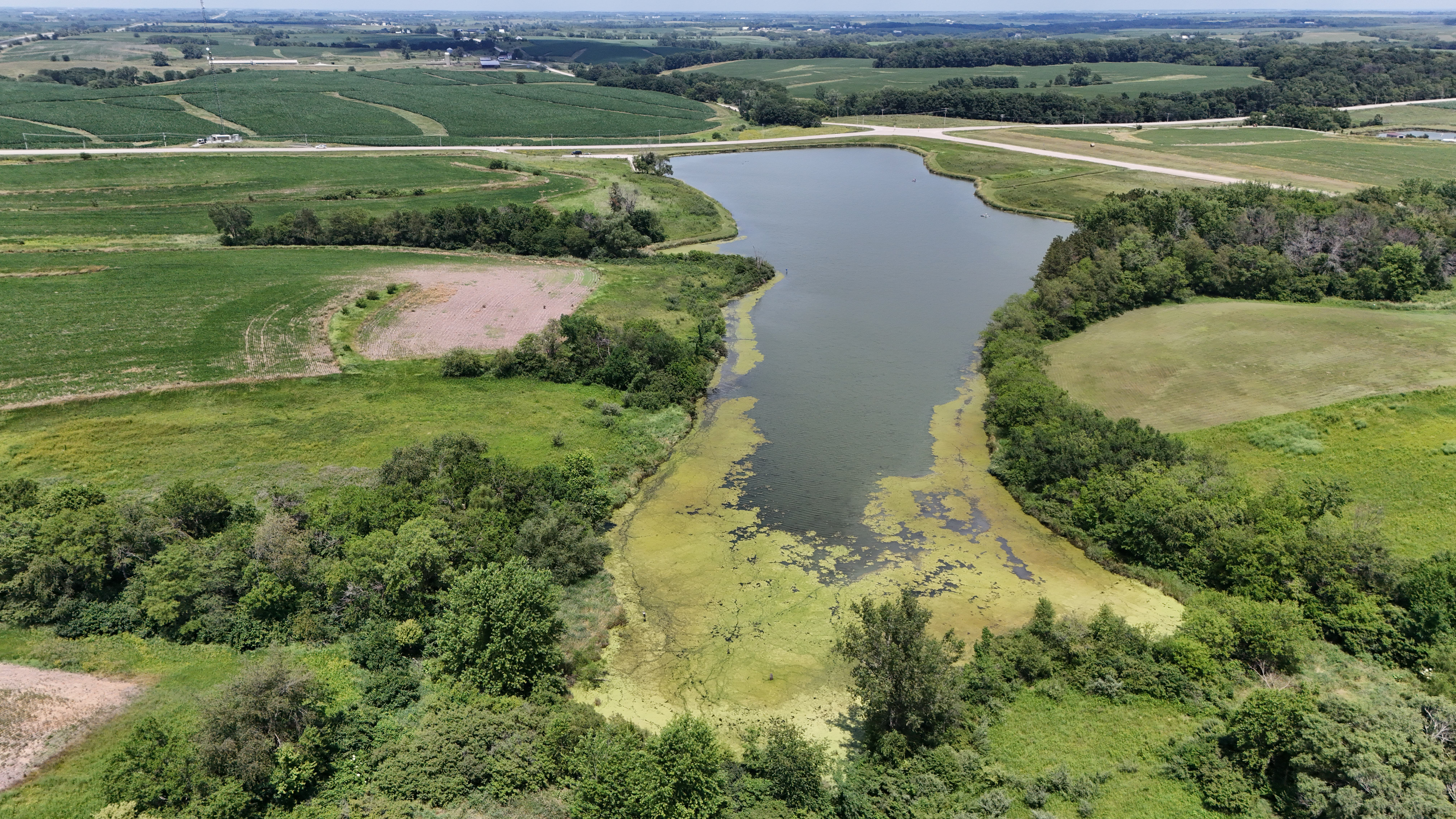
- Crawford Pond Park, 0.7 miles northwest of Haskins

- Location within Iowa
- Coordinates: 41°19′41″N 91°32′13″W
- Country: United States
- State: Iowa
- County: Washington
- Elevation: 758 ft (231 m)
- Time zone: UTC-6 (Central (CST))
  - Summer (DST): UTC-5 (CDT)
- Area code: 319
- GNIS feature ID: 457309

Haskins is an unincorporated community in Washington County, Iowa, United States.

== History ==
The population was 83 in 1940.
