= Lime Creek Township, Washington County, Iowa =

Township in Washington County, Iowa, U.S.

Coordinates: 41.4678°N 91.8589°W

Lime Creek Township is a township in Washington County, Iowa, United States.

== History ==
Lime Creek Township was organized in 1845.
