= Franklin Township, Washington County, Iowa =

Township in Washington County, Iowa

Coordinates: 41.2900°N 91.7831°W

Franklin Township is a township in Washington County, Iowa, United States.

== History ==
Franklin Township was established in 1854.
