= Washington Township, Washington County, Iowa =

Township in Washington County, Iowa, U.S.

Coordinates: 41.3003°N 91.6694°W

Washington Township is a township in Washington County, Iowa, United States.

== History ==
Washington Township was established in 1844.
