= Kay Cornelius =

American novelist

- Born: January 14, 1933
- Died: January 23, 2017 (aged 84); Huntsville, Alabama, U.S.
- Occupation: Novelist
- Writing career
- Period: 1985-present
- Genres: Christian romance Biography; Young Adult
- Notable awards: Sullivan Award (Peabody College, 1952)

Kay Oldham Cornelius (January 14, 1933 – January 23, 2017) was a published author with more than a dozen novels to her credit. She also wrote test units for the PSAT and College Board specialized-subject achievement tests, as well as reviewing the Board's English literature examination.

Cornelius was a teacher, mostly in the English department at Virgil I. Grissom High School in Huntsville, Alabama, for the majority of her 34-year teaching career. Her first novel, Love's Gentle Journey, was published in 1985. Cornelius retired from teaching to write full-time in 1990.

Cornelius was a member of the Romance Writers of America, Authors Guild, National League of American PEN Women, Alabama Writers Conclave, Alabama Writers Forum, Phi Delta Kappa, and Delta Kappa Gamma.

== Partial bibliography ==
- Love's Gentle Journey, (October 1985, Zondervan Publishing Company, ISBN 978-0-310-47002-1)
- More Than Conquerors, (January 1994, Heartsong Presents, ISBN 978-1-55748-452-9)
- Sign Of The Bow, (September 1994, Heartsong Presents, ISBN 978-1-55748-560-1)
- Sign Of The Eagle, (1994, Heartsong Presents, ISBN 978-1-55748-564-9)
- Sign Of The Dove, (1995, Heartsong Presents, ISBN 978-1-55748-582-3)
- A Matter of Security, (1995, Barbour Publishing Co., ISBN 978-1-55748-699-8)
- Sign Of The Spirit, (1995, Heartsong Presents, ISBN 978-1-55748-700-1)
- Politically Correct, (1996, Heartsong Presents, ISBN 978-1-57748-007-5)
- A Nostalgic Noel, (September 1998, Barbour Publishing Co., ISBN 978-1-57748-349-6)
- Twin Willows, (February 1999, Barbour Publishing Co., ISBN 978-0-06-101376-8)
- The Supreme Court, (February 2000, Chelsea House Publishers, ISBN 978-0-7910-5532-8)
- Chamique Holdsclaw (Women Who Win), (September 2000, Chelsea House Publishers, ISBN 978-0-7910-5793-3)
- Francis Marion: The Swamp Fox, (December 2000, Chelsea House Publishers, ISBN 978-0-7910-6134-3)
- Edgar Allan Poe, (2002, Chelsea House Publishers, ISBN 978-0-7910-6173-2)
- Emily Dickinson, (2002, Chelsea House Publishers, ISBN 978-0-7910-6179-4)
- Pennsylvania (novella collection), (May 2002, Barbour Publishing Co., ISBN 978-1-58660-503-2)
- Toni's Vow, (January 2004, Heartsong Presents, ISBN 978-1-59310-068-1)
- Anita's Fortune, (February 2004, Heartsong Presents, ISBN 978-1-59310-123-7)
- Mary's Choice, (August 2004, Barbour Publishing Co., ISBN 978-1-59310-139-8)
- Alabama (novel collection), (February 2005, Barbour Publishing Co., ISBN 978-1-59310-562-4)
- Summons To The Chateau D'Arc, (August 2005, Five Star Expressions, ISBN 978-1-59414-386-1)
