= English River Township, Washington County, Iowa =

Township in Washington County, Iowa, U.S.

Coordinates: 41.4669°N 91.7092°W

English River Township is a township in Washington County, Iowa, United States.

== History ==
English River Township was organized in 1845.
