= Clay Township, Washington County, Iowa =

Township in Washington County, Iowa, U.S.

Coordinates: 41.2033°N 91.8900°W

Clay Township is a township in Washington County, Iowa, United States.

== History ==
Clay Township was established in 1844.
