= Highland Township, Washington County, Iowa =

Township in Washington County, Iowa, U.S.

Coordinates: 41.3914°N 91.5456°W

Highland Township is a township in Washington County, Iowa, United States.

== History ==
Highland Township was established in 1854.
