= Crawford Township, Washington County, Iowa =

Township in Washington County, Iowa, U.S.

Coordinates: 41.2067°N 91.5417°W

Crawford Township is a township in Washington County, Iowa, United States.

== History ==
Crawford Township was established in the 1840s and Crawford is the name of a family of pioneer settlers.
