= Dutch Creek Township, Washington County, Iowa =

Township in Washington County, Iowa, U.S.

Coordinates: 41.2861°N 91.8919°W

Dutch Creek Township is a township in Washington County, Iowa, United States.

== History ==
Dutch Creek Township was established in 1844.
