= Cedar Township, Washington County, Iowa =

Township in Washington County, Iowa, U.S.

Coordinates: 41.3833°N 91.7700°W

Cedar Township is a township in Washington County, Iowa, United States.

== History ==
Cedar Township was formed in 1844. This was the same year that the first school house in the Cedar Township was built.
