= Marion Township, Washington County, Iowa =

Township in Washington County, Iowa, U.S.

Coordinates: 41.2014°N 91.6708°W

Marion Township is a township in Washington County, Iowa, United States.

== History ==
Marion Township was laid off in 1844.
