= Washington County, Iowa =

County in Iowa, United States

- County
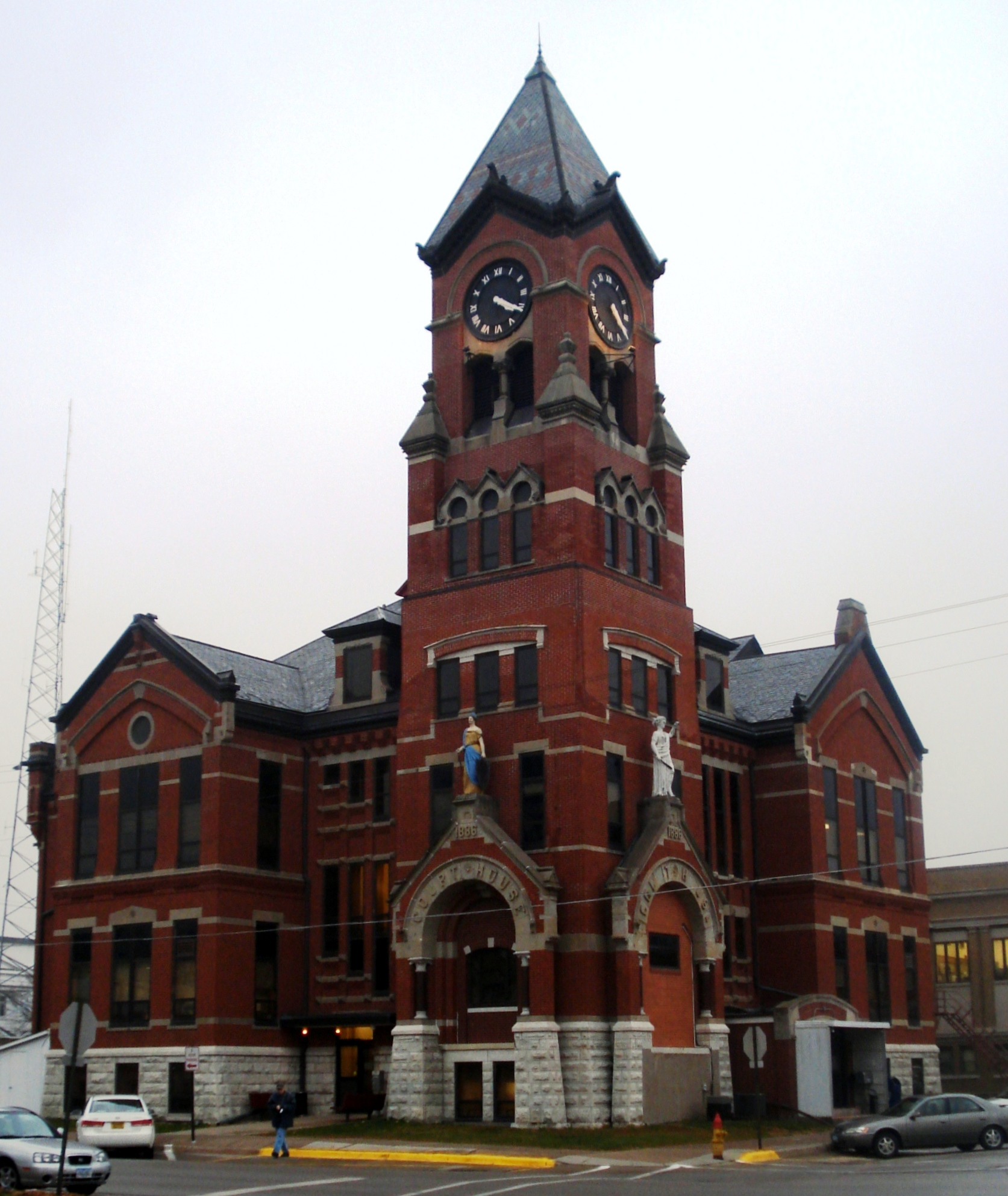
- The Washington County Courthouse in Washington

- Location within the U.S. state of Iowa
- Coordinates: 41°20′05″N 91°43′11″W
- Country: United States
- State: Iowa
- Founded: January 18, 1838
- Named for: George Washington
- Seat: Washington
- Largest city: Washington

Area
  - Total: 571 sq mi (1,480 km^{2})
  - Land: 569 sq mi (1,470 km^{2})
  - Water: 2.1 sq mi (5.4 km^{2}) 0.4%

Population (2020)
  - Total: 22,565
  - Estimate (2025): 22,667 ▲
  - Density: 39.7/sq mi (15.3/km^{2})
- Time zone: UTC−6 (Central)
  - Summer (DST): UTC−5 (CDT)
- Congressional district: 1st
- Website: washingtoncounty.iowa.gov
- Iowa county number 92

Washington County is a county located in the U.S. state of Iowa. As of the 2020 census, the population was 22,565. The county seat and the largest city is Washington. Washington County is included in the Iowa City metropolitan area.

== History ==
Washington County was originally formed in 1838 as Slaughter County in honor of William B. Slaughter, the secretary of Wisconsin Territory. The county, still named Slaughter County, became part of Iowa Territory on July 4, 1838, when it was organized. To honor George Washington, the county opted to change its name on January 25, 1839. The first White American colonizers arrived in Washington County in 1835, and began establishing individual domiciles in 1836. A settlement, Astoria, was built in the present township of Oregon; it became the first county seat and housed the first courthouse. The county seat was moved to the city of Washington in 1839.

The first religious society, organized by Reverend J.L. Kirkpatrick, a Methodist minister was created in 1839. The first newspaper was established in 1853; it was published for two years. In 1856 another newspaper started up; it has continued to the present. The major waterways through Washington County are the Skunk and English Rivers, and Crooked Creek. Timber is found in abundance around these waterways, which has allowed a timber industry to grow up. In 1855 Washington hosted the county's first bank. The county population swelled after 1858, when a railway line belonging to the Mississippi and Missouri Railroad was laid there.

== Geography ==
According to the United States Census Bureau, the county has a total area of 571 square miles (1,480 km^{2}), of which 569 square miles (1,470 km^{2}) is land and 2.1 square miles (5.4 km^{2}) (0.4%) is water.

=== Major highways ===
- U.S. Highway 218
- Iowa Highway 1
- Iowa Highway 22
- Iowa Highway 27
- Iowa Highway 78
- Iowa Highway 92

=== Adjacent counties ===
- Iowa County (northwest)
- Johnson County (northeast)
- Louisa County (east)
- Henry County (southeast)
- Jefferson County (southwest)
- Keokuk County (west)

== Demographics ==
Historical population
| Census | Pop. | Note | %± |
|---|---|---|---|
| 1850 | 4,957 | | — |
| 1860 | 14,235 | | 187.2% |
| 1870 | 18,952 | | 33.1% |
| 1880 | 20,374 | | 7.5% |
| 1890 | 18,468 | | −9.4% |
| 1900 | 20,718 | | 12.2% |
| 1910 | 19,925 | | −3.8% |
| 1920 | 20,421 | | 2.5% |
| 1930 | 19,822 | | −2.9% |
| 1940 | 20,055 | | 1.2% |
| 1950 | 19,557 | | −2.5% |
| 1960 | 19,406 | | −0.8% |
| 1970 | 18,967 | | −2.3% |
| 1980 | 20,141 | | 6.2% |
| 1990 | 19,612 | | −2.6% |
| 2000 | 20,670 | | 5.4% |
| 2010 | 21,704 | | 5.0% |
| 2020 | 22,565 | | 4.0% |
| 2025 (est.) | 22,667 | ▲ | 0.5% |
U.S. Decennial Census; 1790–1960 1900–1990; 1990–2000 2010–2020

=== 2020 census ===
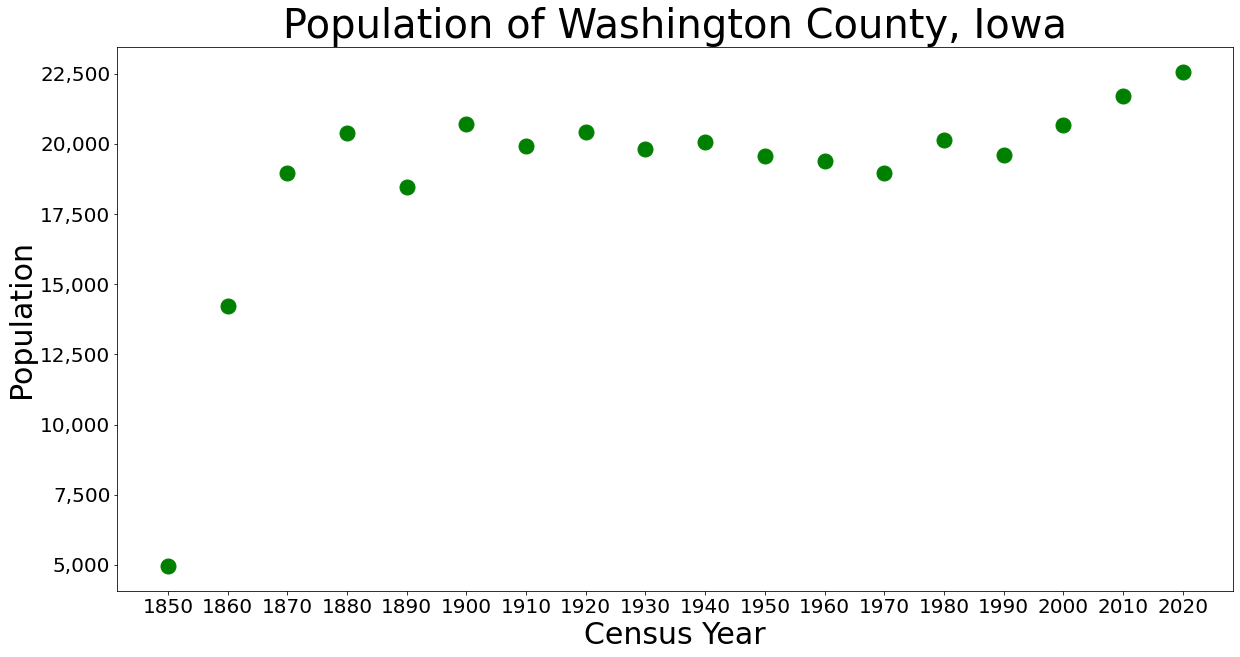
Population of Washington County from the U.S. census data

As of the 2020 census, the county had a population of 22,565 and a population density of 39.5/sq mi (15.2/km^{2}). The median age was 41.1 years, 24.3% of residents were under the age of 18, and 20.7% were 65 years of age or older. For every 100 females there were 97.1 males, and for every 100 females age 18 and over there were 94.6 males age 18 and over.

95.31% of the population reported being of a single race. The racial makeup of the county was 90.3% White, 0.8% Black or African American, 0.3% American Indian and Alaska Native, 0.5% Asian, <0.1% Native Hawaiian and Pacific Islander, 3.4% from some other race, and 4.7% from two or more races. Hispanic or Latino residents of any race comprised 7.1% of the population.

30.3% of residents lived in urban areas, while 69.7% lived in rural areas.

There were 8,916 households in the county, of which 29.9% had children under the age of 18 living in them. Of all households, 54.0% were married-couple households, 17.5% were households with a male householder and no spouse or partner present, and 22.1% were households with a female householder and no spouse or partner present. About 27.7% of all households were made up of individuals and 13.9% had someone living alone who was 65 years of age or older.

There were 9,573 housing units, of which 6.9% were vacant. Among occupied housing units, 75.5% were owner-occupied and 24.5% were renter-occupied. The homeowner vacancy rate was 1.4% and the rental vacancy rate was 6.3%.

=== 2010 census ===
As of the 2010 census recorded a population of 21,704 in the county, with a population density of 38.2/sq mi (14.7/km^{2}). There were 9,516 housing units, of which 8,741 were occupied.

=== 2000 census ===
As of the 2000 census, there were 20,670 people, 8,056 households, and 5,631 families residing in the county. The population density was 36 inhabitants per square mile (14/km^{2}). There were 8,543 housing units at an average density of 15 per square mile (5.8/km^{2}). The racial makeup of the county was 97.04% White, 0.29% Black or African American, 0.19% Native American, 0.25% Asian, 0.03% Pacific Islander, 1.51% from other races, and 0.68% from two or more races. 2.73% of the population were Hispanic or Latino of any race.

There were 8,056 households, out of which 31.40% had children under the age of 18 living with them, 60.30% were married couples living together, 6.70% had a female householder with no husband present, and 30.10% were non-families. 26.40% of all households were made up of individuals, and 12.50% had someone living alone who was 65 years of age or older. The average household size was 2.50 and the average family size was 3.04.

In the county, the population was spread out, with 26.10% under the age of 18, 7.00% from 18 to 24, 26.80% from 25 to 44, 22.30% from 45 to 64, and 17.90% who were 65 years of age or older. The median age was 39 years. For every 100 females, there were 93.00 males. For every 100 females age 18 and over, there were 90.10 males.

The median income for a household in the county was $39,103, and the median income for a family was $45,636. Males had a median income of $29,592 versus $22,818 for females. The per capita income for the county was $18,221. About 5.10% of families and 7.60% of the population were below the poverty line, including 10.30% of those under age 18 and 7.30% of those age 65 or over.

== Education ==
The county is served by 3 school districts

- Highland Community School District
- Mid-Prairie Community School District
- Washington Community School District

Highland Community School District includes:

- Highland Elementary School
- Highland Middle School
- Highland High School

== Communities ==
=== Cities ===
- Ainsworth
- Brighton
- Coppock
- Crawfordsville
- Kalona
- Keota (mostly in Keokuk County)
- Riverside
- Washington
- Wellman
- West Chester

=== Unincorporated communities ===
- Daytonville
- Grace Hill
- Haskins
- Lexington
- Nira
- Noble
- Richmond
- Rubio
- Titu
- Verdi
- Yatton

=== Townships ===
- Brighton
- Cedar
- Clay
- Crawford
- Dutch Creek
- English River
- Franklin
- Highland
- Iowa
- Jackson
- Lime Creek
- Marion
- Oregon
- Seventy-Six
- Washington

=== Population ranking ===
The population ranking of the following table is based on the 2020 census of Washington County.

† county seat

| Rank | City/Town/etc. | Municipal type | Population (2020 Census) |
|---|---|---|---|
| 1 | † Washington | City | 7,352 |
| 2 | Kalona | City | 2,630 |
| 3 | Wellman | City | 1,524 |
| 4 | Riverside | City | 1,060 |
| 5 | Brighton | City | 600 |
| 6 | Ainsworth | City | 511 |
| 7 | Crawfordsville | City | 277 |
| 8 | West Chester | City | 144 |
| 9 | Coppock (partially in Henry and Jefferson Counties) | City | 36 |

== Politics ==
United States presidential election results for Washington County, Iowa
| Year | Republican | | Democratic | | Third party(ies) | |
| Year | No. | % | No. | % | No. | % |
|---|---|---|---|---|---|---|
| 1896 | 2,882 | 54.42% | 2,292 | 43.28% | 122 | 2.30% |
| 1900 | 2,844 | 54.26% | 2,234 | 42.63% | 163 | 3.11% |
| 1904 | 2,875 | 59.24% | 1,772 | 36.51% | 206 | 4.24% |
| 1908 | 2,631 | 53.81% | 2,119 | 43.34% | 139 | 2.84% |
| 1912 | 1,264 | 26.35% | 2,003 | 41.76% | 1,530 | 31.89% |
| 1916 | 2,745 | 55.31% | 2,139 | 43.10% | 79 | 1.59% |
| 1920 | 5,813 | 71.09% | 2,257 | 27.60% | 107 | 1.31% |
| 1924 | 5,053 | 60.31% | 1,868 | 22.30% | 1,457 | 17.39% |
| 1928 | 5,948 | 68.04% | 2,754 | 31.50% | 40 | 0.46% |
| 1932 | 3,889 | 45.25% | 4,554 | 52.98% | 152 | 1.77% |
| 1936 | 4,619 | 50.66% | 4,379 | 48.03% | 120 | 1.32% |
| 1940 | 5,649 | 58.11% | 4,030 | 41.46% | 42 | 0.43% |
| 1944 | 5,308 | 60.57% | 3,423 | 39.06% | 32 | 0.37% |
| 1948 | 4,680 | 56.76% | 3,485 | 42.27% | 80 | 0.97% |
| 1952 | 6,946 | 72.47% | 2,604 | 27.17% | 35 | 0.37% |
| 1956 | 5,844 | 65.84% | 3,022 | 34.05% | 10 | 0.11% |
| 1960 | 5,861 | 64.48% | 3,222 | 35.45% | 6 | 0.07% |
| 1964 | 3,315 | 41.86% | 4,587 | 57.92% | 17 | 0.21% |
| 1968 | 4,899 | 61.68% | 2,679 | 33.73% | 365 | 4.60% |
| 1972 | 5,187 | 64.12% | 2,784 | 34.42% | 118 | 1.46% |
| 1976 | 4,218 | 54.03% | 3,448 | 44.17% | 141 | 1.81% |
| 1980 | 3,967 | 52.01% | 2,877 | 37.72% | 783 | 10.27% |
| 1984 | 4,613 | 59.37% | 3,079 | 39.63% | 78 | 1.00% |
| 1988 | 3,741 | 49.12% | 3,776 | 49.58% | 99 | 1.30% |
| 1992 | 3,576 | 39.65% | 3,384 | 37.52% | 2,058 | 22.82% |
| 1996 | 3,600 | 44.05% | 3,828 | 46.84% | 745 | 9.12% |
| 2000 | 4,827 | 53.08% | 3,932 | 43.24% | 335 | 3.68% |
| 2004 | 5,977 | 55.92% | 4,595 | 42.99% | 116 | 1.09% |
| 2008 | 5,247 | 49.36% | 5,170 | 48.64% | 212 | 1.99% |
| 2012 | 5,562 | 50.55% | 5,115 | 46.48% | 327 | 2.97% |
| 2016 | 6,173 | 56.48% | 3,943 | 36.08% | 813 | 7.44% |
| 2020 | 6,971 | 59.25% | 4,561 | 38.77% | 233 | 1.98% |
| 2024 | 7,119 | 61.43% | 4,297 | 37.08% | 172 | 1.48% |

== See also ==
- Washington County Courthouse
- National Register of Historic Places listings in Washington County, Iowa
