= Wellman, Iowa =

- City
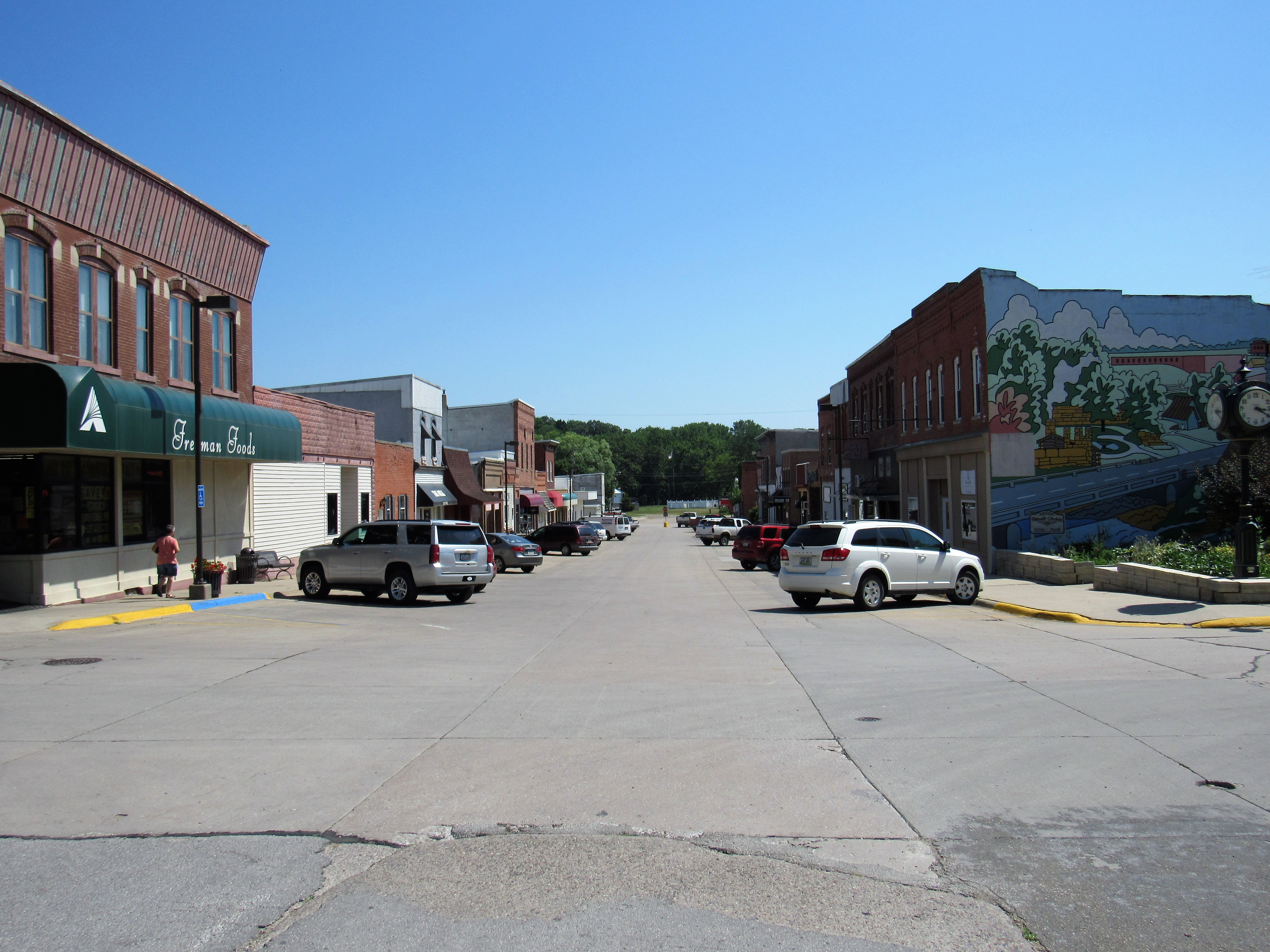
- Wellman's Downtown District

- Location of Wellman, Iowa
- Coordinates: 41°28′09″N 91°50′07″W
- Country: United States
- State: Iowa
- County: Washington

Area
  - Total: 1.07 sq mi (2.78 km^{2})
  - Land: 1.07 sq mi (2.78 km^{2})
  - Water: 0 sq mi (0.00 km^{2})
- Elevation: 755 ft (230 m)

Population (2020)
  - Total: 1,524
  - Density: 1,421.7/sq mi (548.93/km^{2})
- Time zone: UTC-6 (Central (CST))
  - Summer (DST): UTC-5 (CDT)
- ZIP code: 52356
- Area code: 319
- FIPS code: 19-83280
- GNIS feature ID: 2397248
- Website: www.cityofwellman.com

Wellman is a city in Washington County, Iowa, United States. It is part of the Iowa City, Iowa Metropolitan Statistical Area. The population was 1,524 at the time of the 2020 census.

== History ==
Wellman is named for Joseph Edward Wellman, who in July, 1879, provided 40 acres (160,000 m^{2}) of his farmland for railroad construction including lots for development near the depot. Mr. Wellman was born in Lawrence County, Kentucky on 12 May 1824, acquired his farm in 1859, and died in Wellman on 14 January 1901.

Original European settlement of the area occurred in 1839 on the north side of the English River north of Wellman. A gristmill began operation in 1842, and the community of Wassonville was surveyed and platted in 1848. The Wassonville ferry served a major territorial road from Iowa City to Oskaloosa and the western frontier. A roadhouse had been constructed by 1850 and population grew to 300. Wassonville residents discouraged by frequent flood damage from the English River established the replacement village of Dayton on higher ground south of Wassonville in 1855. Dayton was the main trading point of the area from about 1860 to 1880, and the name was changed to Daytonville by the United States Post Office in 1878.

Construction of the Burlington, Cedar Rapids and Northern Railway depot shifted the focus of trade south to Wellman. The City of Wellman was incorporated in 1885, and a city water system was completed in 1896. The volunteer fire department established in 1893 was challenged by a fire which destroyed the east side of Main Street in February, 1902. The railway became part of the Chicago, Rock Island and Pacific Railroad in 1903. The first concrete sidewalk was built in front of the Wellman Savings Bank in 1904 and main street was paved in 1927. The first sewage treatment plant was built in 1940. The first fire truck went into service in August, 1946. Natural gas became available from the Wellman Municipal Gas System in 1963.

== Geography ==
Wellman is located in the northwestern corner of the county and in the southeastern part of the state.

According to the United States Census Bureau, the city has a total area of 1.14 square miles (2.95 km^{2}), all of it land.

== Overview ==
Wellman was founded in 1878 and had a centennial celebration in 1979. The town holds an annual, family-oriented Fourth of July celebration. The city's motto is: "A Town That Cares"

The local weekly newspaper is the Wellman Advance. The city is served by its own volunteer ambulance service and volunteer fire department, which celebrated its 100th anniversary in 1978. Enhanced 911 service is available in the entire area. Two municipal parks are within the city limits - The North Park provides recreational facilities including lighted tennis courts, lighted baseball diamonds, playground facilities, a YMCA and a band shelter. The South Park is located along the "Smith Creek" waterway and is used extensively for horse shows and various entertainment programs. The English River winds its way just north of Wellman and provides for an abundance of sightseeing, hiking, canoeing and bird watching. The city has one of the few remaining golf courses with sand greens.

== Demographics ==
Historical populations
Year	Pop.	±%
1900	654	—
1910	724	+10.7%
1920	875	+20.9%
1930	853	−2.5%
1940	1,129	+32.4%
1950	1,071	−5.1%
1960	1,085	+1.3%
1970	977	−10.0%
1980	1,125	+15.1%
1990	1,085	−3.6%
2000	1,393	+28.4%
2010	1,408	+1.1%
2020	1,524	+8.2%
Source:"U.S. Census website". United States Census Bureau. and Iowa Data Center; Source: U.S. Decennial Census

=== 2020 census ===
As of the 2020 census, Wellman had a population of 1,524, with 589 households and 378 families residing in the city. The population density was 1,426.9 inhabitants per square mile (550.9/km^{2}). There were 636 housing units at an average density of 595.5 per square mile (229.9/km^{2}).

0.0% of residents lived in urban areas, while 100.0% lived in rural areas.

Among households, 30.7% had children under the age of 18 living with them, 52.6% were married couples living together, 8.0% were cohabitating couples, 22.6% had a female householder with no spouse or partner present, and 16.8% had a male householder with no spouse or partner present. 35.8% of all households were non-families. About 29.7% of all households were made up of individuals, and 15.6% had someone living alone who was 65 years old or older.

Of all housing units, 7.4% were vacant. The homeowner vacancy rate was 0.7% and the rental vacancy rate was 6.5%.

The median age in the city was 42.0 years. 26.5% of residents were under the age of 20; 4.6% were between the ages of 20 and 24; 22.6% were from 25 to 44; 23.4% were from 45 to 64; and 22.9% were 65 years of age or older. The gender makeup of the city was 48.8% male and 51.2% female. For every 100 females there were 95.4 males, and for every 100 females age 18 and over there were 93.0 males age 18 and over.

Racial composition as of the 2020 census
Race	Number	Percent
White	1,404	92.1%
Black or African American	9	0.6%
American Indian and Alaska Native	6	0.4%
Asian	0	0.0%
Native Hawaiian and Other Pacific Islander	0	0.0%
Some other race	35	2.3%
Two or more races	70	4.6%
Hispanic or Latino (of any race)	64	4.2%

=== 2010 census ===
As of the census of 2010, there were 1,408 people, 608 households, and 357 families residing in the city. The population density was 1,235.1 inhabitants per square mile (476.9/km^{2}). There were 659 housing units at an average density of 578.1 per square mile (223.2/km^{2}). The racial makeup of the city was 97.3% White, 0.1% African American, 0.5% Native American, 0.1% Asian, 0.4% from other races, and 1.6% from two or more races. Hispanic or Latino of any race were 1.8% of the population.

There were 608 households, of which 28.9% had children under the age of 18 living with them, 47.2% were married couples living together, 9.7% had a female householder with no husband present, 1.8% had a male householder with no wife present, and 41.3% were non-families. 36.8% of all households were made up of individuals, and 17.8% had someone living alone who was 65 years of age or older. The average household size was 2.24 and the average family size was 2.96.

The median age in the city was 42.5 years. 24.1% of residents were under the age of 18; 6.8% were between the ages of 18 and 24; 22.2% were from 25 to 44; 25.5% were from 45 to 64; and 21.4% were 65 years of age or older. The gender makeup of the city was 46.9% male and 53.1% female.

=== 2000 census ===
As of the census of 2000, there were 1,393 people, 549 households, and 372 families residing in the city. The population density was 1,419.6 inhabitants per square mile (548.1/km^{2}). There were 570 housing units at an average density of 580.9 per square mile (224.3/km^{2}). The racial makeup of the city was 98.71% White, 0.14% Native American, 0.07% Asian, 0.22% from other races, and 0.86% from two or more races. Hispanic or Latino of any race were 1.36% of the population.

There were 549 households, out of which 29.0% had children under the age of 18 living with them, 55.6% were married couples living together, 8.6% had a female householder with no husband present, and 32.2% were non-families. 30.4% of all households were made up of individuals, and 16.0% had someone living alone who was 65 years of age or older. The average household size was 2.40 and the average family size was 2.96.

24.8% were under the age of 18, 7.4% from 18 to 24, 23.8% from 25 to 44, 19.6% from 45 to 64, and 24.4% were 65 years of age or older. The median age was 40 years. For every 100 females, there were 94.6 males. For every 100 females age 18 and over, there were 85.5 males.

The median income for a household in the city was $37,083, and the median income for a family was $40,568. Males had a median income of $28,750 versus $23,807 for females. The per capita income for the city was $17,430. About 5.8% of families and 7.3% of the population were below the poverty line, including 7.2% of those under age 18 and 10.2% of those age 65 or over.

== Education ==
Local public schools include Mid Prairie High School and West Elementary, part of the Mid-Prairie Community School District, and Hillcrest Academy, a private Christian school, is to the northeast. The University of Iowa is 25 miles (40 km) away in Iowa City.

== Churches ==
There are seven different churches in the town of Wellman: Asbury Methodist Church, St. Joseph's Catholic Church, First Baptist Church, New Life Community Church, Wellman Mennonite Church, Good Shepard Lutheran Church, and Zion Christian Fellowship.

== Notable people ==
- Rudy W. Roethlisberger, Wisconsin State Assemblyman and farmer, was born in Wellman.
