= Mid-Prairie Community School District =

Public school district in Wellman, Iowa, United States

Coordinates: 41.468189°N 91.823103°W

Location
- Wellman, Iowa Washington, Iowa, and Johnson counties United States
- Coordinates: 41.468189, -91.823103

District information
- Type: Local school district
- Grades: K-12
- Superintendent: Brian Stone
- Schools: 4
- Budget: $23,751,000 (2020-21)
- NCES District ID: 1919140

Students and staff
- Students: 1446 (2022-23)
- Teachers: 113.35 FTE
- Staff: 120.02 FTE
- Student–teacher ratio: 12.76
- Athletic conference: River Valley Conference
- District mascot: Golden Hawks
- Colors: Gold and Black

Other information
- Website: www.mphawks.org

The Mid-Prairie Community School District is a rural public school district in southeastern Iowa, headquartered in Wellman, Iowa. The district spans areas of Washington, Iowa, and Johnson counties, and serves three communities and the surrounding area: Wellman, Kalona, and West Chester.

== Schools ==
=== Mid-Prairie High School ===
Mid-Prairie High School (MPHS) is located at 1634 Hwy 22, one mile east of Wellman, Iowa, approximately 18 miles south of Iowa City and 15 miles north of Washington. MPHS is a grades 9–12 high school with approximately 380 students.

The school colors are black and gold and the athletic teams are known as the Golden Hawks, and they compete in the River Valley Conference.

==== Athletics ====
- Baseball - 2004 State Champions
- Girls' basketball - 2002 State Champions
- Boys' track and field - 2008 Class 2A State Champions
- Boys' track and field - 2024 Wheelchair State Champions
- Boys' cross country - 2016 Class 2A State Champions

=== Mid-Prairie Middle School ===
Mid-Prairie Middle School is a grades 5–8 school located at 713 F Avenue in Kalona, Iowa, approximately 18 miles south of Iowa City and 15 miles north of Washington. Since the start of the 2017–18 school year this has been the only school in the district for grades 5–8, with approximately 440 students,

=== Mid-Prairie West Elementary ===
Mid-Prairie West Elementary is a K and grades 3 and 4 elementary school located at 800 6th Avenue Wellman, Iowa. The school was built in 1979.

=== Mid-Prairie East Elementary ===
Mid-Prairie East Elementary is a K-2 elementary school located at 702 6th Street Kalona, Iowa.

== See also ==
- List of school districts in Iowa
- List of high schools in Iowa
