= Harry Edward Stinson =

American sculptor (1898–1975)

Harry Edward Stinson (January 3, 1898 – July 27, 1975 in San Diego, California) was an American sculptor.

== Early life and education ==
Stinson was born on January 3, 1898 in Wayland, Iowa, and grew up in Winfield. In 1918, he enlisted in the US Army and was discharged in 1919. In 1920, he attended the University of Iowa, Iowa City and received his Bachelor of Arts degree in 1921. He studied art at the Cummings School of Art, Des Moines, Iowa, and then at the National Academy of Design, and Art Students League of New York between 1926 and 1928. In 1923, he was a resident painter member of The Louis Comfort Tiffany Foundation at Oyster Bay, Long Island, New York.

== Career ==
He traveled throughout Europe to study art in 1930 and then returned to the University of Iowa, where he, along with African American sculptor/printmaker Elizabeth Catlett, was one of the first in the nation to receive a Master of Fine Arts degree in 1940. While he was working toward this degree he participated in several WPA projects, which included a statue honoring Chief Blackhawk in 1934 at Crescent Park, Blackhawk Lake, Lakeside, Iowa; a memorial to Lewis and Clark, in 1936, in Council Bluffs, Iowa; and sculptured walls in the Iowa Union Building of the University of Iowa in 1940, honoring the sons and daughters of Iowa who served their country in military service. A model of the statue of Chief Blackhawk was exhibited in a place of honor in the Iowa Building at the Chicago Century of Progress Exposition. While in Iowa he worked with artists Grant Wood and Jean Charlot.

In 1941, he moved to New York City with his family of wife, Ruth Eby Stinson, and two daughters, Carolyn and Norma. He joined the faculty the Art Department at Hunter College of the City of New York. He joined the Clay Club in Greenwich Village to have a place to create his own works and the Clay Club later became the Sculpture Center on 69th Street in New York City. His sculptures evolved from wood and clay, to stone, to welded steel.

He has exhibited in such venues at the National Academy of Design and American Watercolor Society in New York City, and the Pennsylvania Academy of Fine Arts.
