= Seventy-Six Township, Washington County, Iowa =

Township in Washington County, Iowa, U.S.

Coordinates: 41.3742°N 91.8975°W

Seventy-Six Township is a township in Washington County, Iowa, United States.

== History ==
Seventy-Six Township was organized in 1856. It takes its name from the congressional township of which it forms a part.
