= Grissom High School (Alabama) =

Virgil I. Grissom High School

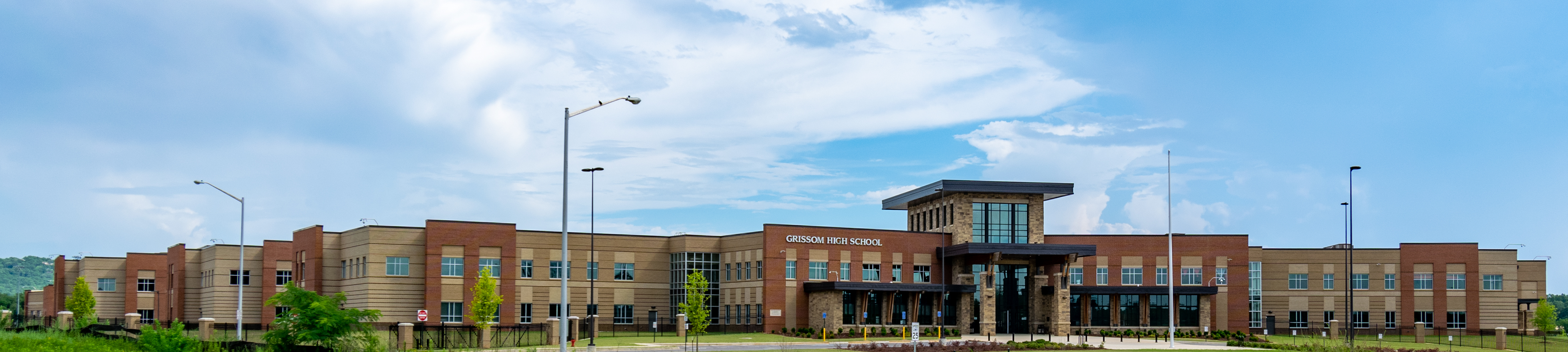

Location
- 1001 Haysland Road; Huntsville, Alabama 35802; United States; 34°38′34″N 86°34′36″W

Information
- Type: Public high school
- Motto: Latin: Id Facere Possumus (We can do it)
- Established: 1969 (57 years ago)
- School district: Huntsville City Schools
- CEEB code: 011466
- Principal: David Coker
- Teaching staff: 101.11 (FTE)
- Grades: 9–12
- Enrollment: 1,885 (2023–2024)
- Student to teacher ratio: 18.64
- Colors: Orange, brown, and white
- Nickname: GHS
- Team name: Grissom Tigers
- Accreditation: AdvancED
- Newspaper: Tiger Tale
- Yearbook: Invictus
- Website: www.huntsvillecityschools.org/o/ghs

Virgil I. Grissom High School, more commonly referred to as Grissom High School, is a public high school in Huntsville, Alabama, United States with approximately 2000 students in grades 9–12 from Southeast Huntsville. The school was named a 2007 Blue Ribbon School by the U.S. Department of Education. In the Newsweek ranking of schools throughout the nation in 2015, Grissom High School was ranked second-best in the state and 390th nationally.

== History ==
Grissom High School was founded in 1969 and is named for astronaut Virgil I. "Gus" Grissom, killed in the Apollo 1 fire at Cape Kennedy, Florida on January 27, 1967. Huntsville is home to NASA's Marshall Space Flight Center and has extensive ties to the American space program. At the same time, the Huntsville City Schools named Roger B. Chaffee Elementary and Ed White Middle School for Grissom's fallen Apollo 1 crewmates.

In August 2012, the Huntsville City Schools announced plans to tear down the original two-story main high school building and replace it with a three-story structure at an estimated cost of $58 million. The new building was opened for the 2017–18 school year.

Tom Drake served as Grissom's principal from 2000 through August 2013. The school board named June Kalange, then a vice-principal and former science teacher at Grissom, as his replacement in early August 2013. In 2015, Rebecca Balentine, the then-principal of Jones Valley Elementary School, was announced as the new principal of the school. She served until the end of the 2017–2018 school year. Her successor was Grissom Alumni Jeanne Greer, she served until the 2022-2023 school year. In the 2023-2024 school year she was succeeded by Grissom High Alumni David Coker.

== Academic achievement ==
In 2007, Newsweek magazine ranked Grissom among the top 5% of all high schools in the United States. The school was ranked 531 among the top 1200 high schools in the nation based on the number of Advanced Placement, Cambridge tests, and/or International Baccalaureate tests taken by all students at a school and then dividing by the number of graduating seniors. In the Newsweek ranking of schools throughout the nation for 2015, Grissom High School was ranked second-best in the state and 390th nationally. Grissom was the only high school in Huntsville to make the 2015 list.

Grissom produced 28 National Merit Semifinalists for 2007, the highest number in the state. Grissom's math teams and academic team have also earned national recognition. Grissom's 2007 Science Olympiad state team placed 2nd at the state competition at Samford University. They participated in the National Science Olympiad competition in Kansas in May 2007, and in 2008 participated in the National competition in Augusta, Georgia. In 2008, Grissom's Debate and Speech Team qualified for, and competed in the NFL National Tournament in Las Vegas, Nevada.

== Notable people ==
=== Notable alumni ===
- Mo Brooks, class of 1972, congressman in the U.S. House of Representatives, representing Alabama's 5th congressional district
- Michael E. Brown, class of 1983, professor of planetary astronomy at California Institute of Technology
- Stephen Cash, class of 1977, collegiate football player, aerospace engineer, and director of the Marshall Space Flight Center
- Justin Foscue, class of 2017, 14th overall pick in the 2020 MLB draft
- Yaa Gyasi, class of 2007, author
- John E. Hyten, class of 1977, Vice Chairman of the Joint Chiefs of Staff (Designee)
- JJ Kaplan, class of 2016, American-Israeli basketball player in the Israeli Basketball Premier League
- James Lomax, class of 2010, member of the Alabama House of Representatives
- Spike McRoy, class of 1986, former professional golfer on the PGA Tour and Nationwide Tour
- Hunter Morris, class of 2007, All-American collegiate baseball player
- Marvin Stone, class of 1999, professional basketball player
- Tim Stowers, class of 1976, head football coach at Georgia Southern University
- Jayson Swain, class of 2003, formerly a wide receiver for the Chicago Bears
- Jon Sumrall, class of 2001, head football coach at the University of Florida
- Hans von Spakovsky, class of 1977, member of The Heritage Foundation
- David Howard Thornton, class of 1998, actor
- Peter J. White, class of 2001, senior policy advisor to President Donald Trump

=== Notable faculty ===
- Jeremy Brown, teacher, baseball coach, 35th overall pick in the 2002 Major League Baseball draft
- Kay Cornelius, author

== Advanced Placement classes ==
Grissom High School offers Advanced Placement Program courses in the following courses, including, but not limited to:

- American Government & Politics
- Biology
- Calculus (AB & BC)
- Chemistry
- Comparative Government & Politics
- Computer science
- English Language & Composition
- English Literature & Composition
- Environmental Science
- European History
- French language
- German language
- Human Geography
- Latin language
- Microeconomics
- Psychology
- Spanish language
- Statistics
- Studio Art
- United States History

Students from Grissom can participate in a dual enrollment program and take classes at Calhoun Community College, the University of Alabama in Huntsville, and the University of Alabama in Tuscaloosa through correspondence.

== Extracurriculars and athletics ==
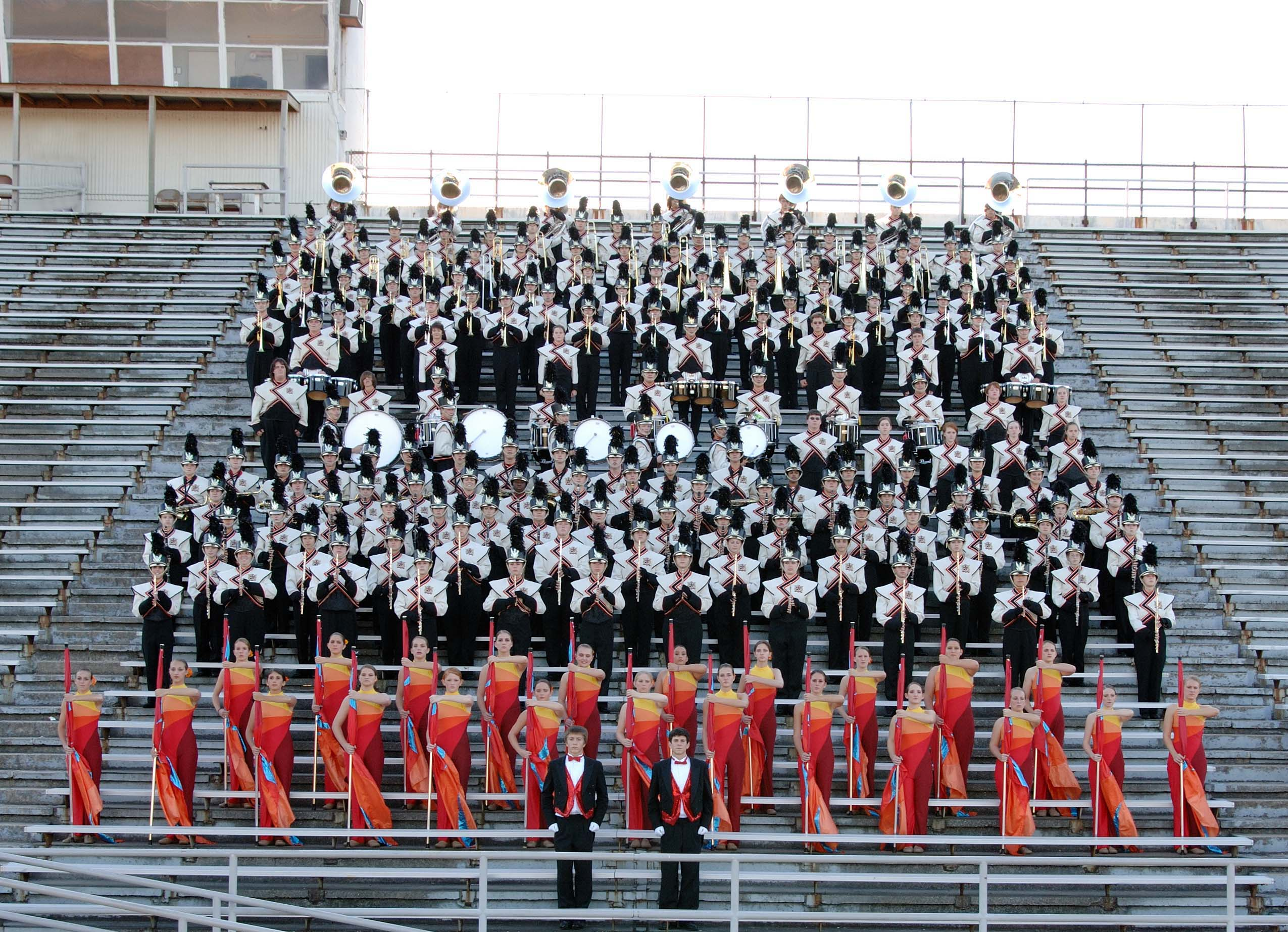
Grissom Band 2006–07

As of 2007, Grissom has football, boys' and girls' basketball, volleyball, baseball, cross country, softball, track, golf, swimming and diving, boys' and girls' soccer, boys' and girls' tennis, wrestling, and cheerleading teams, a dance program, a choral program, a theatre program, Greenpower team, Robotics team, as well as marching, symphonic, and jazz bands. Other notable extracurricular activities include an academic team and an extremely competitive math team, that in addition to competing in contests, runs numerous mathematics programs, camps, and competitions. Rocket City Math League is an international mathematics competition run by Grissom math team students. A wide variety of extracurricular clubs are also present at Grissom.

Grissom's academic team has won nine Alabama UAB/Alabama Scholastic Competition Association (ASCA) state championships (1982 (4A), 1987 (5A-6A), 1991, 1998, 2000, 2001, 2003, 2004, and 2013 (the state's inaugural Junior Varsity Championship)) – the most of any Alabama high school.

Grissom's wrestling team has won seven AHSAA State Championships, and has been runner-up seven times as well. Its most recent state championship was in 2004, while its most recent runner-up placement was in 2012. The program has also developed many individual state champions.

Grissom's Greenpower Team has won numerous awards. In the Toyota Classic race in 2021, they won 3rd place in Stock and 2nd place in Modified, and in 2022, 3rd place in Stock and 1st in Modified. In addition, they placed 2nd in Modified and 1st in Stock at the F24 National Championship race, later in 2022 they placed 1st in both Modified and Stock. Also in 2022 they placed 2nd in Stock in the Santa Sprits race. In 2023 they won 1st place Stock in the Trojan 90's race.

=== School publications ===
Grissom's bimonthly newspaper is The Imprint, which is recognized by the Alabama Scholastic Press Association. The annual literary magazine is called Seed, and the annual school yearbook is named Invictus.

== See also ==
- List of high schools in Alabama
