= Brighton Township, Washington County, Iowa =

Township in Washington County, Iowa, U.S.

Coordinates: 41.2100°N 91.7692°W

Brighton Township is a township in Washington County, Iowa, United States.

== History ==
Brighton Township was organized in 1845.
