= Crooked Creek (Skunk River tributary) =

Stream in Iowa, U.S.

Coordinates: 41°09′31″N 91°43′06″W

Crooked Creek is a stream in the U.S. state of Iowa. It is a tributary to the Skunk River. It splits into an East Fork and West Fork in Washington County.
