= List of the oldest buildings in Iowa =

This article lists the oldest extant buildings in Iowa, including extant buildings and structures constructed during pre-statehood period of Iowa history. Only buildings built prior to 1850 are suitable for inclusion on this list, or the building must be the oldest of its type.

In order to qualify for the list, a structure must:

- be a recognizable building (defined as any human-made structure used or intended for supporting or sheltering any use or continuous occupancy);
- incorporate features of building work from the claimed date to at least 1.5 metres (4.9 ft) in height and/or be a listed building.

This consciously excludes ruins of limited height, roads and statues. Bridges may be included if they otherwise fulfill the above criteria. Dates for many of the oldest structures have been arrived at by radiocarbon dating or dendrochronology and should be considered approximate. If the exact year of initial construction is estimated, it will be shown as a range of dates.

== List of oldest buildings ==
Building	Image	Location	First built	Use	Notes
Louis Arriandeaux Log House		Dubuque, Iowa	ca. 1827	Residence	Oldest house in Iowa. Located on the grounds of the Mathias Ham House
Stringtown House		Davis County, Iowa	1832	Residence	Oldest house in Davis County
Claim House		Davenport, Iowa	ca. 1832-1833	Residence	Oldest building in Davenport
Rhodham Bonnifield House		Fairfield, Iowa	1838	Residence	
St. Anthony's Catholic Church (Davenport, Iowa)		Davenport, Iowa	1838	Church	Oldest church building in use in Iowa
Alexander Brownlie House		Long Grove, Iowa	1839	Residence	
Paton and Hannah Wilson House		Salem, Iowa	1839	Residence	
Rhoda Smalley House		Muscatine, Iowa	ca. 1839	Residence	
I.O.O.F. Hall		Bentonsport, Iowa	ca. 1840s	Fraternity Hall	
Abiathar and Nancy White House		Burlington, Iowa	ca. 1840	Residence	Largest Federal-style building in Burlington
Alexander Young Cabin		Washington, Iowa	ca. 1840	Residence	
Cowles House		Bentonsport, Iowa	ca. 1840	Residence	
Henderson Lewelling House		Salem, Iowa	1840	Residence	
Kuhl House		Iowa City, Iowa	1840	Residence	Now home to University Press at University of Iowa
Fort Atkinson		Fort Atkinson, Iowa	ca. 1840-1842	Military Fort	
Beers and St. John Company Coach Inn		near West Liberty, Iowa	1842	Inn	
Iowa Old Capitol Building		Iowa City, Iowa	1842	Government	
James Brown House		Riverdale, Iowa	1842	Residence	
Lee County Courthouse		Fort Madison, Iowa	1842	Government	
Stone Academy		Solon, Iowa	1842	School	
Collins-Bond House		Salem, Iowa	1843	Residence	
James Nealey House		Muscatine, Iowa	ca. 1843	Residence	
Potter's Mill		Bellevue, Iowa	1843	Commercial/ Mill	
Thomas F. and Nancy Tuttle House		Pella, Iowa	1843	Residence	Oldest building in Pella
Van Buren County Courthouse		Keosauqua, Iowa	1843	Courthouse	
Aunty Green Hotel		Bonaparte, Iowa	1844	Residence	
Moyce–Steffens House		Fort Madison, Iowa	1844	Residence	
Plum Grove		Iowa City, Iowa	1844	Residence	
Franklin Pearson House		Keosauqua, Iowa	1845	Residence	
Jackson County Courthouse		Bellevue, Iowa	1845	Courthouse	
Theodore Niemann House		Jackson, County, Iowa	1845	Residence	
William Fordney House		Burlington, Iowa	1845	Residence	
Windrem House		Iowa City, Iowa	ca. 1845-1850	Residence	
Gehlen House and Barn		Muscatine, Iowa	ca. 1846	Residence and barn	Iowa's oldest barn
Couch-Carskaddan House		Muscatine, Iowa	ca. 1846	Residence	
Larnerd Case House		Des Moines, Iowa	1846	Residence	
Mason House Inn		Bentonsport, Iowa	1846	Residence/ Inn	
Paradise Farm		Bellevue, Iowa	1846	Residence	
Taylor–Van Note House		Cedar Rapids, Iowa	1846	Residence	
Baptist Church		Sperry, Iowa	1847	Church	
Buffalo Bill Cody Homestead		Butler Township, Scott County, Iowa	1847	Residence	
Hancock House		Bentonsport, Iowa	1847	Residence	
Jacob Wentz House		Iowa City, Iowa	1847	Residence	
Ambrose Fulton Log Cabin		Davenport, Iowa	1848	Residence	
Dominie Henry P. Scholte House		Pella, Iowa	1848	Residence	
Isaac R. and Charlotte Mauck House		Muscatine, Iowa	ca. 1848	Residence	
Jesse and Mary Farley House		Dubuque, Iowa	ca. 1848	Residence	
Jonathan Clark Conger House		Washington, Iowa	ca. 1848	Residence	
Lynnville Mill and Dam		Lynnville, Iowa	1848	Commercial/ Mill	
Pine Creek Gristmill		Muscatine County, Iowa	1848	Commercial, Mill	
Pioneer Log Cabin		Newton, Iowa	1848	Residence	
Spring Side		Bellevue, Iowa	1848	Residence	
Gen. Samuel R. Curtis House		Keokuk, Iowa	1849	Residence	
Lamm-Pollmiller Farmstead		Salem, Iowa	ca. 1849	Residence	
Rose Hill		Iowa City, Iowa	1849	Residence	
Upper Paradise		Bellevue, Iowa	1849	Residence	
Western Hotel		Holy Cross, Iowa	ca. 1849-1850	Residence	

== See also ==
- National Register of Historic Places listings in Iowa
- History of Iowa
- Oldest buildings in the United States
