= William Jones (Welsh radical) =

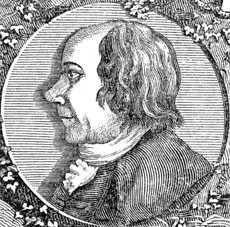
- Born: 1726; Llangadfan, Wales
- Died: 20 August 1795 (aged 68–69); Llangadfan, Wales
- Occupations: farmer, scholar

William Jones (christened 18 June 1726 – 20 August 1795) was a Welsh antiquary, poet, scholar and radical. Jones was an ardent supporter of both the American and French Revolutions – his strong support of the Patriot and Jacobin causes earned him the nicknames "the rural Voltaire", the "Welsh Voltaire", and accusations of being, "a rank Republican and a Leveller". Despite his vocal support for foreign revolutions, however, Jones never advocated a violent Welsh republican uprising against the House of Hanover and instead encouraged the Welsh people to emigrate en masse to "The Promised Land"; in the newly founded United States.

Like many subsequent Welsh nationalists, however, Jones also held very strong anti-English sentiments. He often expressed an intense hostility to the completely Anglicised Welsh nobility, their policies of rackrenting, and their employment of land agents whom he considered, "destitute of the principles of justice [and] moral honesty". Similarly to Saunders Lewis, Jones was equally enraged by the increasing language loss among lower class Welsh people, which led to one contemporary to describe Jones as "the hottest arsed" Welshman he had ever met.

== Early history ==
Jones was born in 1726 to William Sion Dafydd and his second wife Catherine. His father was a guard on the coach that ran between Machynlleth in Wales and Shrewsbury in England, though he also farmed at Dôl Hywel in Llangadfan in Montgomeryshire. Jones' mother, on the other hand, had been raised within the illegal and underground Catholic Church in Wales prior to the Titus Oates plot. Jones learned many works of Catholic oral poetry in the Welsh language, many of them rooted in the spirituality of the Celtic Church, from his mother and was later to write them down and preserve them for posterity. Despite his later preaching of the glory of emigration to the United States, Jones lived his whole life in Llangadfan. He was christened into the Anglican Communion at the parish church alleged to have been founded by Saint Cadfan on 18 June 1726, and the only formal education he received was at one of Griffith Jones' schools that existed for a time in the neighbourhood. He was mainly a self-taught autodidact, was raised as a Welsh speaker and learnt Welsh English only as a second language. His written English was said to be very good, though he spoke the language with great difficulty. He also learnt Latin, and translated verse by Horace and Ovid into Welsh poetry. As well as the classics, Jones promoted the ideas of the French Philosophe Voltaire in Welsh; in the view of David Barnes in his book The Companion Guide to Wales, this "succeeded in influencing the political development of his country".

Jones was married to Ann, and they had a son and two daughters. His wife suffered terribly from pains of the body and was confined to her bed for the last 15 years of her life.

== Antiquary ==
Jones began to correspond with the Gwyneddigion Society, and with other contemporary men of letters, and began collecting and recording local folk songs and country dances for Edward Jones (Bardd y Brenin), the King's Bard. Jones spent much time conversing with the elderly members of his community as well as researching manuscripts and printed collections which provided Edward Jones with valuable material for his printed volumes. He describes many of the dances as having "sharp twists and turns rendering them fiendishly difficult to perform well", and stated that they were probably "too fatiguing for the bodies and minds of the present generation, and requiring much skill and activity in the performance".

He also collected Welsh oral poetry and made notes on their metrical rules for Owain Myfyr. Jones also began to research and collect the genealogies of the old Welsh families. His descriptions of the parishes of Llangadfan, Llanerfyl and Garth-beibio were published by Gwallter Mechain in a 1796 issue of the Cambrian Register.

=== Madog ab Owain Gwynedd ===
In Welsh literary circles during the 18th century, the Elizabethan era pseudohistory of Madog ab Owain Gwynedd provided a defense for the House of Tudor to begin their own colonisation of the New World. The belief existed that Madog, son of Owain Gwynedd, had travelled to North America in the 12th-century and had planted a colony whose descendants, the Madogwys (Padoucas), still spoke the Welsh language. This myth was extremely attractive to Jones, and the publication of John Williams' 1791 work An Enquiry into the Truth of the Tradition, Concerning the Discovery of America, by Prince Madog ab Owen Gwynedd, about the Year, 1170 sent the members of the Gwyneddigion Society into a frenzy of excitement. Jones took this myth even further, alleging that Madog, or some of his followers, had travelled further south and discovered both Mexico and the Inca Empire. Stating that 'Mango Capae' (Manco Cápac), the legendary first Sapa Inca was either a descendant or Madog himself, claiming that 'Mango Capae' was an easy transition to 'Madog ap'.

== Radicalism ==
Through his research into Welsh history, Jones became more curious about his nation's past, and decided to rescue Welsh literature, history, and culture from the "neglect and condescension of well-meaning antiquarians and blinkered enthusiasts". His views became more and more radical and more nationalistic over time; he came to dismiss early Welsh historians such as Geoffrey of Monmouth, whose writings he described as "foolish fictions". Jones was especially hostile in his writings towards English and Scottish historians who he believed "through prejudice or ignorance, seldom do us justice in their records". He focused such criticisms on Lord Lyttelton, William Robertson and Tobias Smollett, who Jones argued were hostile to the various Welsh princes and failed to "mention... the neglect, spoliation and contempt which the Welsh had been obliged to suffer in the pre-Tudor period." He acknowledged that his chloleric temper, which Jones' political enemies described as the "Welsh Feaver", influenced the fierce anti-English sentiments in his writings. His Welsh nationalist feelings were appreciated by many of his countrymen, and one of his contemporaries admiringly described Jones as "the hottest arsed Welshman" he had ever known.

Jones also fought for a separate national identity for Wales, and in reaction to the Englishness of the British patriotic songs God save the King, The Roast Beef of Old England and Rule, Britannia!, he set about composing a national anthem for Wales. The song he hoped would be sung at meetings and societies across the country. The anthem, sung to the refrain, "Ac unwn lawen ganiad ar doriad teg y dydd" (And join in joyful song at the fair break of dawn), was designed to commemorate "our viscitudes (sic) of Fortune". Jones made great play of the treachery and pillage wrought by the Roman conquest, the "treacherous" Vortigern, "that tyrant" Edward I and "the usurper" Henry IV. It is believed that this is the first attempt to produce a national anthem for Wales in Modern history. As well as an anthem, Jones also advocated the creation of both a national library and the National Eisteddfod of Wales.

At its core, however, Jones' nationalism was fuelled by the social and economic changes that were affecting Wales, which he felt boded ill for Welsh tenant farmers. Since the 1770s, long term leases that once lasted generations, were being replaced by annual tenancies which allowed land owners to raise the rent to increasingly excessive levels from year to year. As early as December 1786 he had written to his landlord Sir Watkin Williams-Wynn, rebuking him for employing land agents who were 'destitute of the principles of justice [and] moral honesty' and comparing Williams-Wynn unfavourably to his father. By the 1790s Jones held a belief that the Anglicised Welsh landlords, through the employment of unscrupulous agents, had forfeited the rights to expect the unquestioning obedience of their tenants, as the traditional code of conduct under Welsh law had been violated. In writings reminiscent of his hero Voltaire, he declared that society was composed of 'Shearers' and 'Feeders', 'Oppressors' and 'Slaves'. As an open supporter of the American Revolution and later the French Revolution, the Whig-controlled government viewed Jones as a dangerous political dissident, "a Rank republican and a Leveller". Orders were made to open and examine his mail, and government intelligence officers were ordered to keep him under surveillance.

His views on a broken society, under what he described as William Pitt's "reign of terror" led him to advocate that broken Welsh tenant farmers should leave Wales and emigrate to the United States. At the Llanrwst eisteddfod in June 1791 Jones distributed copies of an address, titled 'To all Indigenous Cambro-Britons', calling for tenant farmers and impoverished craftsmen to pack their bags, quit Wales and sail to the 'Promised Land' in the newly founded United States. When Jones heard in 1792 that Sir William Pulteney had purchased large tracts of land in New York, he wrote to him expressing his desire to see the creation of a Welsh colony on this estate. However, Jones did not endear himself to Pulteney by referring to the "insatiable avarice of the landowners", calling them "Egyptian taskmasters". Pulteney's very negative response to Jones countered that the farmers of Britain lived in the most "bounteous country in the world" and that if they improved their cultivation methods and became more industrious, then they would prosper.

Undeterred, Jones then contacted Thomas Pinckney, the American ambassador in London, asking him to lend support in a plan to establish a joint-stock company to survey suitable land in Kentucky and Pennsylvania where a large number of Welsh settlers could establish a new state, whose affairs would be conducted in the Welsh language. Pinckney rebuffed the idea. Despite Jones' desires to see a Welsh colony in America, he himself never emigrated, illness and poverty preventing him from travelling. Neither did his dream of a Welsh colony come to fruition, though his idea of an independent Welsh homeland in America was an important influence on Edward Bebb and Eziekel Hughes, two of the foremost Welsh emigrants who settled in Ohio in the 1790s.

== Later life and health ==
Jones had long been a herbalist and had succeeded in curing himself of scrofula. He circulated advertisements which proclaimed his ability for healing not only scrofula but also "Fistulous and running ulcers, the Fistula Lachrymalis and other disorders of the eyes, glandulous tumours, aedematous and dropsical swellings, white swellings of the joints, rheumatick, fixt and wandering Pains". He had planned to publish a book of household remedies; however, these plans, and his career as a healer, were cut short by the Medicine Duties Act 1785 (25 Geo. 3. c. 79), which obliged him to apply for a licence to operate as a doctor.

In his later life Jones was a sorry figure. The lease on Dolhywel had expired, his rent had trebled, and his long-suffering daughter left home to get married. The local absentee Anglican Vicar, Dr. Matthew Worthington, believing Jones to be a volatile radical, reportedly did all in his power to turn the local people against him. Jones died in 1795 at the age of 69. He was buried, at his own insistence, in unconsecrated ground in St Cadfan's parish churchyard.

== Bibliography ==
- Lloyd, John Edward; Jenkins, R.T. (1958). The Dictionary of Welsh Biography, Down to 1940. Cardiff: William Lewis.
- Roberts, Enid Pierce. "JONES, WILLIAM (1726 - 1795), antiquary and poet". Dictionary of Welsh Biography. National Library of Wales and the University of Wales Centre for Advanced Welsh and Celtic Studies.
