= Bonnifield =

Bonnifield is a surname. Notable people with the surname include:

- McKaskia Stearns Bonnifield (1833–1913), justice of the Supreme Court of Nevada
- Rhodham Bonnifield, builder of the Rhodham Bonnifield House, a nationally recognized historic place in Fairfield, Iowa
- William Bonnifield (1814–1875), Mayor of Kansas City, Missouri
