= Western Hotel =

Western Hotel may refer to:

in the United States (by state)

- Western Hotel (Glenwood Springs, Colorado)
- Western Hotel (Ouray, Colorado)
- Western Hotel (Holy Cross, Iowa), listed on the NRHP in Iowa
- Western Hotel (Lynchburg, Virginia), listed on the NRHP in Virginia
- Western Hotel (Lancaster, California), listed as a California Historical Landmark
- Western Hotel (Sacramento), listed as a California Historical Landmark
