= Larnerd Case House =

Historic house in Iowa, United States

- U.S. National Register of Historic Places
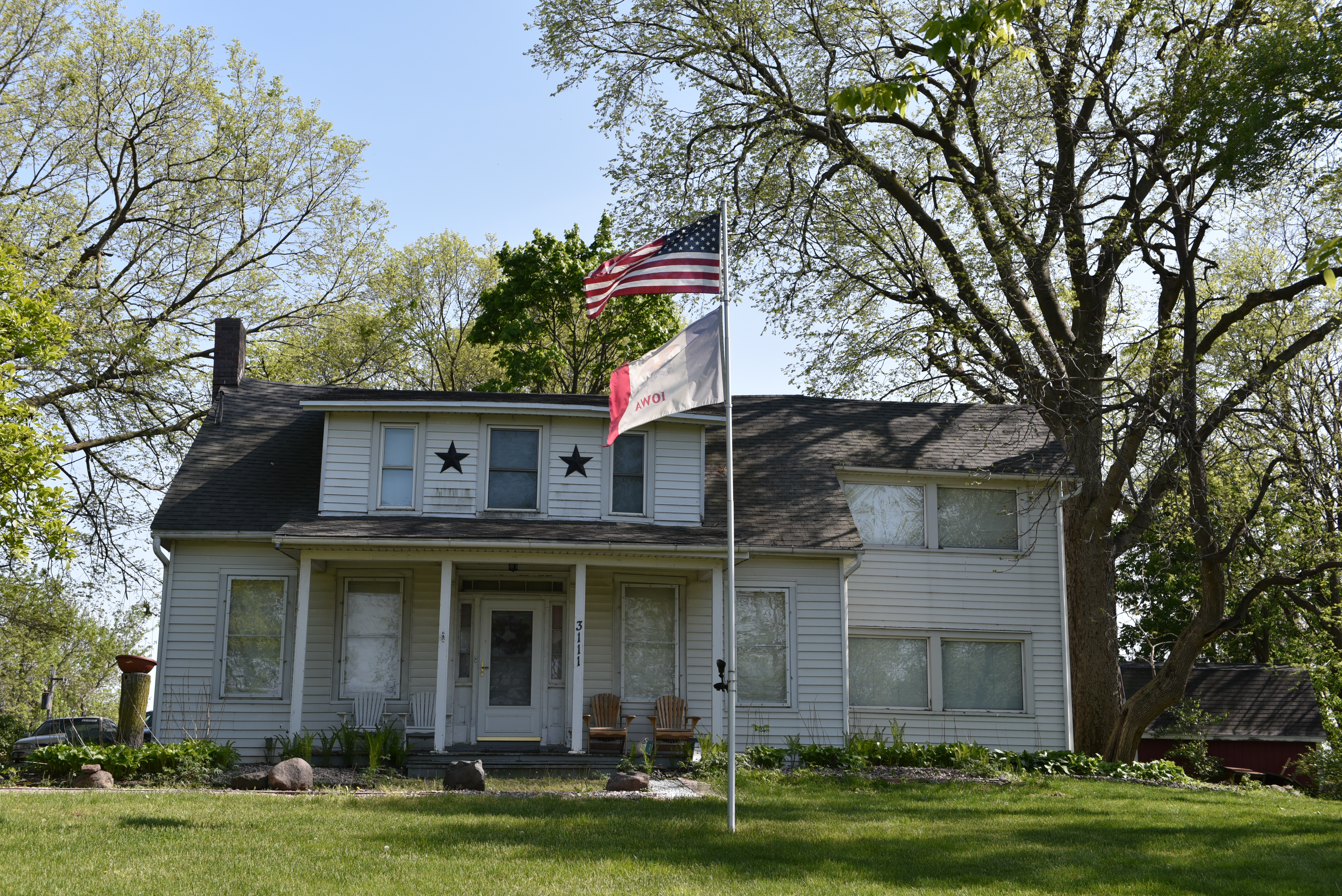

- Location within Iowa Location within the United States
- Location: 3111 Easton Blvd. Des Moines, Iowa
- Coordinates: 41°36′38.7″N 93°33′22.5″W
- Area: 2.5 acres (1.0 ha)
- Built: 1846
- Built by: Larnerd Case
- Architectural style: Greek Revival
- NRHP reference No.: 82002633
- Added to NRHP: June 21, 1982

The Larnerd Case House, also known as Rose Hill, is a historic building located in Des Moines, Iowa, United States. This two-story, frame, Greek Revival structure is the oldest dwelling that is still standing in the city. The second floor dormer and the front porch are not original to the house. This section of Iowa was opened for settlement in 1845 after a treaty with the Sauk and Meskwaki (Fox) tribes. Larnerd Case, an Ohio native, built this house using black walnut cut from the property in 1846. He lived on what was then a 160-acre (65 ha) farm until his death in 1857. The residential area that surrounds the house and the park across the street were once part of the farm. The house was listed on the National Register of Historic Places in 1982.

== See also ==
- List of the oldest buildings in Iowa
