= Baptist Church (Sperry, Iowa) =

- U.S. National Register of Historic Places
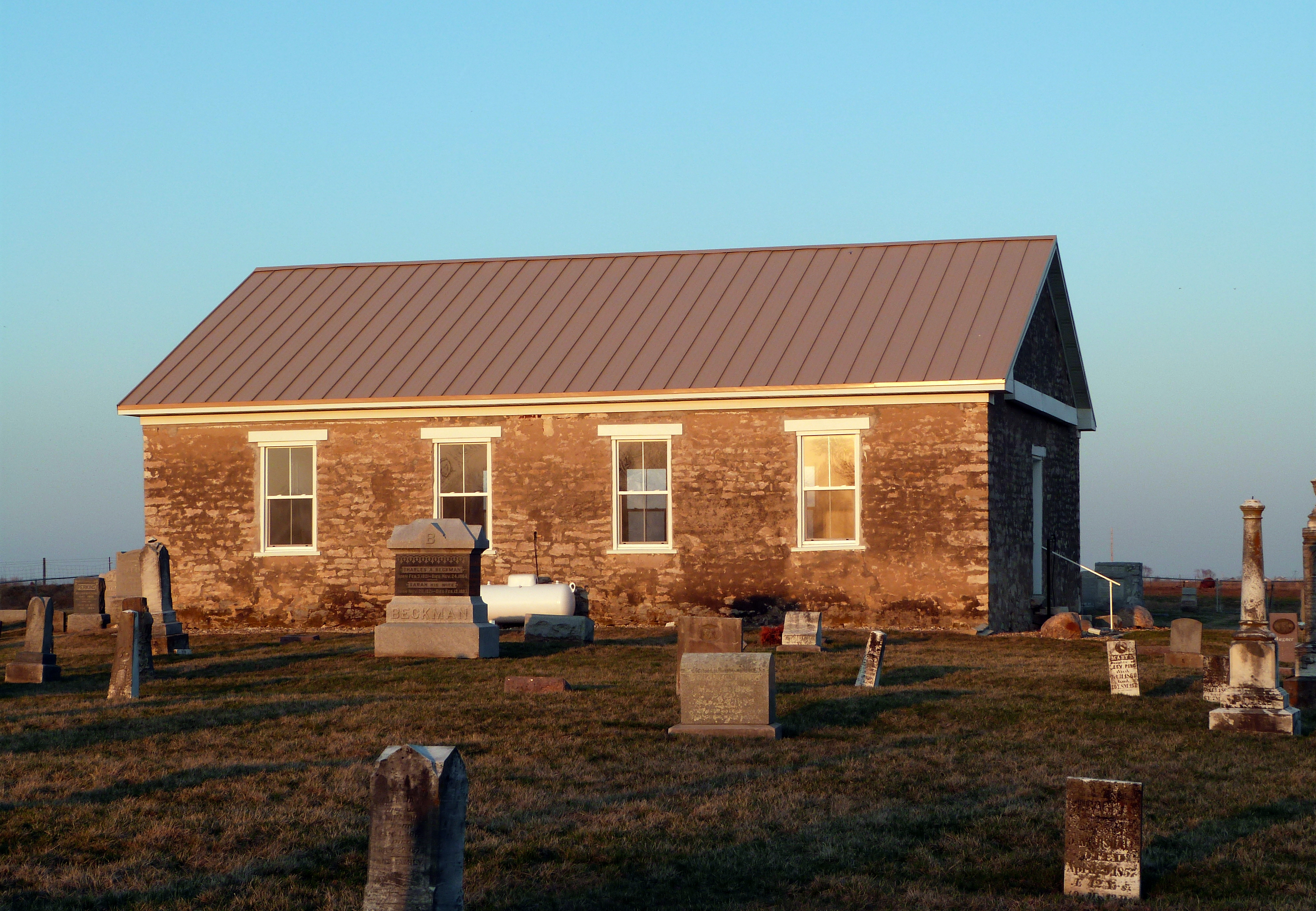
- The Baptist Church in 2013.

- Location within Iowa Location within the United States
- Location: West of Sperry off U.S. Route 61
- Coordinates: 40°57′30″N 91°11′56″W
- Area: less than one acre
- Built: 1847
- NRHP reference No.: 77000509
- Added to NRHP: April 18, 1977

Baptist Church, also known as Stone Church, is a historic church building in Sperry, Iowa, United States. The Baptist congregation that built this church was founded in 1840. They built this building seven years later. In addition to religious services, it was the meeting place for a variety of community events. The church building is surrounded by a cemetery, which contains the graves of some of the areas first settlers. The utilitarian design of the church building and the use of local materials is characteristic of pioneer church architecture in Iowa. The 48-by-36-foot (15 by 11 m) building is a single-story, gable roof structure. It features a cornice return. The roughly cut stone exterior uses larger stones at the corners for a decorative effect. The interior walls are plaster and the flooring are pine boards. It still houses the original hardwood pews, pulpit, minister's settee, and hand-carved altar. The building was damaged in a tornado in 1964, and the repairs conform to the original character of the church. It was added to the National Register in 1977.
