= Lynnville Mill and Dam =

- U.S. National Register of Historic Places
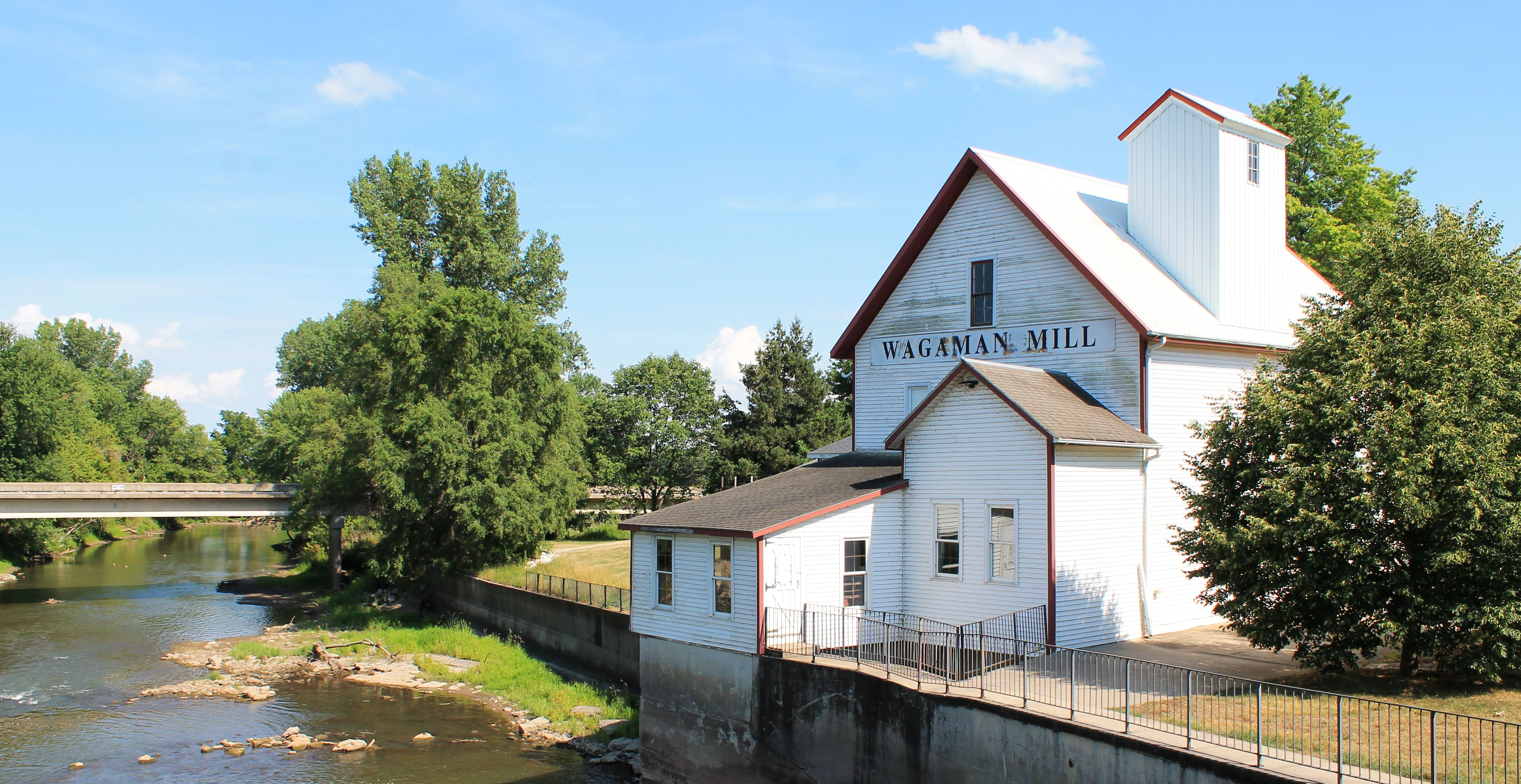

- Location within Iowa Location within the United States
- Location: East St. Lynnville, Iowa
- Coordinates: 41°34′50″N 92°46′58″W
- Area: 2 acres (0.81 ha)
- Built: 1848, 1868
- Built by: John Sparks
- NRHP reference No.: 77000522
- Added to NRHP: November 25, 1977

The Lynnville Mill and Dam, also known as Wagaman Mill, is a historic complex located in Lynnville, Iowa, United States. John Sparks relocated from Lee County to Jasper County in 1845. That year he began building a small paddle-wheel saw mill, which was completed the following year. In 1847 he began the construction of a grist mill, which he finished in 1848. This was the first mill in Jasper County. Jesse Arnold, who bought the mill in 1852, and his son Joseph replaced the paddle-wheel with a vertical drive hydraulic turbine in 1868. W.K. Wagaman bought the mill in 1898 and modernized the machinery, and his son Fred installed the concrete dam, and added an additional turbine and a wheel house in 1918–1919. He discontinued the grinding of wheat, which was no longer profitable, and focused on the production of animal feed, corn meal, and electricity. Fred's son Harris (Huck) took over the mill in 1946, and in 1958 completely electrified the operation. The Jasper County Conservation Board began restoring the wheel house of the mill to its original operating condition in 1973. The mill was listed on the National Register of Historic Places in 1977. The Lynnville Historical Society began repairing the mill building in 1998.
