= Edward J. Bebb =

American soldier

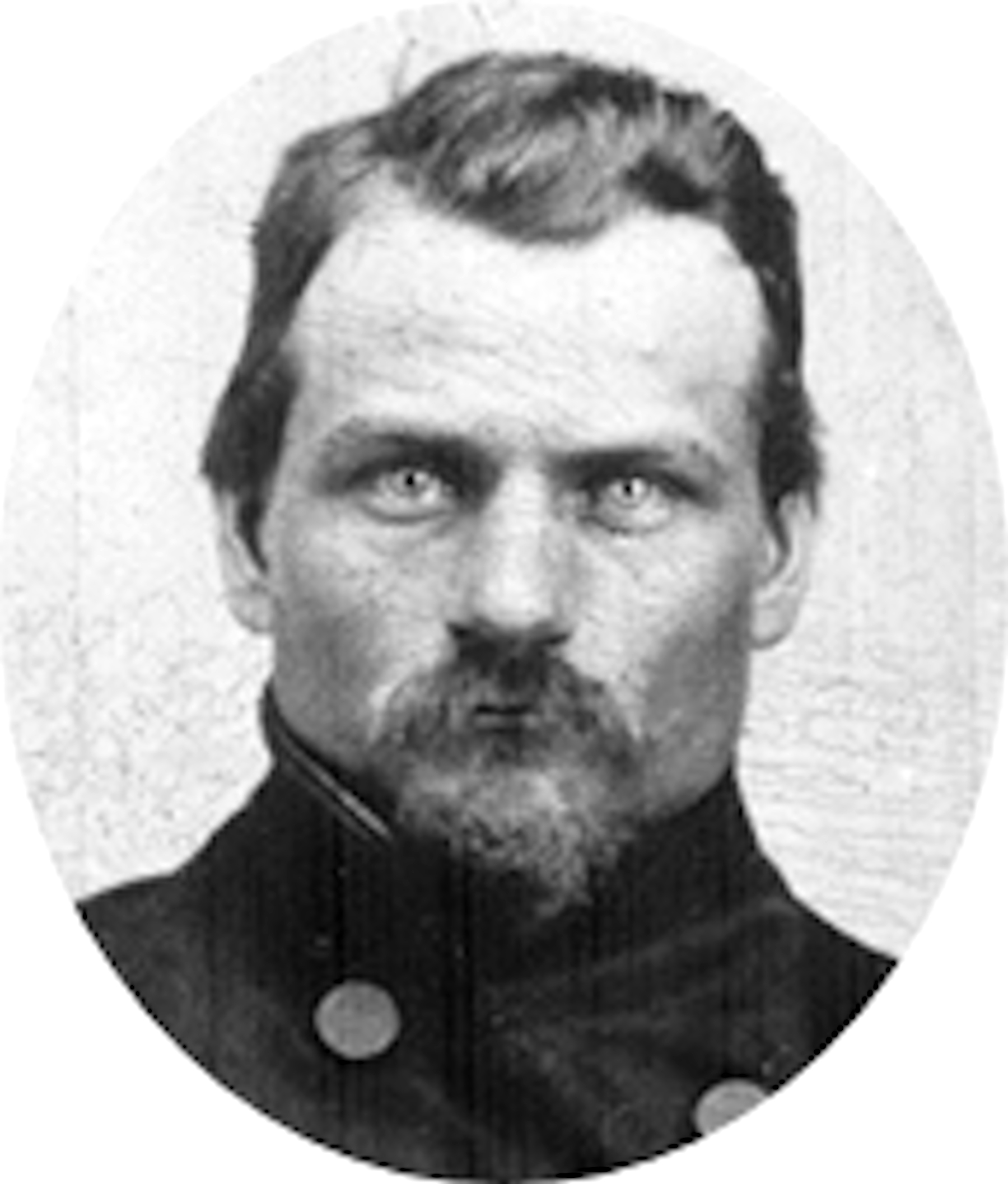
- Born: April 28, 1839; Butler County, Ohio
- Died: July 12, 1916 (aged 77); Marshalltown, Iowa
- Burial place: New Salem Cemetery, Lynnville, Iowa
- Military career
- Allegiance: United States of America
- Branch: United States Army
- Service years: 1861 - 1865
- Rank: Private
- Unit: 4th Regiment Iowa Volunteer Cavalry
- Conflicts: bridge over the Chattahoochee River
- Awards: Medal of Honor

Edward J. Bebb (April 28, 1839 – July 12, 1916) was an American soldier who fought in the American Civil War. Bebb was awarded the country's highest award for bravery during combat, the Medal of Honor, for his action in Columbus, Georgia on April 16, 1865. He was honored with the award on June 17, 1865.

== Biography ==
Bebb was born in Ohio to Edward (1800 - 1868) and Margaret Evans Bebb (1805 - 1868) on April 28, 1839. He moved to Iowa at age 12. Bebb enlisted into Company D of the 4th Iowa Cavalry on September 25, 1861 and was a private throughout his military career. On 16 April 1865 he formed part of a regiment, under the direction of General J. H. Wilson's, that were undertaking to capture the Chattahoochee River bridge to gain entry into the city. Bebb is reported to have captured a flag while the enemies were fleeing. He was awarded the Medal of Honor for his valor at this event.

== Medal of Honor citation ==
Capture of flag.

== Personal life ==
Bebb married Mary Adeline Hungerford (1845 - 1900) in Wapello, Iowa on March 8, 1866 having mustered out of the army soon after the conclusion of the Civil War.

== See also ==
- List of American Civil War Medal of Honor recipients: A–F
