= Des Moines River Locks No. 5 and No. 7 =

- Des Moines River Locks; No. 5 and No. 7
- U.S. National Register of Historic Places
- U.S. Historic district – Contributing property
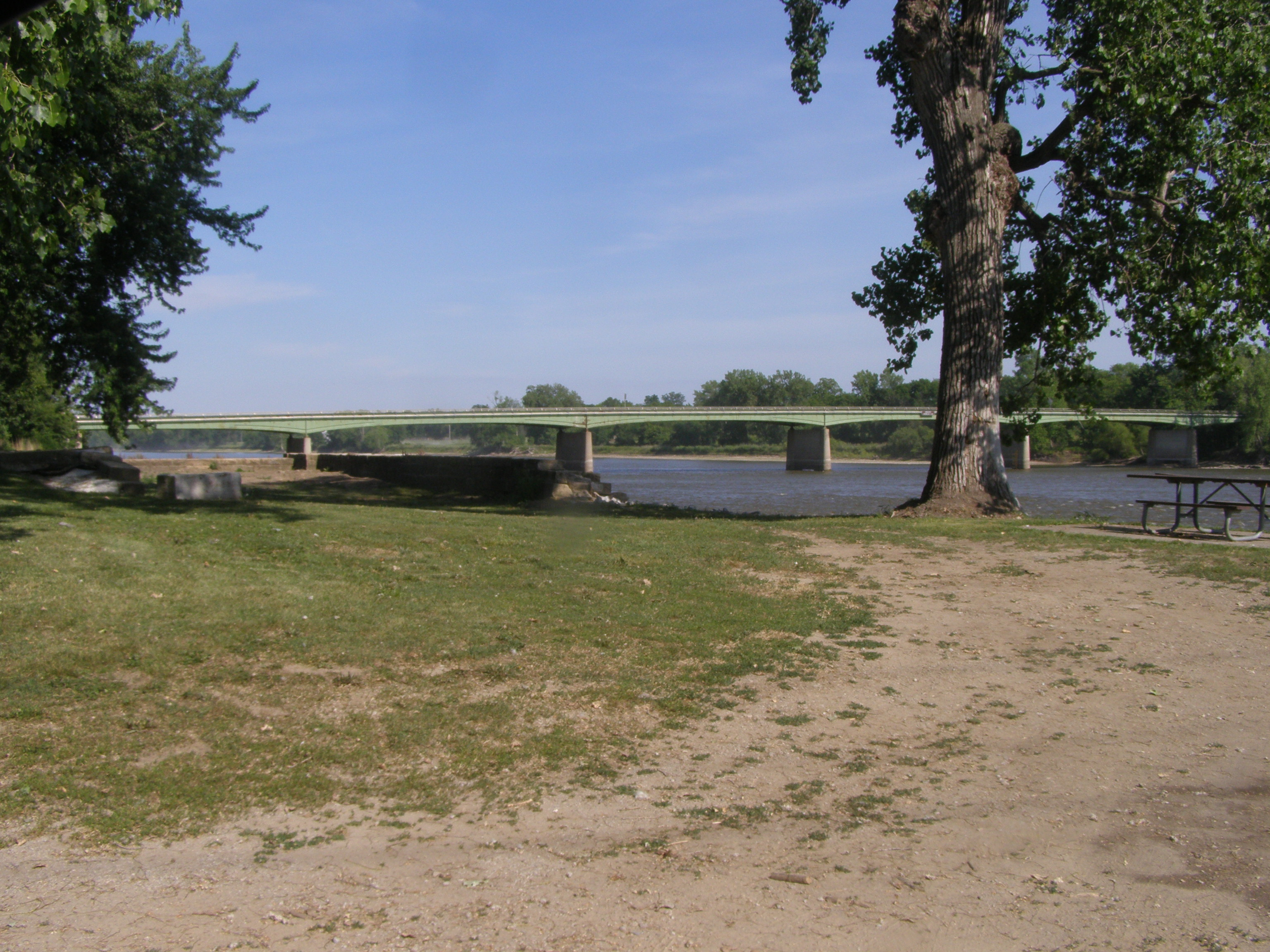
- Lock #5 can be seen at left.

- Location within Iowa Location within the United States
- Location: At the Des Moines River in Bonaparte, Iowa and Keosauqua, Iowa
- Coordinates: 40°41′51″N 91°48′00″W
- Area: less than one acre
- Built: 1849-1856
- Part of: Bonaparte Historic Riverfront District (ID89000313)
- NRHP reference No.: 77000561
- Added to NRHP: December 7, 1977

Des Moines River Locks No. 5 and No. 7, also known as the Bonaparte and Keosauqua Locks, comprise a discontinuous historic site located along the Des Moines River in Van Buren County, Iowa, United States. Lock No. 5 is located in a riverfront park in Bonaparte, and lock No. 7 is located near Keosauqua. The locks are the only structures that are known to exist for the Des Moines River Improvement Project. Steamboats were the primary means of transportation into the interior of Iowa, but the river was only navigable at certain times of the year and that made the shipping season too short and unpredictable. In 1846 the Iowa Legislature conceived a plan to build a lock and dam system along the Des Moines River to make it navigable from the Mississippi River to the city of Des Moines. These two locks and a third at Bentonsport, non extant, were the only locks of the 28 planned locks and dams that were completed. The project ended in 1858 because it was mismanaged, and the Keokuk and Des Moines River Railroad was being developed to cover the same territory at the same time. Two dams had also been completed, but they have since been removed. Even though the project was never completed, navigation was possible via the locks as far upriver as Keosauqua.

Lock No. 5 was begun in 1849 and completed in 1852. It was built by Meeks and Sons from Bonaparte. Beginning at the lower end, the remnants of this structure include 90 feet (27 m) of the outside wall and 120 feet (37 m) of the inside wall. They are both 3.5 feet (1.1 m) to 5.5 feet (1.7 m) thick. The recesses for the lower gates are still visible, as are some of the iron rings that were used to tie boats to the sides. At a later date, stone from the side walls was used to create a third wall across the lower end of the lock in an attempt to stabilize the structure. The lock itself is now silted in. Lock No. 7 was begun circa 1851 and was not completed until 1856 because of major structural problems. Keosauqua contractor Bonney and Whittelsey was responsible for its construction. Only one wall, 160 feet (49 m) long and 5 feet (1.5 m) wide, remains from what was the landside wall. It is surrounded by a farm field and a grove of trees about 30 feet (9.1 m) from the river bank. The walls for both locks are composed of large blocks of locally quarried limestone that are set on a foundation of limestone bedrock. The locks were listed on the National Register of Historic Places in 1977. In 1989 Lock No. 5 was included as a contributing property in the Bonaparte Historic Riverfront District.
