= Meek's Flour Mill =

- U.S. National Register of Historic Places
- U.S. Historic district – Contributing property
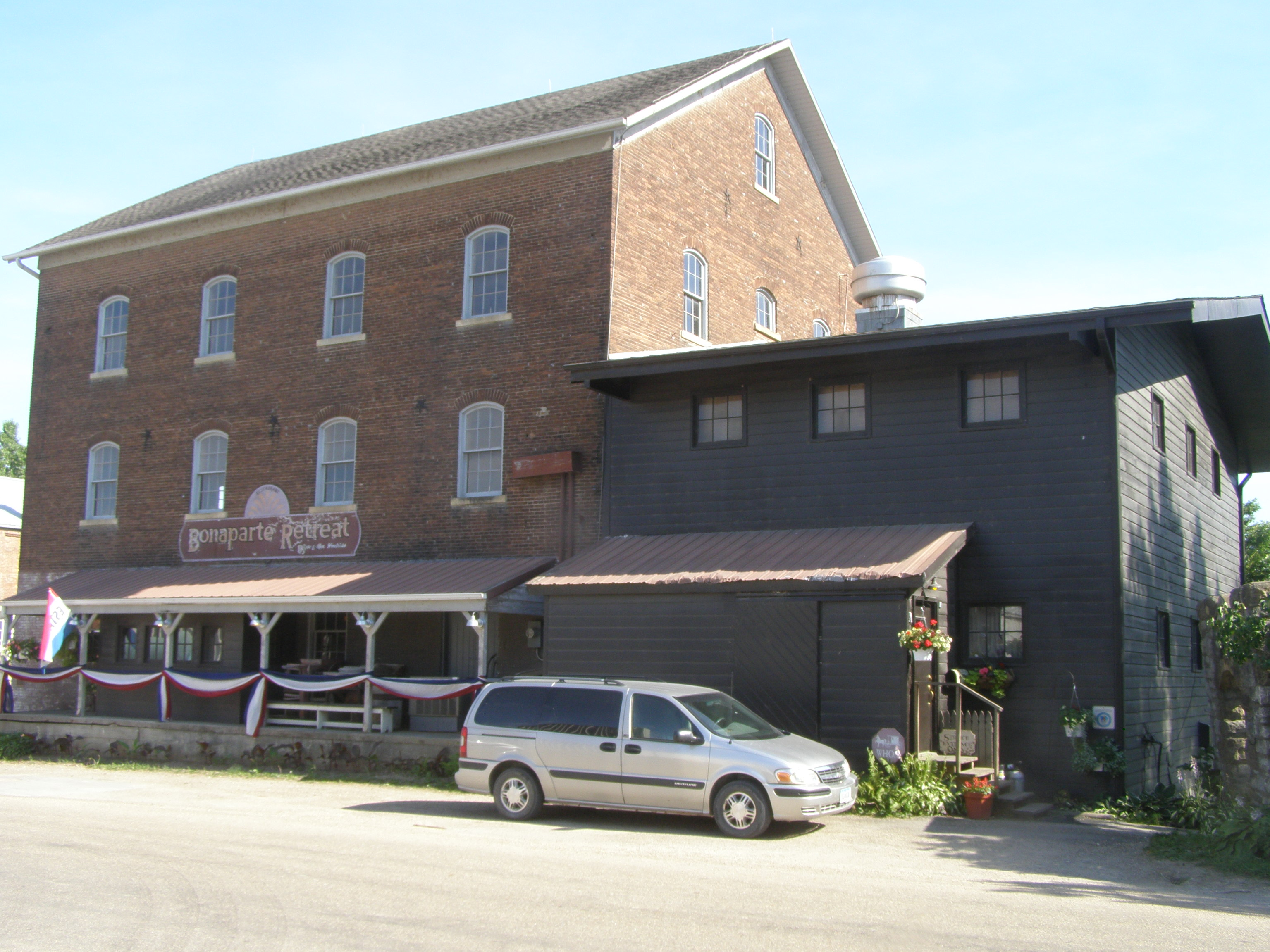

- Location within Iowa Location within the United States
- Location: 1st St. Bonaparte, Iowa
- Coordinates: 40°41′53″N 91°48′15″W
- Area: less than one acre
- Built: 1878
- Part of: Bonaparte Historic Riverfront District (ID89000313)
- NRHP reference No.: 83000406
- Added to NRHP: January 27, 1983

Meek's Flour Mill is a historic building located in Bonaparte, Iowa, United States. William Meek and Dr. R.N. Cresap laid out the town of Meek's Mill in 1837. Although the town was renamed Bonaparte in 1841, the Meek family had a central role in its development through the turn of the 20th century. The present building is a three-story, gable roofed, rectangular structure that was built on a raised basement of ashlar limestone blocks. It was constructed in 1878 by William's son Robert, who had succeeded his father in running the family businesses. He was assisted by his brothers Isaiah and Joseph. It replaced the original 1844 mill, which had been destroyed in a fire. While built on the same site, it is unknown if any part of the present structure was a part of the original mill. Two other structures belonging to the Meek's family are located nearby: a woolen mill (1853), and a saw mill (1860).

The mill was operated by Grant C. Scott and Stephen Blackburn by 1900, and Daniel Cresap was the last miller who operated the mill when a flood destroyed the dam in 1905. The building was left vacant for 21 years until a feed store was housed here from 1928 to 1963. The Farmers Cooperative Association occupied the building until 1977. It was then converted into a restaurant. The building was individually listed on the National Register of Historic Places in 1983. Six years later it was included as a contributing property in the Bonaparte Historic Riverfront District.
