= Paradise Farm =

- U.S. National Register of Historic Places
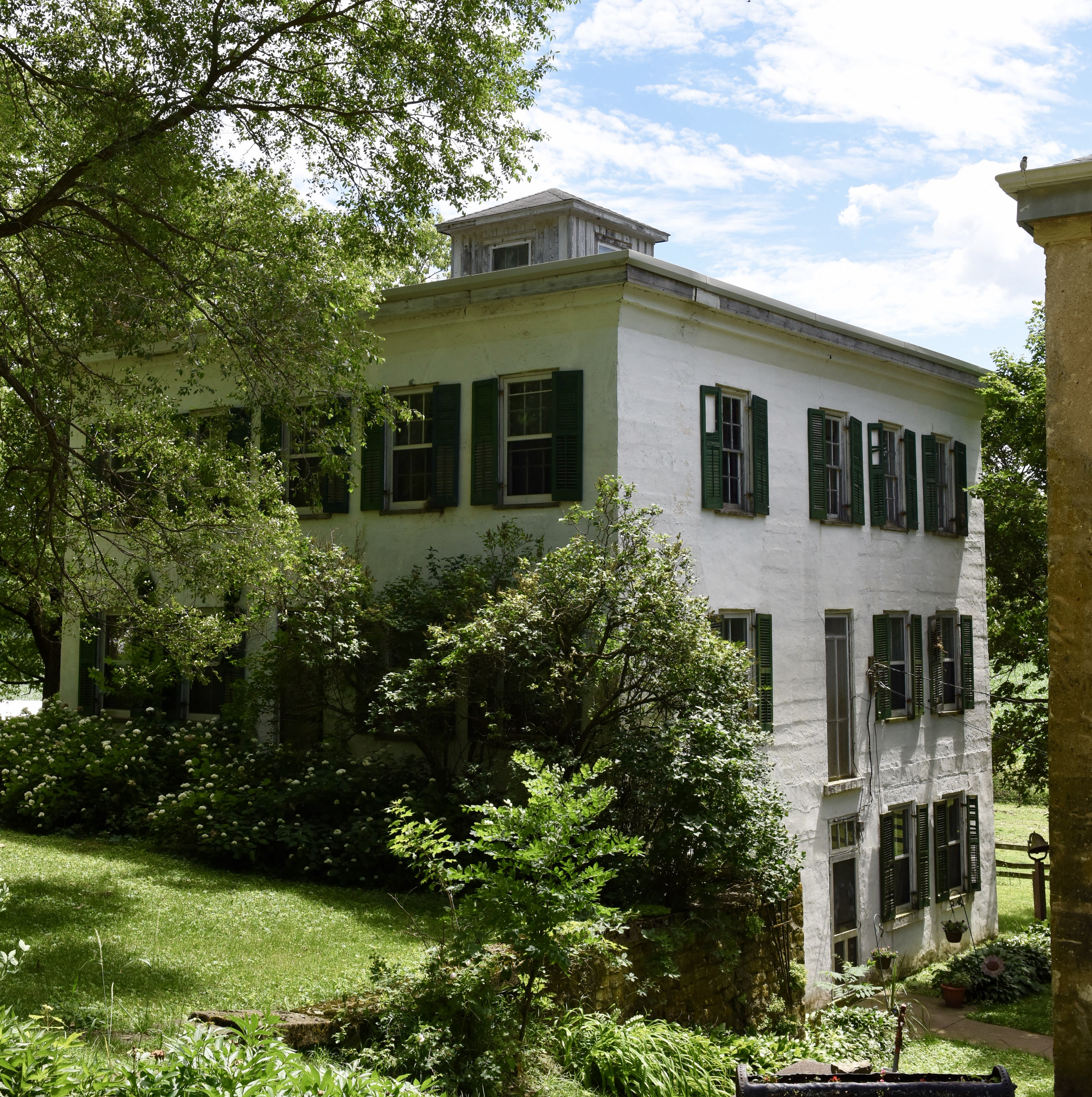

- Location within Iowa Location within the United States
- Location: West of Bellevue
- Coordinates: 42°16′21″N 90°29′18″W
- Area: less than one acre
- Built: 1846
- Architectural style: Vernacular
- NRHP reference No.: 77000520
- Added to NRHP: July 13, 1977

Paradise Farm are historic agricultural and domestic buildings located west of Bellevue, Iowa, United States. Massachusetts native Elbridge Gerry Potter settled near Big Mill Creek in 1842 from Illinois. He arrived here with 500 head of cattle, 40 teams of mules, and money. In addition to this farm he operated a flour mill and sawmill in Bellevue, and established steamboat lines on the Mississippi River at Bellevue, on the Yazoo River in Louisiana and the Red River in Texas.

This was Potter's home, and it included 1,400 acres (570 ha). The three buildings are coarsely-dressed limestone covered with stucco, and built in the mid-1840s. The main house, built in 1846, is three-story stone structure capped with a flat roof and a cupola. It housed the first lending library in Iowa. His book collection included subjects such as medicine, poetry, religion, and women's suffrage. He kept track of the books with a system of numbers and color codes for the books and the shelves. The three-story dormitory is a rectangular structure that housed the buttery, the farm's main kitchens and bunk quarters for workers. The carriage barn is a two-story, rectangular structure. One side of the ground level housed the carriages and wagons, and the second level housed the loft. It featured segmental arched windows with heavy stone sills. Paradise Farms has been home to generations of Potter's descendants. It was listed on the National Register of Historic Places in 1977.
