= Ida Sedgwick Proper =

- Born: August 27, 1873; Bonaparte, Iowa
- Died: June 7, 1957 (aged 83); Monhegan, Maine
- Other names: Ida S. Proper
- Occupations: artist, cartoonist, writer

Ida Sedgwick Proper (August 27, 1873 – June 7, 1957) was an American suffragist, writer and artist. She was an art editor for The Woman Voter. Proper has work in the permanent collections of the Smithsonian, and the Des Moines Art Center.

== Biography ==
Proper was born on August 27, 1873, in Bonaparte, Iowa, to Amanda Ellen (née Dodds) and Datus Dewitt Proper, as the fourth child of six. She went to Bethany College in Kansas. Through working in a library in Seattle, she raised enough money to move to New York where she became part of the Art Students League. By 1899, she had returned to Kansas and was giving art classes at Ottawa University. Proper was exhibiting oil paintings in Iowa by 1900. Proper earned a fellowship from the Art Students League to study in western Europe in 1903 and undertook studies in Germany. She returned to New York in the 1905 term and taught art at St. Mary's Seminary in Burlington, New Jersey, for a year. During that same time, she painted the portraits of two of the ex-governors of the state which were then hung in the New Jersey Statehouse. She taught art in 1906 at the Ladies Baptist College of Bristol, Virginia.

After the term ended, Proper went to Paris to further her studies and remained for four years. Her painting "Five O’Clock Tea" was featured at the 1910 Salon in Paris. She returned from Europe in 1911 and immediately participated in a New York City suffrage parade with 3,000 other marchers. Proper and sculptor Malvina Hoffman, along with another member of the group, Heterodoxy, opened their own gallery space in New York City in 1912. It was less profitable than the women hoped the venture would be. Proper also became the editor of The Woman Voter in 1912, and used her ties to artists in New York to solicit work for the journal. The Woman Voter was produced by the New York chapter of the American Woman Suffrage Association. In 1912 she became one of the founding members of Heterodoxy, a feminist group founded in Greenwich Village that met on alternate Saturdays to discuss a wide variety of issues.

In 1915, she exhibited works at the Panama–Pacific International Exposition. As suffrage activity increased, she marched in the New York Fourth of July parade along with other prominent suffragists. With a group of women artists who were also suffragists, Proper then organized an art show at the galleries of William Macbeth for that autumn. The artists donated half the proceeds from all sales of their works to the New York State suffrage drive. In the suffrage parade later that month, she marched dressed as a washerwoman, wearing a banner that read: "If politics are dirty, send for the cleaning woman." As the state vote over women's suffrage approached, Proper rode the New York subway with other suffragists bearing "lapboards" that supported woman's suffrage. Proper also organized a suffrage poster contest in New York to support the upcoming vote on the women's suffrage amendment. The prize for the best design was $50 and the words "Vote for the Woman Suffrage Amendment, November 2, 1915" were to be included in the design. Proper was chosen to lead the contest and exhibition because she was the chair of the art committee of the Woman's Suffrage Campaign.

Proper worked at the University of Puerto Rico from 1919 to 1922. Sometime in 1925 or 1926, she moved to Monhegan Island, where she bought a house, became town clerk and operated an art school. In 1930, she wrote and published a history about the island, Monhegan, the Cradle of New England.

== Work ==
Proper's paintings, exhibited "for Cause of Woman Suffrage" in 1915, were described by The New York Times as having a "gently exuberant quality." American Art News reviewed the same exhibition, calling her work "attractive and well drawn." Her paintings were described as being part of the modern French school.

Proper's suffragist cartoon "Anti Suffragist Parade" is an attack on anti-suffragists that appeared in Woman's Journal, September 21, 1912.

Proper's book Monhegan, the Cradle of New England (1930) contains information about documented and "probable possible explorers" who visited the island, including pre-Columbian explorers.

== Bibliography ==
- Monhegan, the Cradle of New England. Portland, Maine: The Southworth Press. 1930. OCLC 726766534.
- Our Elusive Willy: A Slice of Concealed Elizabethan History. Manchester, Maine: Dirigo Editions. 1953. OCLC 891954509.
