= Bonaparte Pottery Archeological District =

Historic district in Iowa, United States

- Bonaparte Pottery; Archeological District
- U.S. National Register of Historic Places
- U.S. Historic district
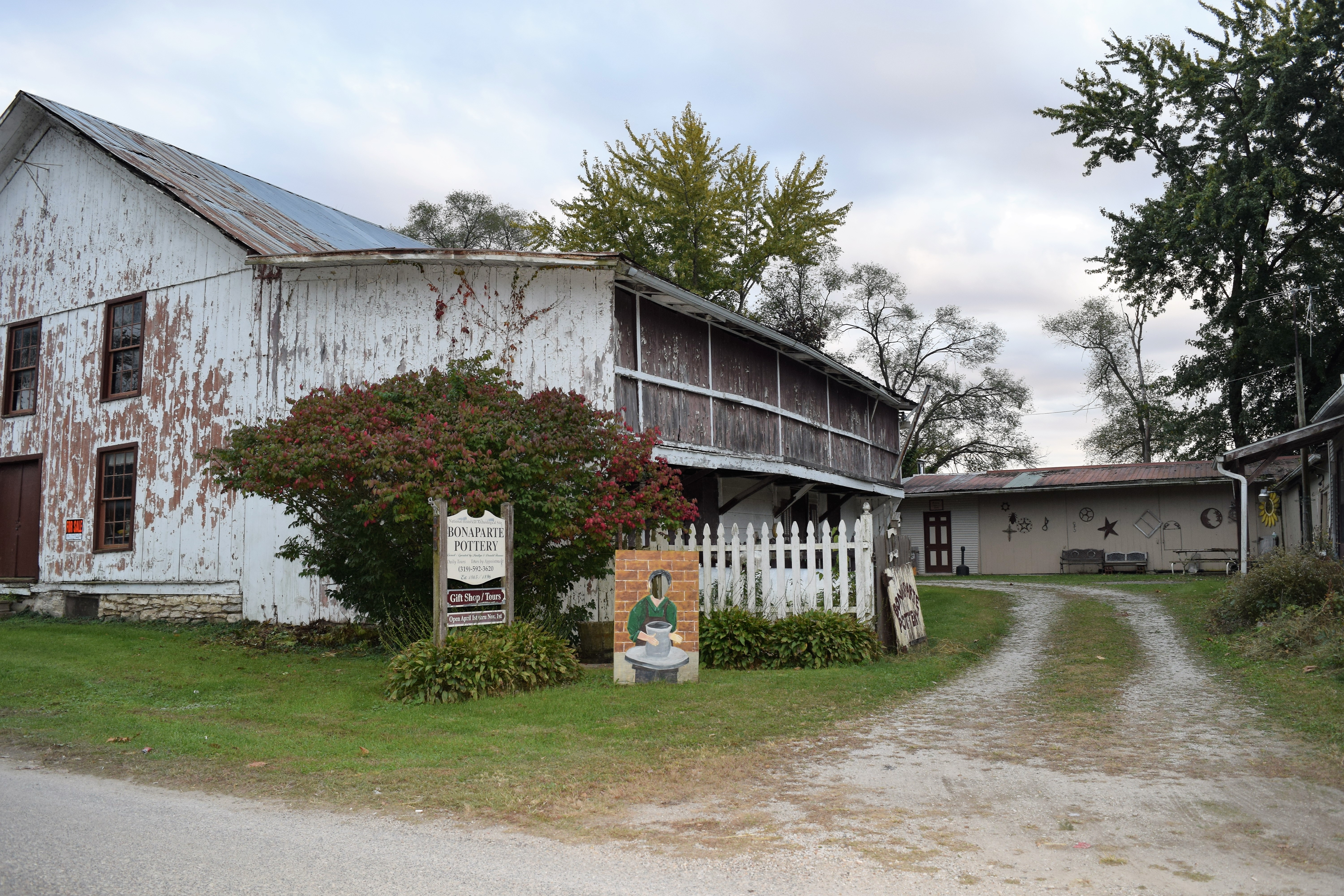

- Location within Iowa Location within the United States
- Location: 411-419 1st St. Bonaparte, Iowa
- Coordinates: 40°41′51″N 91°48′0″W
- Area: less than one acre
- NRHP reference No.: 99000832
- Added to NRHP: July 15, 1999

The Bonaparte Pottery Archeological District is a nationally recognized historic district located in Bonaparte, Iowa, United States. It was listed on the National Register of Historic Places in 1999. At the time of its nomination it contained four resources, which included one contributing building, one contributing site, and two non-contributing buildings. The contributing resources include the remains of two kilns from Bonaparte Pottery, which operated from 1866 to 1895. It also includes the factory building (1876) that replaced a building that was destroyed in a fire in November 1875. The non-contributing resources include two buildings that are associated with the lumberyard that took over the site after the pottery closed. They were built after the period of historical significance.

While modest in size compared with Red Wing Pottery in Minnesota and Western Stoneware in Illinois, Bonaparte Pottery was mid-sized operation associated with the pottery industry in Iowa. Pottery had a significant economic impact on the state from the mid to the late 19th century. The Des Moines River Valley had the greatest concentration of potteries in the state because of the abundant coal deposits located there. Fire clay, which is used to manufacture ceramics, was a by-product of coal mining. Sidney Parker and Thomas Hanback founded the business in 1866. Robert Wilson and Henry Jones joined the business in its later years. The pottery went out of business in 1895 for a variety of reasons. The financial panic of 1893 undoubtedly played a part, but Bonaparte experienced a severe decline in manufacturing that began in the 1890s. Other pottery operations had improved their mechanization, they had a better quality of clay, and they were located closer to population centers where they could sell their products.
