= Bonaparte Historic Riverfront District =

Historic district in Iowa, United States

- U.S. National Register of Historic Places
- U.S. Historic district
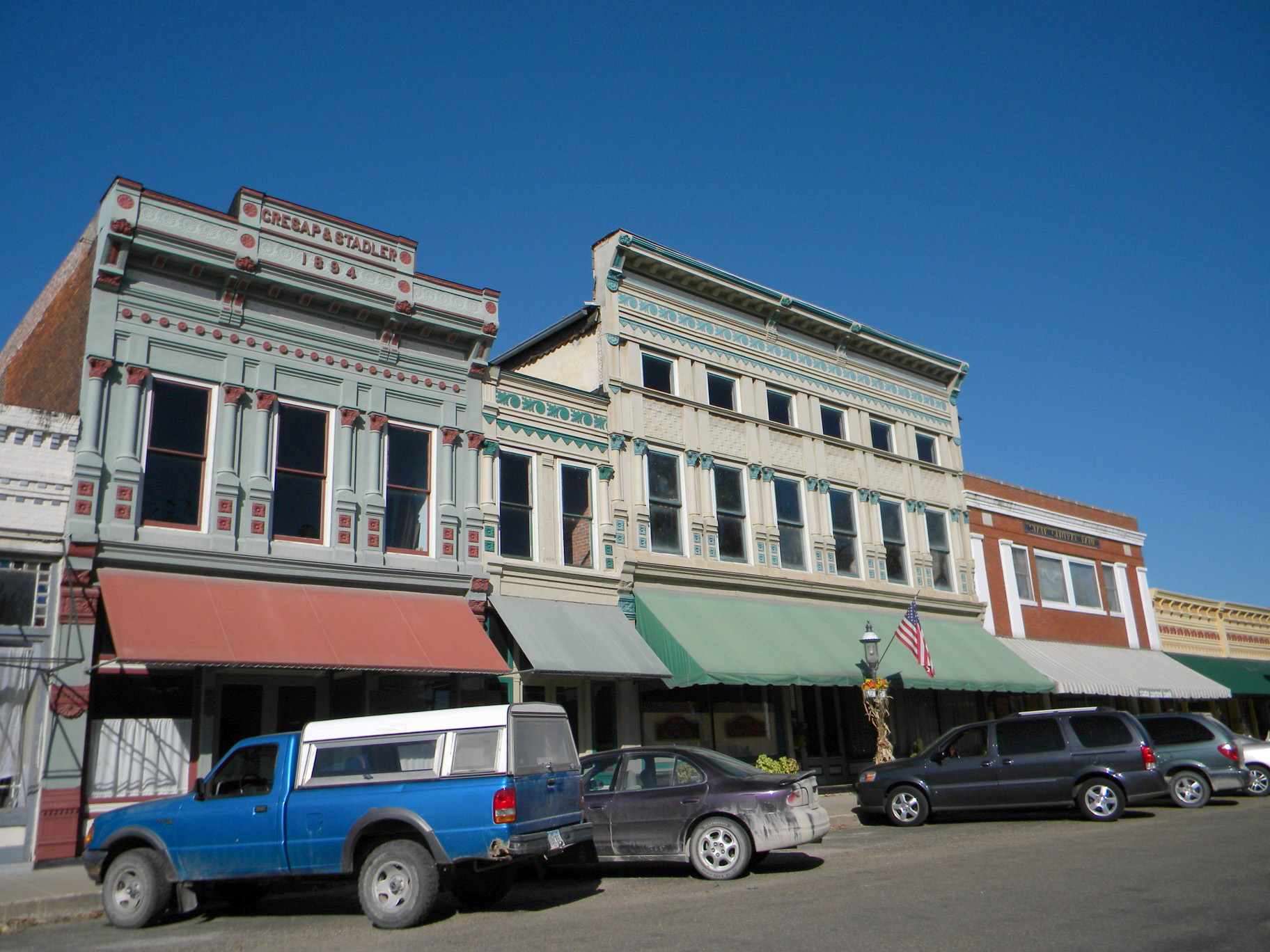

- Location within Iowa Location within the United States
- Location: Roughly bounded by 2nd St., Washington St., the Des Moines River, and Richard St., Bonaparte, Iowa
- Coordinates: 40°41′53″N 91°48′12″W
- Area: 7.1 acres (2.9 ha)
- NRHP reference No.: 89000313
- Added to NRHP: April 25, 1989

The Bonaparte Historic Riverfront District is a nationally recognized historic district located in Bonaparte, Iowa, United States. It was listed on the National Register of Historic Places in 1989. At the time of its nomination it contained 38 resources, which included 24 contributing buildings, one contributing structure, 11 non-contributing buildings, and two non-contributing structures. Three mill-related buildings near the Des Moines River are associated with the Meek's family who had a central role in the town's development from its founding through the turn of the 20th century. They include the woolen mill (1863), the flour mill (1878), which is individually listed on the National Register, and the pants factory (1892). Eighteen commercial buildings are of brick construction. Of those, eight are two-story structures, and ten are single-story structures. The remaining three buildings are wood frame commercial buildings. The single historic structure is the stone lock in the city park, which is also individually listed on the National Register.

In addition to the industrial buildings, the commercial buildings historically housed stores, a bank, an opera house, and a fraternal society. Bonaparte's commercial area was built on the riverfront to take advantage of the riverboats that were important for commerce when the town was founded in the 1830s. As the railroad came through the focus of river town commerce moved away from the river and focused on the rail station. Because of the Meek's facilities, Bonaparte continued to focus on the river until the mills closed in 1909. The period of significance is 1852 to 1909, and most of the non-contributing buildings and the structures were built after 1909. A couple of buildings have been altered to the point that they have lost their historic significance.
