= Theodore Niemann House and Spring House =

Historic house in Iowa, United States

- U.S. National Register of Historic Places
- Location within Iowa Location within the United States
- Location: Spruce Creek Rd. west of its junction with U.S. Route 52
- Nearest city: Bellevue, Iowa
- Coordinates: 42°17′35″N 90°29′24″W
- Area: less than one acre
- Built: 1845
- Architectural style: Vernacular
- MPS: Limestone Architecture of Jackson County MPS
- NRHP reference No.: 91001065
- Added to NRHP: August 30, 1991

The Theodore Niemann House and Spring House are historic buildings located northwest of Bellevue, Iowa, United States. They are two of over 217 limestone structures in Jackson County from the mid-19th century, of which 101 are houses. The residence is similar to most of the other houses in that it is a two-story structure that follows a rectangular plan, has dressed stone sills and lintels, and is capped with a gable roof. It differs from most of the others in that it is four bays wide rather than three or five, and it was stuccoed. It may have been influenced by the Luxembourgian houses in Tete Des Morts Township to the north. They have an even number of bays and are stuccoed. The small, single-story, spring house to the southeast appears to be from the same time period as the residence. It is square and capped with a hip roof. Built in 1845, the Niemann house is believed to be the oldest stone house in the county. The buildings were listed together on the National Register of Historic Places in 1991.

A native of Hanover, Theodore Niemann settled here in 1838. He built a log house on his property, and lived there until this house was built.
