= Jacob Wentz House =

Historic house in Iowa, United States

- U.S. National Register of Historic Places
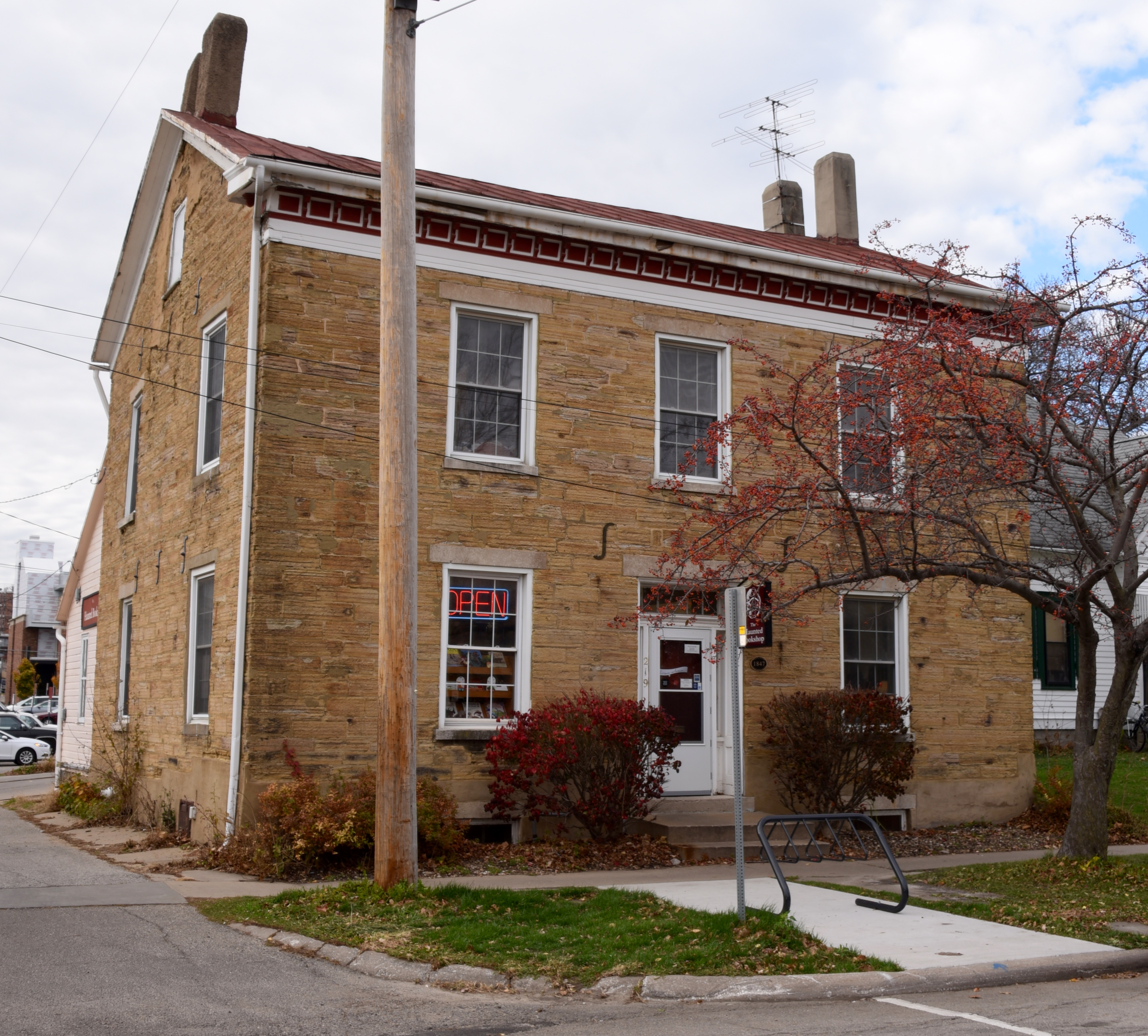

- Location within Iowa Location within the United States
- Location: 219 N. Gilbert St. Iowa City, Iowa
- Coordinates: 41°39′51.1″N 91°31′49.4″W
- Area: less than one acre
- Built: 1847
- Built by: Jacob Wentz
- Architectural style: Greek Revival
- NRHP reference No.: 74000794
- Added to NRHP: August 27, 1974

The Jacob Wentz House is a historic building located in Iowa City, Iowa, United States. Wentz was a German immigrant and a shoemaker by trade. This is one of the few native stone houses in Iowa City, and being two stories, rarer still. It is a fine example of the Greek Revival style, featuring symmetrical openings, dressed stone lintels, and a bracketed entablature. Originally a single family residence, it was converted into apartments and it now houses a retail business, The Haunted Bookshop. The house was listed on the National Register of Historic Places in 1974.
