= Taylor–Van Note House =

Historic house in Iowa, United States

- Taylor-Van Note
- U.S. National Register of Historic Places
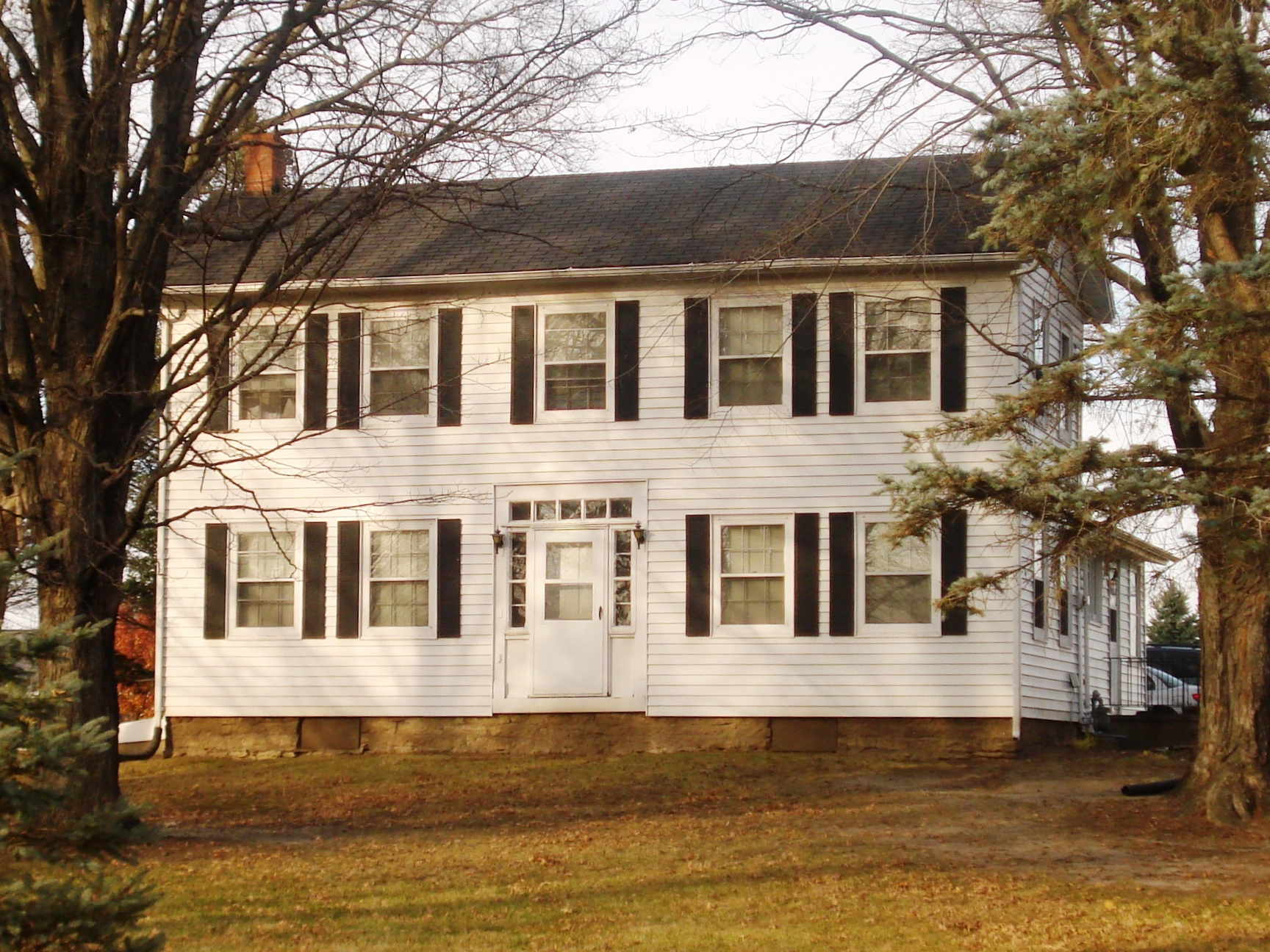

- Location within Iowa Location within the United States
- Location: 4600 Blairs Ferry Rd. Cedar Rapids, Iowa
- Coordinates: 42°02′31.3″N 91°43′43.7″W
- Area: less than one acre
- Built: 1846
- Architectural style: Greek Revival
- NRHP reference No.: 85003009
- Added to NRHP: October 10, 1985

The Taylor–Van Note House, also known as Blairs Ferry Wayside Inn/Vanesther Place, is a historic building located in Cedar Rapids, Iowa, United States. Charles Taylor built this two-story, wood frame, vernacular Greek Revival house in 1846. The family owned the house until 1888 when it was sold to Lazarus Van Note, whose family owned it as late as 1985. Oral legend has it that Taylor rented the front rooms to travelers as they passed through the region. It was located close to James Blair's ferry across the Cedar River, which is why the house has long been known as the Blairs Ferry Wayside Inn. The house was built of heavy timbers and exemplifies a traditional I-house. It features two rooms on both floors across its length, and one room deep. The main door is flanked by sidelights and a transom across the top. The house was listed on the National Register of Historic Places in 1985.
