= Bonaparte, Iowa =

- City
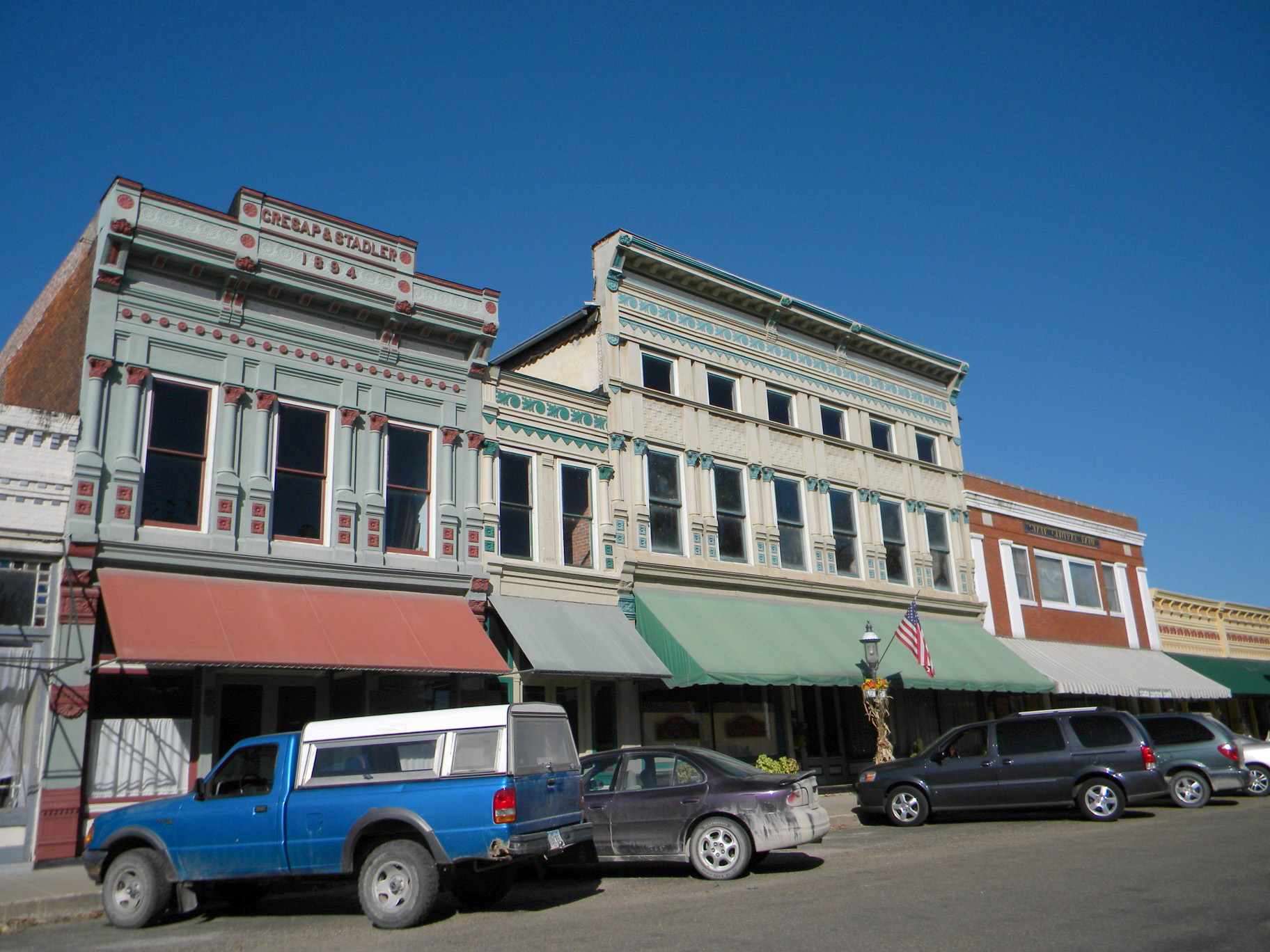
- Bonaparte Historic Riverfront District

- Location of Bonaparte, Iowa
- Coordinates: 40°42′04″N 91°48′03″W
- Country: United States
- State: Iowa
- County: Van Buren

Area
  - Total: 0.37 sq mi (0.97 km^{2})
  - Land: 0.37 sq mi (0.97 km^{2})
  - Water: 0 sq mi (0.00 km^{2})
- Elevation: 597 ft (182 m)

Population (2020)
  - Total: 359
  - Density: 959.7/sq mi (370.56/km^{2})
- Time zone: UTC-6 (Central (CST))
  - Summer (DST): UTC-5 (CDT)
- ZIP code: 52620
- Area code: 319
- FIPS code: 19-07345
- GNIS feature ID: 2394217

Bonaparte is a city in Van Buren County, Iowa, United States. The population was 359 at the 2020 census.

The town is located on the Des Moines River and contains a number of historical buildings, including a large pottery.

== History ==
The area was established in 1837 by William Meek, and named Meek's Mill. The lots were resurveyed in 1841, and the name was changed to Bonaparte. Another townsite called Napoleon was established across the river, though it was never developed. William Meek was an admirer of the Emperor, and was responsible for both names. The town was incorporated in 1899.

The town was flooded during the Flood of 1851.

Bonaparte is located along the historic Mormon Trail, and there are five sites in or near Bonaparte listed on the National Register of Historic Places:

- Aunty Green Hotel
- Bonaparte Historic Riverfront District
- Bonaparte Pottery Archeological District
- Meek's Flour Mill
- Des Moines River Locks No. 5 and No. 7

Charles E. Pickett, who served two terms as a U.S. Representative from Iowa's 3rd congressional district, was born near Bonaparte.

== Geography ==
According to the United States Census Bureau, the city has a total area of 0.37 square miles (0.96 km^{2}), all land.

== Demographics ==
Historical populations
Year	Pop.	±%
1880	689	—
1890	762	+10.6%
1900	898	+17.8%
1910	597	−33.5%
1920	656	+9.9%
1930	678	+3.4%
1940	653	−3.7%
1950	642	−1.7%
1960	574	−10.6%
1970	517	−9.9%
1980	489	−5.4%
1990	465	−4.9%
2000	458	−1.5%
2010	433	−5.5%
2020	359	−17.1%
Source:"U.S. Census website". United States Census Bureau. and Iowa Data Center; Source: U.S. Decennial Census

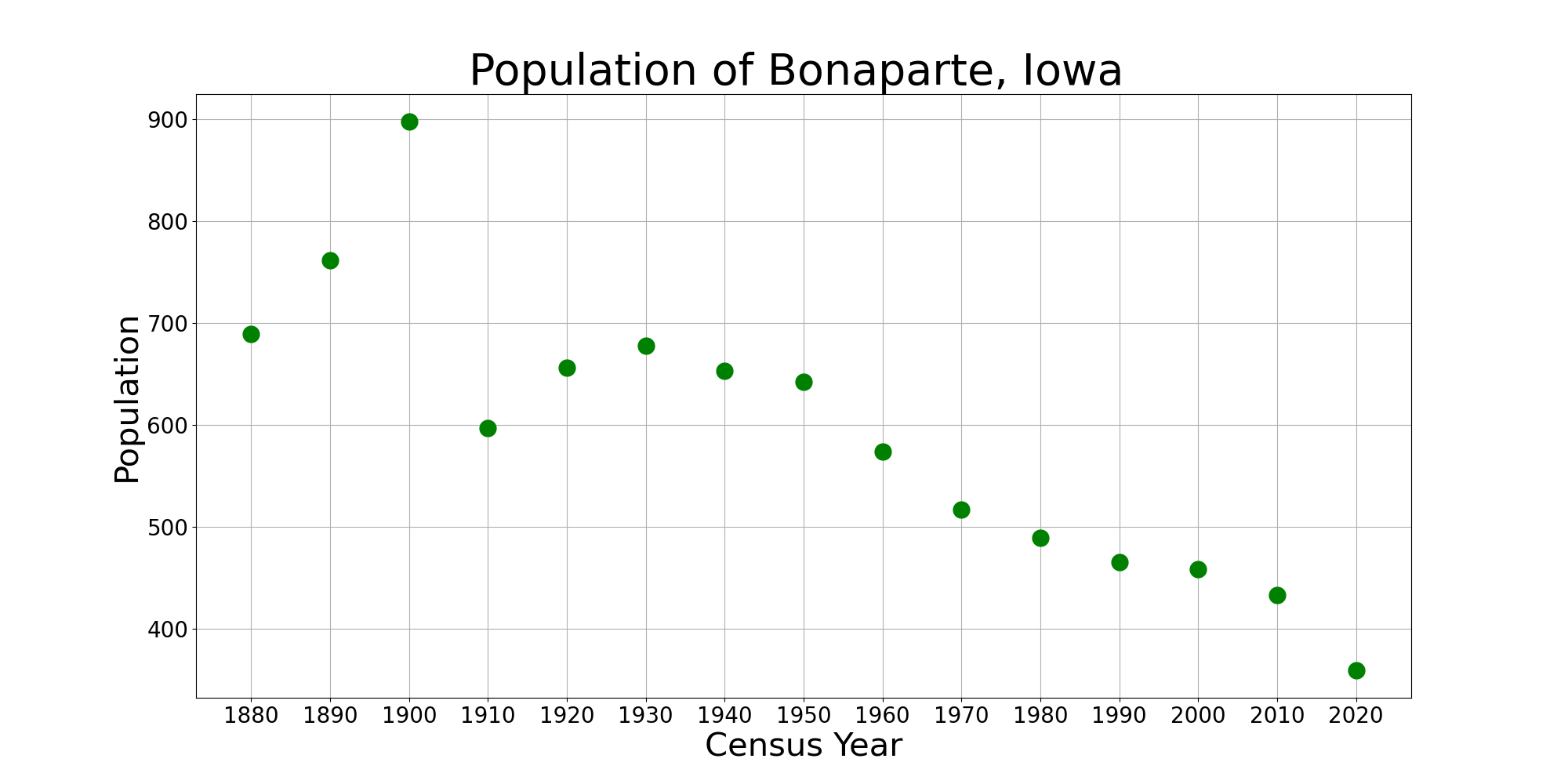
The population of Bonaparte, Iowa from US census data

=== 2020 census ===
As of the census of 2020, there were 359 people, 168 households, and 93 families residing in the city. The population density was 959.7 inhabitants per square mile (370.6/km^{2}). There were 195 housing units at an average density of 521.3 per square mile (201.3/km^{2}). The racial makeup of the city was 94.4% White, 0.3% Black or African American, 0.0% Native American, 0.3% Asian, 0.0% Pacific Islander, 0.6% from other races and 4.5% from two or more races. Hispanic or Latino persons of any race comprised 1.4% of the population.

Of the 168 households, 27.4% of which had children under the age of 18 living with them, 33.9% were married couples living together, 11.3% were cohabitating couples, 32.7% had a female householder with no spouse or partner present and 22.0% had a male householder with no spouse or partner present. 44.6% of all households were non-families. 38.7% of all households were made up of individuals, 22.0% had someone living alone who was 65 years old or older.

The median age in the city was 37.6 years. 29.5% of the residents were under the age of 20; 5.3% were between the ages of 20 and 24; 21.4% were from 25 and 44; 23.1% were from 45 and 64; and 20.6% were 65 years of age or older. The gender makeup of the city was 50.1% male and 49.9% female.

=== 2010 census ===
At the 2010 census, there were 433 people, 190 households and 117 families living in the city. The population density was 1,170.3 inhabitants per square mile (451.9/km^{2}). There were 212 housing units at an average density of 573.0 per square mile (221.2/km^{2}). The racial makeup of the city was 99.3% White, 0.2% Asian, 0.2% from other races, and 0.2% from two or more races. Hispanic or Latino of any race were 2.1% of the population.

There were 190 households, of which 29.5% had children under the age of 18 living with them, 44.2% were married couples living together, 15.3% had a female householder with no husband present, 2.1% had a male householder with no wife present, and 38.4% were non-families. 33.2% of all households were made up of individuals, and 14.3% had someone living alone who was 65 years of age or older. The average household size was 2.28 and the average family size was 2.91.

The median age was 37.3 years. 25.4% of residents were under the age of 18; 8.4% were between the ages of 18 and 24; 24.3% were from 25 to 44; 26.5% were from 45 to 64; and 15.2% were 65 years of age or older. The gender makeup was 48.0% male and 52.0% female.

=== 2000 census ===
At the 2000 census, of 2000, there were 458 people, 190 households and 121 families living in the city. The population density was 1,254.2 inhabitants per square mile (484.2/km^{2}). There were 212 housing units at an average density of 580.6 per square mile (224.2/km^{2}). The racial makeup was 100.00% White. Hispanic or Latino of any race were 1.31% of the population.

There were 190 households, of which 32.1% had children under the age of 18 living with them, 46.8% were married couples living together, 9.5% had a female householder with no husband present, and 36.3% were non-families. 31.1% of all households were made up of individuals, and 15.3% had someone living alone who was 65 years of age or older. The average household size was 2.41 and the average family size was 3.02.

27.3% of the population were under the age of 18, 10.5% from 18 to 24, 26.4% from 25 to 44, 20.7% from 45 to 64, and 15.1% who were 65 years of age or older. The median age was 34 years. For every 100 females there were 100.0 males. For every 100 females age 18 and over, there were 88.1 males.

The median household income was $28,438 and the median family income was $33,750. Males had a median income of $30,057 and females $19,479. The per capita income was $12,479. About 16.5% of families and 15.9% of the population were below the poverty line, including 12.0% of those under age 18 and 20.0% of those age 65 or over.

== Education ==
The community is served by the Van Buren County Community School District. It was previously in the Harmony Community School District, until it merged into Van Buren County CSD on July 1, 2019.

== Notable person ==
- Ida Sedgwick Proper, writer and suffragist
