= Moyce–Steffens House =

Historic house in Iowa, United States

- U.S. National Register of Historic Places
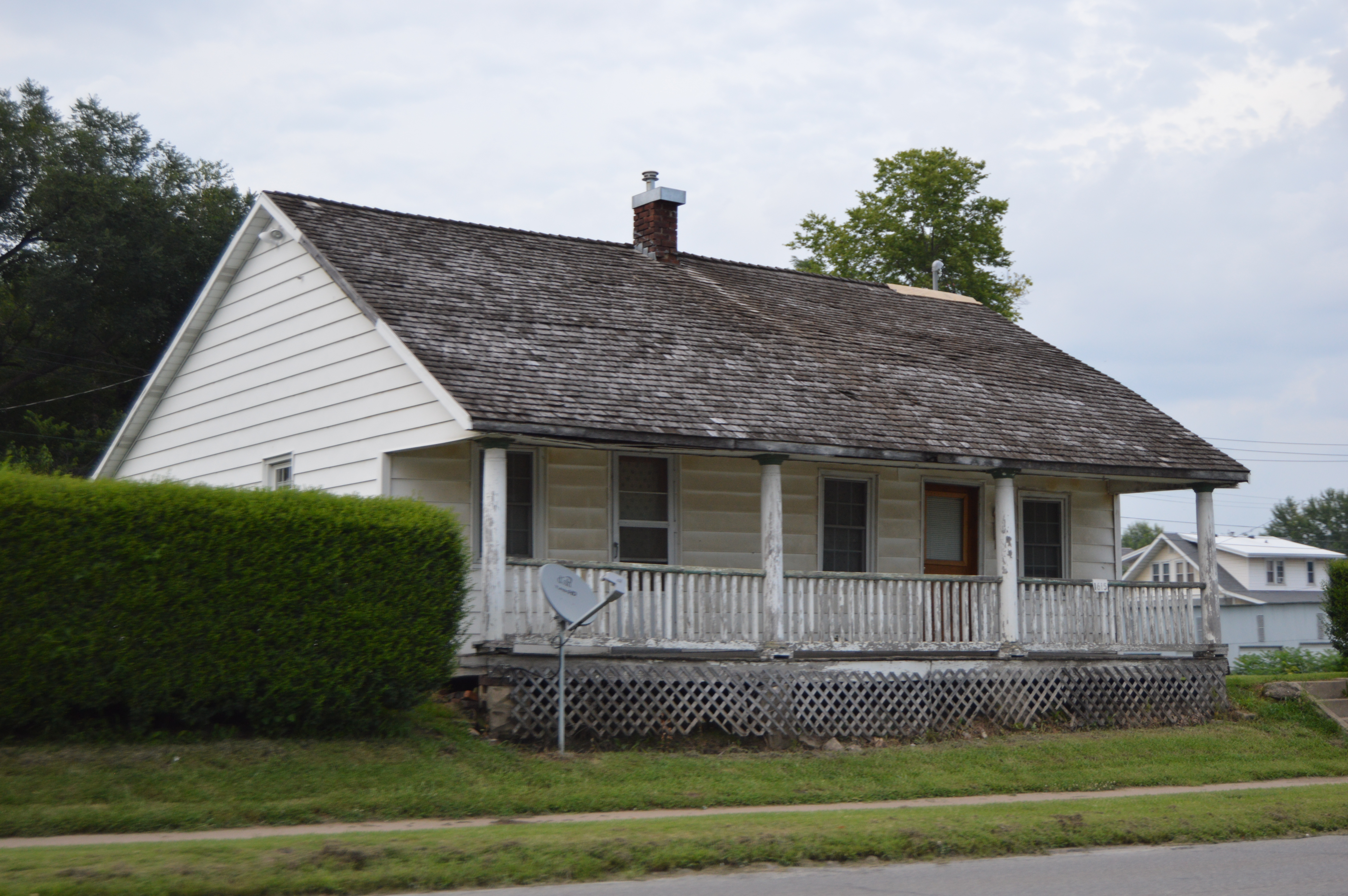

- Location within Iowa Location within the United States
- Location: 1615 Avenue H Fort Madison, Iowa
- Coordinates: 40°37′49″N 91°19′38″W
- Area: Less than one acre
- Built: 1844, 1857, 1892
- Built by: John Moyce; Hermann Steffens
- Architectural style: Vernacular
- NRHP reference No.: 97000394
- Added to NRHP: May 2, 1997

The Moyce–Steffens House, also known as the French Creek House, is a historic residence located in Fort Madison, Iowa, United States. It was listed on the National Register of Historic Places in 1997.

The house is named for the first two owners of the house, who also substantially built it. John Moyce was a stonemason, originally from Scotland. He built the original section of the house in 1844. It was a single room dwelling that was typical of the vernacular architecture built in frontier Iowa. It is noteworthy for its finely-hewn stone cellar walls. Moyce moved to Illinois in 1848 and the house was bought by Hermann Steffens. He was a carpenter's laborer who added a single room to the northeast corner of the house. It shows the advancement in building techniques by the use of milled studs instead of the pit-sawn and hewn studs, and the absence of brace framing that are found in the original section of the house.

Steffens died in 1882, and his widow Anna continued to live in the house until her death in 1904. During this time the western two rooms were added to the structure. It is possible this created a duplex as both the eastern and western sections of the house have their own front and rear entrances. This section, completed about 1892, shows further advancement in 19th-century building techniques. It utilizes balloon framing, and the brick nogging utilized in the earlier two sections is absent. The Tuscan columns found on the front porch are typical of the Colonial Revival style and replaced the original square posts with chamfered edges around 1910. Three of them were located in the cellar supporting a sagging foundation sill plate.
