= Aunty Green Hotel =

- U.S. National Register of Historic Places
- Location within Iowa Location within the United States
- Location: 602 Washington St. Bonaparte, Iowa
- Coordinates: 40°41′55″N 91°48′06″W
- Area: less than one acre
- Built: 1844
- NRHP reference No.: 78001265
- Added to NRHP: January 20, 1978

Aunty Green Hotel is a historic building located in Bonaparte, Iowa, United States. The hotel was built by John Green in 1844. His wife Mary continued to operate the hotel for many years after his death, and that is what gave the business its name. It was the second hotel established in town, and it is believed to be the first brick building constructed in Bonaparte. Other businesses that have been housed in this building include a photography studio, doctor's offices, the first local telephone exchange, a creamery and a gas station. The Van Buren County Historical Association rescued the structure from demolition. It is currently owned by the Bonaparte Historical Society and houses the Auntie Green Museum and the public library.

The hotel portion of the building is two-story brick structure with a gable roof with a two-story wooden porch along the street. There is a gate in the railing where luggage from stage coaches was unloaded and brought directly to the guest rooms on the second floor. There is a one-story structure with a gable roof attached to the rear of the building. It is believed to have been the residence for the hotel proprietor, and possibly built at slightly a later date. It was listed on the National Register of Historic Places in 1978.
