= Rose Hill (Iowa City, Iowa) =

Historic house in Iowa, United States

- U.S. National Register of Historic Places
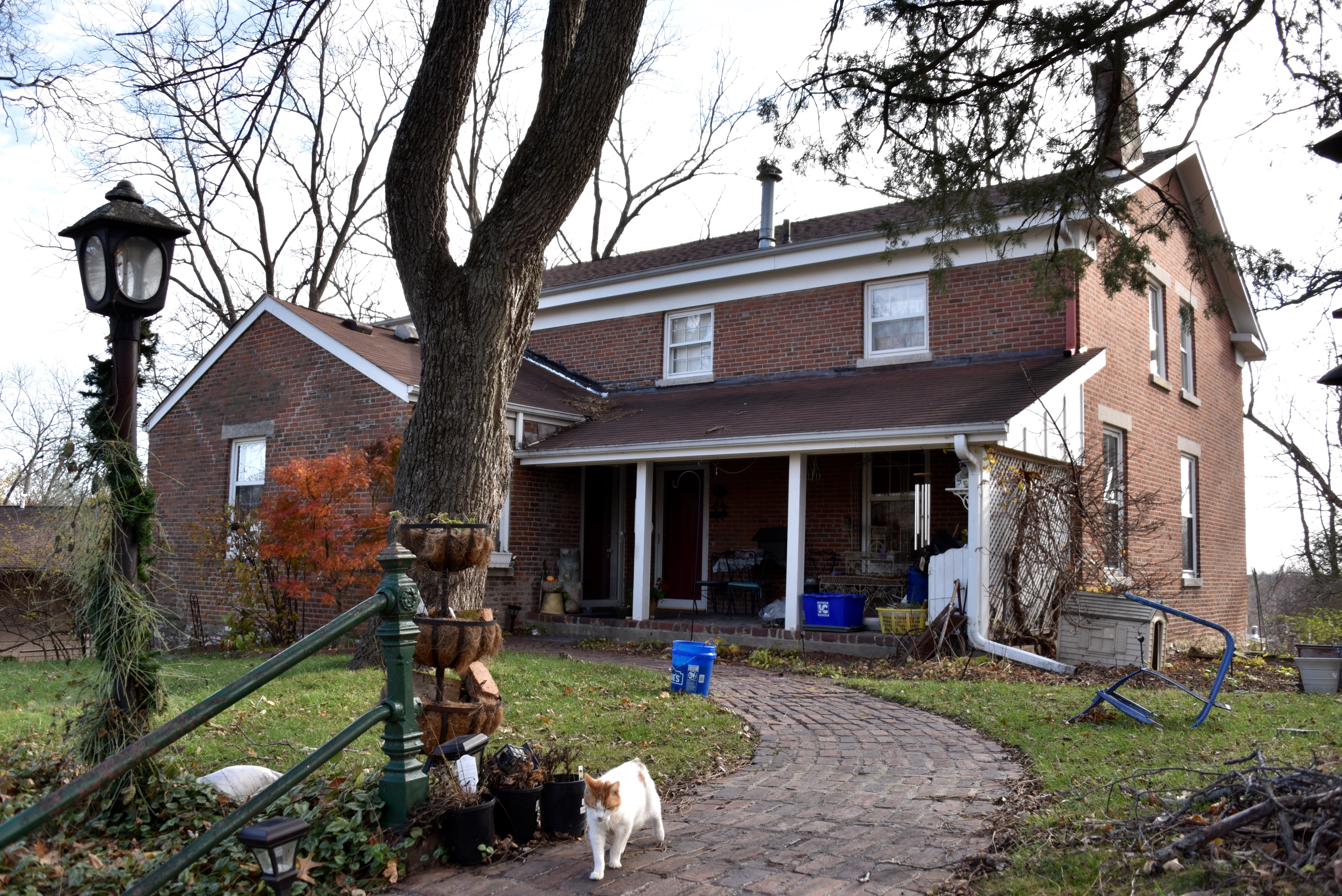

- Location within Iowa Location within the United States
- Location: 1415 E. Davenport St., Iowa City, Iowa
- Coordinates: 41°39′55.8″N 91°30′53.6″W
- Area: less than one acre
- Built: 1849
- Architectural style: Greek Revival
- NRHP reference No.: 92000425
- Added to NRHP: April 28, 1992

Rose Hill, also known as the Irish-Goetz House, is a historic building located in Iowa City, Iowa, United States. It was built as a farmhouse in 1849 by Frederick Irish, an early settler in this community. His descendants would own this house until 1964. After he arrived in 1839, Irish built a cabin wherein the commissioners chose the site for the new territorial capital and then the design for the building. Irish remained a prominent citizen in Iowa City who was appointed, along with former Governor Robert Lucas, to a group working to bring the railroad to Iowa City. When he built this house he chose the Greek Revival style, which might reflect his relationship with John F. Rague who designed the Capitol building here. It also reflects the housing styles of his native New York, and is very similar to the "farmhouse elevation" found in Minard Lafever's work, Young Builder's General Instructor. The house was listed together on the National Register of Historic Places in 1992.
