= Windrem House =

Historic house in Iowa, United States

- U.S. National Register of Historic Places
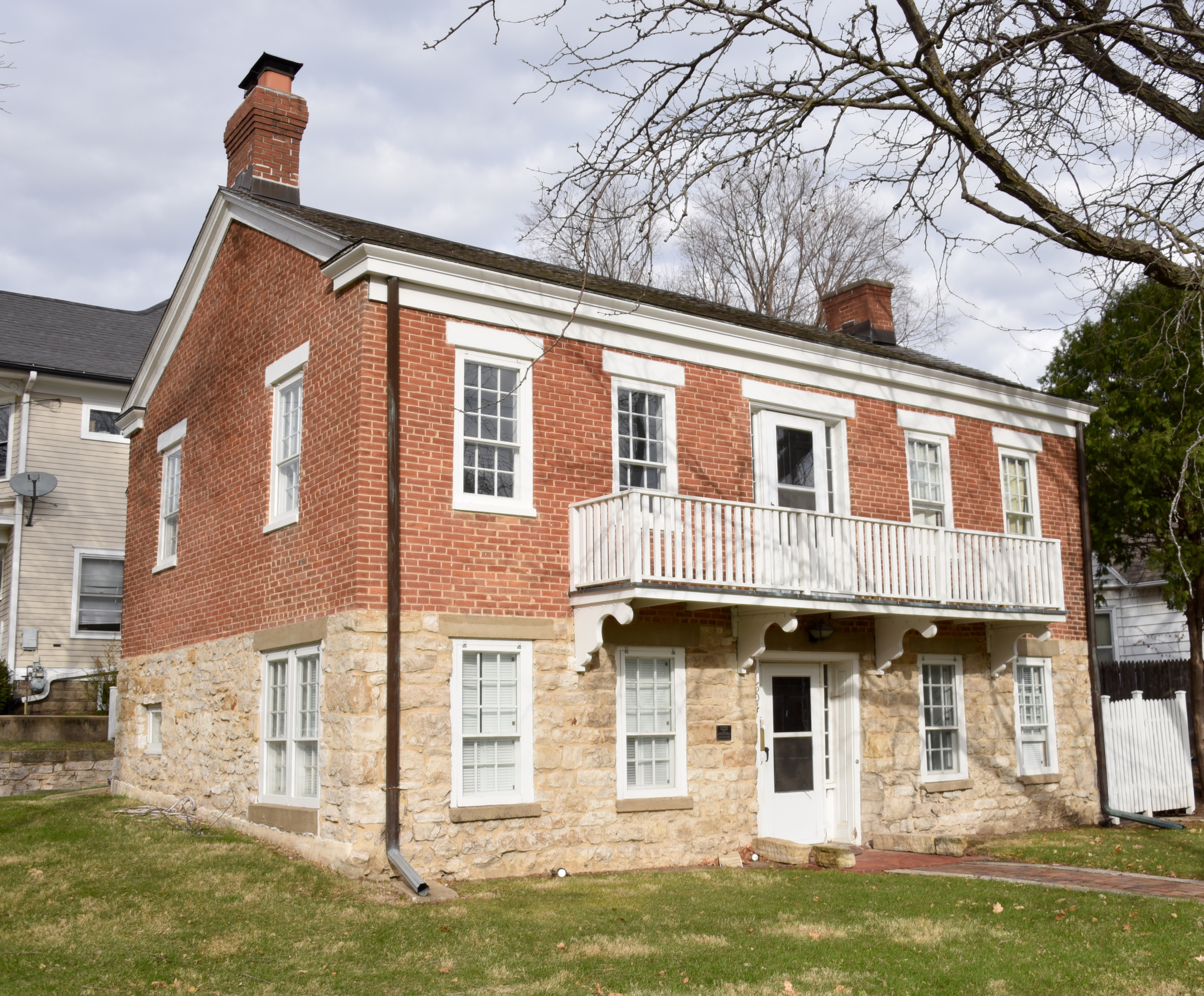

- Location within Iowa Location within the United States
- Location: 800 N. Van Buren St. Iowa City, Iowa
- Coordinates: 41°39′41.4″N 91°31′37.1″W
- Area: less than one acre
- Built: c 1850
- Built by: William Windrem
- NRHP reference No.: 77000531
- Added to NRHP: September 13, 1977

The Windrem House is a historic building located in Iowa City, Iowa, United States. William Windrem was an Irish immigrant who learned the carpenter's trade in Ogdensburg, New York. He came to Iowa City in 1842 where he helped construct what is now known as the Old Capitol. Windrem bought this property in 1845, and built this house sometime thereafter. Built into the side of a slope, the rear of the house is 7-foot (2.1 m) to 8-foot (2.4 m) below ground. The lower floor is constructed of limestone and the second floor is brick. Both floors have a formal entrance flanked by sidelights. The second floor entrance opens onto a wooden veranda. The cornice is located just above the second floor windows. The side gable roof has a chimney at each end. A 1941 renovation substantially changed the arraignment of the interior rooms, and some minor changes to the exterior. The house was listed on the National Register of Historic Places in 1977.
