= Upper Paradise =

Historic house in Iowa, United States

- U.S. National Register of Historic Places
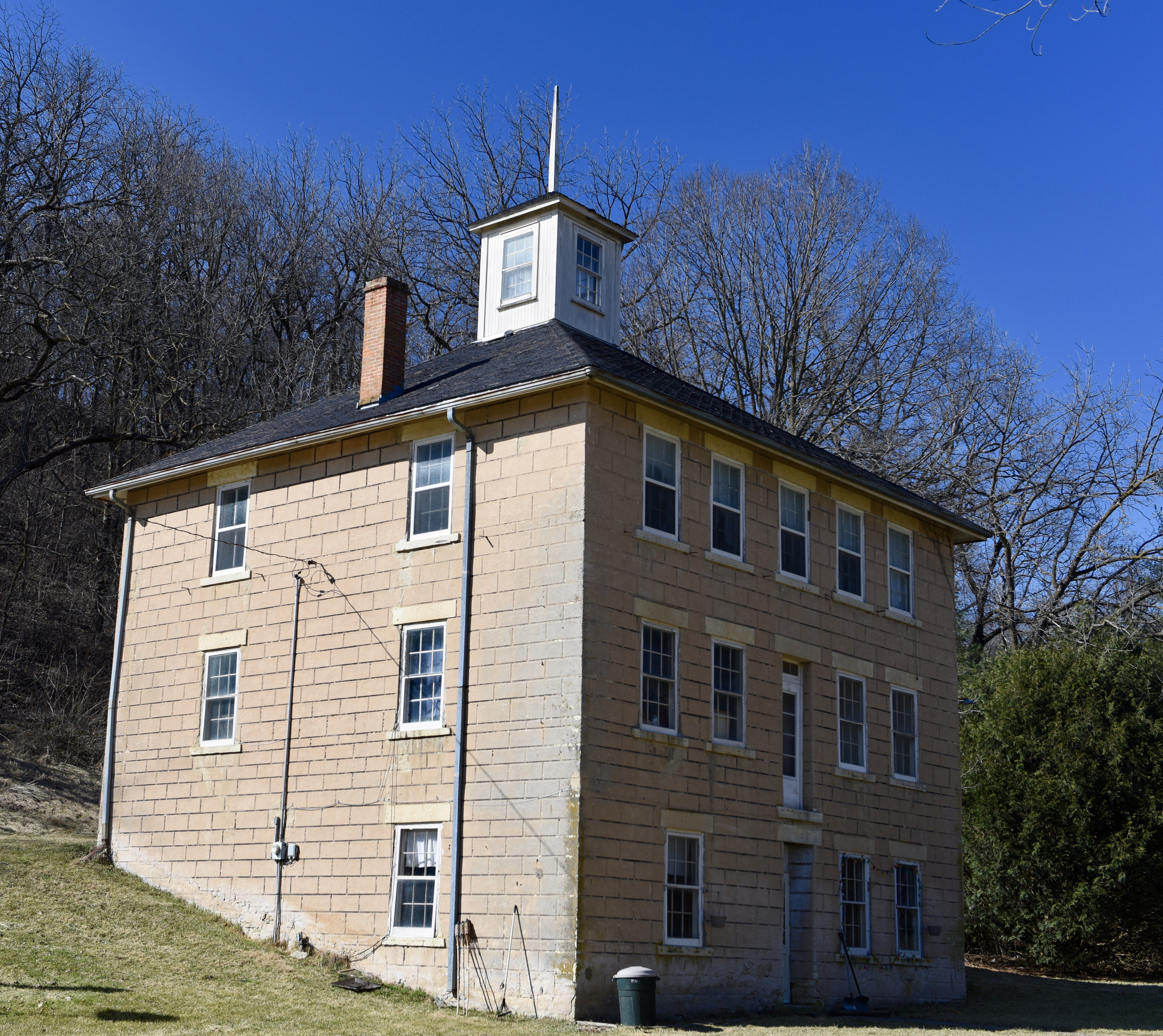

- Location within Iowa Location within the United States
- Location: Paradise Valley Rd. west of Bellevue
- Coordinates: 42°16′24″N 90°30′20″W
- Area: less than one acre
- Built: 1849
- Architectural style: Vernacular
- MPS: Limestone Architecture of Jackson County MPS
- NRHP reference No.: 91001074
- Added to NRHP: August 30, 1991

Upper Paradise is a historic building located west of Bellevue, Iowa, United States. It is one of over 217 limestone structures in Jackson County from the mid-19th century, of which 101 are houses. It is one of 12 houses with a hip roof, and it is one of two that are capped with a belvedere. It was built in 1849 into the side of a hill, so the south elevation has three floors and the north elevation has two. It features limestone sills and lintels. Another unusual feature of this house is that it was covered in a thick layer of stucco. The other stone houses in the county that were stuccoed were only given a thin layer. The house was listed on the National Register of Historic Places in 1991.
