= Abiathar and Nancy White House =

Historic house in Iowa, United States

- U.S. National Register of Historic Places
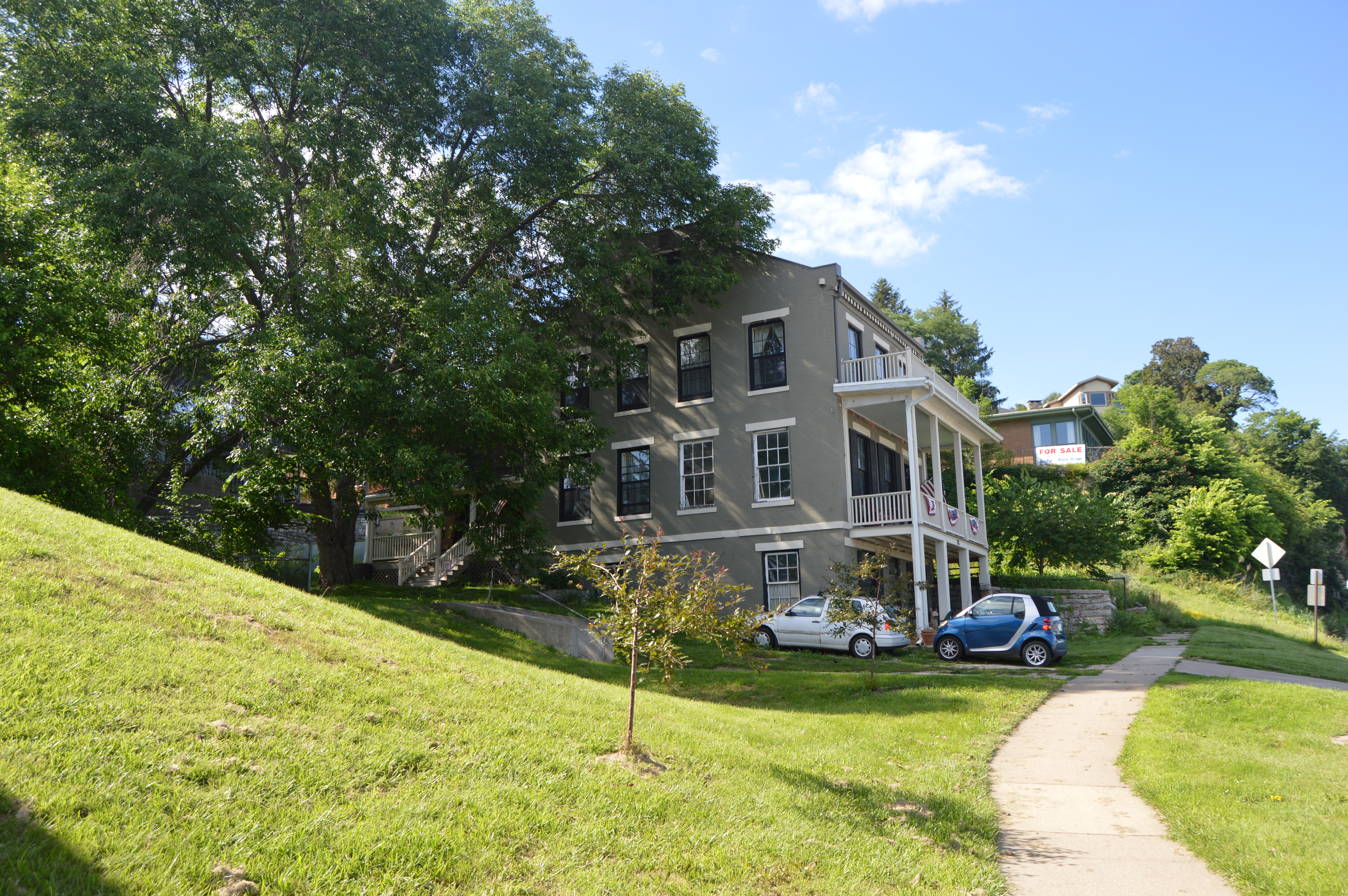

- Location within Iowa Location within the United States
- Location: 713 N. Main St. Burlington, Iowa
- Coordinates: 40°48′50″N 91°06′01.5″W
- Area: less than one acre
- Built: c. 1840
- Architectural style: Federal
- NRHP reference No.: 13001076
- Added to NRHP: January 15, 2014

The Abiathar and Nancy White House is a historic building located in Burlington, Iowa, United States. Built c. 1840, this is the largest Federal-style building in the city. Abiathar and Nancy White moved their family to Burlington from Dighton, Massachusetts in 1838. They acquired this property the same year. Abiathar was a carpenter who may have built this house. One of Abiathar and Nancy's sons, Charles Abiathar White, became a well-known geologist and paleontologist. This was his childhood home.

The house was built as a single-family dwelling, but since 1850 it has been listed as a multiple-family dwelling. It was built into a limestone hillside. The brick structure rises three stories and includes an attic. It features side gables with parapets between the chimneys, dentiled brick cornice, limestone lintels and sills, and a two-story frame front porch. It was listed on the National Register of Historic Places in 2014.
