= Western Hotel (Holy Cross, Iowa) =

Historic house in Iowa, United States

- U.S. National Register of Historic Places
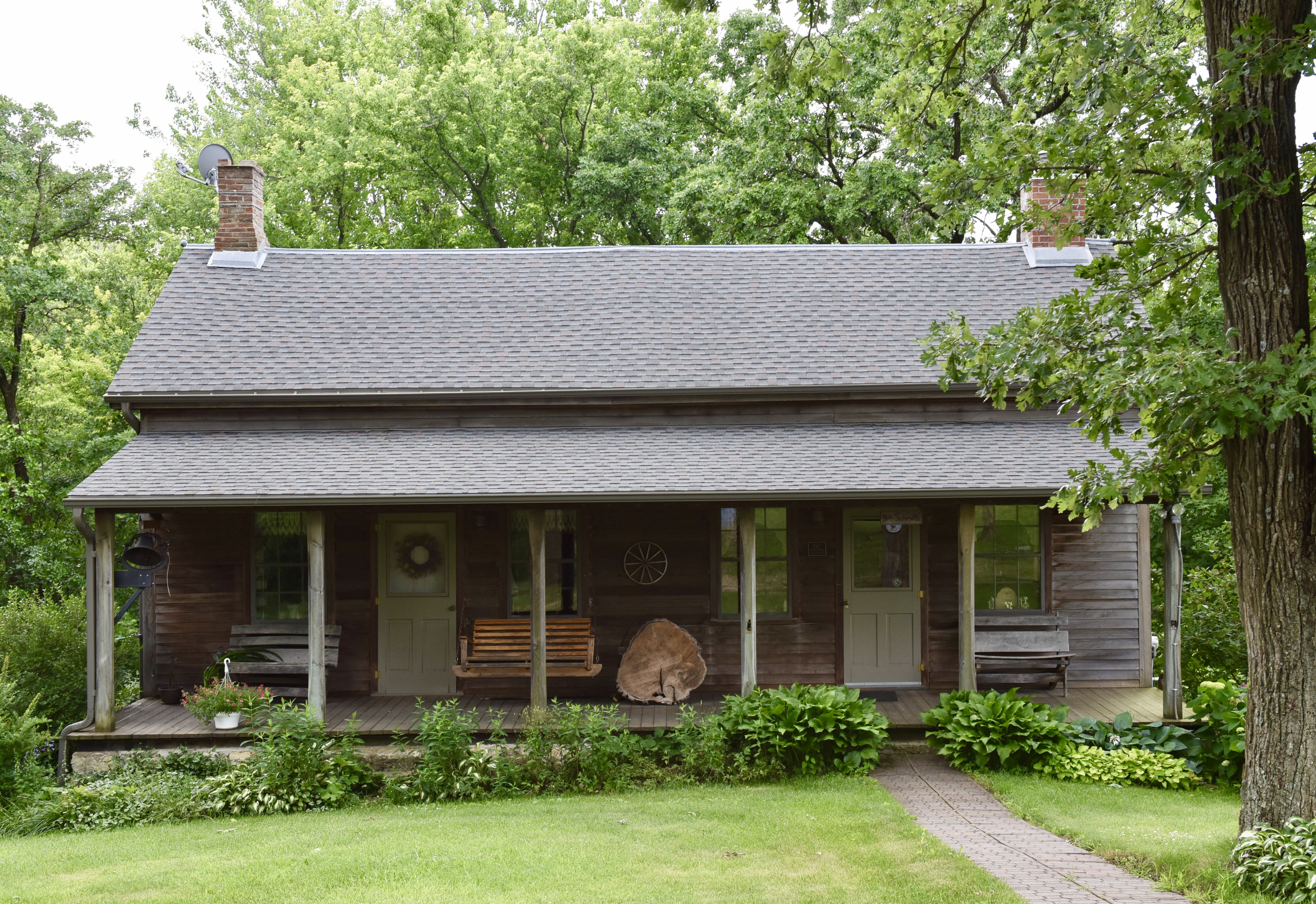

- Location within Iowa Location within the United States
- Location: Southeast of Holy Cross on U.S. Route 52
- Coordinates: 42°35′36″N 90°58′53″W
- Area: 2 acres (0.81 ha)
- Built: 1849-1850
- Built by: John Floyd
- NRHP reference No.: 76000769
- Added to NRHP: November 7, 1976

The Western Hotel, also known as the Pin Oak Tavern, is a historic building located southeast of Holy Cross, Iowa, United States. John H. Floyd settled in Dubuque County in the early 1830s. He was appointed postmaster in the 1840s, and he had this building built for his home and as the Pin Oak Post Office. It is a rare example of a frame saltbox-style building in Iowa. Its foundation is of undressed native limestone. The house was located along a popular route to and from the city of Dubuque and it became known as hospitable place for good food, drink, and rest. It was called the Western Hotel for a time because they had acquired a sign from a same-named place in Dubuque. The building was listed on the National Register of Historic Places in 1976.
