= Potter's Mill =

- E. G. Potter's Jasper Flour Mill
- U.S. National Register of Historic Places
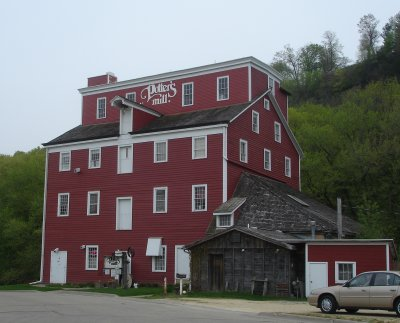
- Potter's Mill, Bellevue, Iowa

- Location within Iowa Location within the United States
- Location: South and 2nd St. Bellevue, Iowa
- Coordinates: 42°15′3″N 90°25′36″W
- Built: 1843
- Architect: E.G. Potter, John Gammel
- NRHP reference No.: 84001257
- Added to NRHP: April 19, 1984

Potter's Mill is a tavern and bed and breakfast establishment located in Bellevue, Iowa. The structure was formerly a gristmill, being the oldest in the state of Iowa, and as such it has earned national recognition. Potter's Mill is on the National Register of Historic Places, as well as being named a point of interest in the Silos & Smokestacks National Heritage Area.

== History ==
Elbridge Gerry Potter first came to the Bellevue area in 1843 from New Lebanon, Illinois. Potter had been searching for a place to locate a flour mill, and came to decide on Bellevue for the location. Potter and local millwright John Gammel built a mill on what became known as Big Mill Creek. They used limestone from the nearby bluffs to build the mill and a nearby dam. Timber came from nearby areas. At first the mill was powered by an overshot waterwheel located along the southern side of the mill. The total cost to build the structure at the time was about $40,000.

By 1845 the mill was in operation. Potter had customers in many major central and eastern U.S. cities, and purchased the wheat from local farmers as well as farmers in Minnesota and Wisconsin. Potter later extended the dam in order to install six turbines that in turn operated six milling stones. Potter operated the mill until 1871, when he sold the mill to Kilborn and Company.

Kilborn and Company operated the mill for the next ten years. In 1881, they sold the mill to Arnold Reiling. The mill was damaged by a flash flood on May 24, 1896. In the aftermath the spillway was replaced by a 35 horsepower (26 kW) Atlas steam engine. Reiling and his family owned and operated the mill for the next 38 years before they decided to sell the property. Over the next few years, several different parties owned and operated the mill until it was purchased by the Dyas family in 1931. The Dyas family continued to operate the mill until 1969. Finally in 1969 the mill stopped producing flour.

The property was put up for sale at an auction in 1980. Daryll and Carolyn Eggers purchased the structure at this auction, and set about restoring the mill. In 1985 they opened Potter's Mill as a B&B/Event Center. After years of running the business, the building was finally put up for sale.

In August 2014 the building reopened as "Flatted Fifth Blues and BBQ at Potter's Mill" and "The Inn at Potter's Mill."

Flatted Fifth Blues and BBQ closed on December 31, 2023, and was replaced by The Tavern.
