= Old Settlers' Association Park and Rhodham Bonnifield House =

Historic district in Iowa, United States

- U.S. National Register of Historic Places
- U.S. Historic district
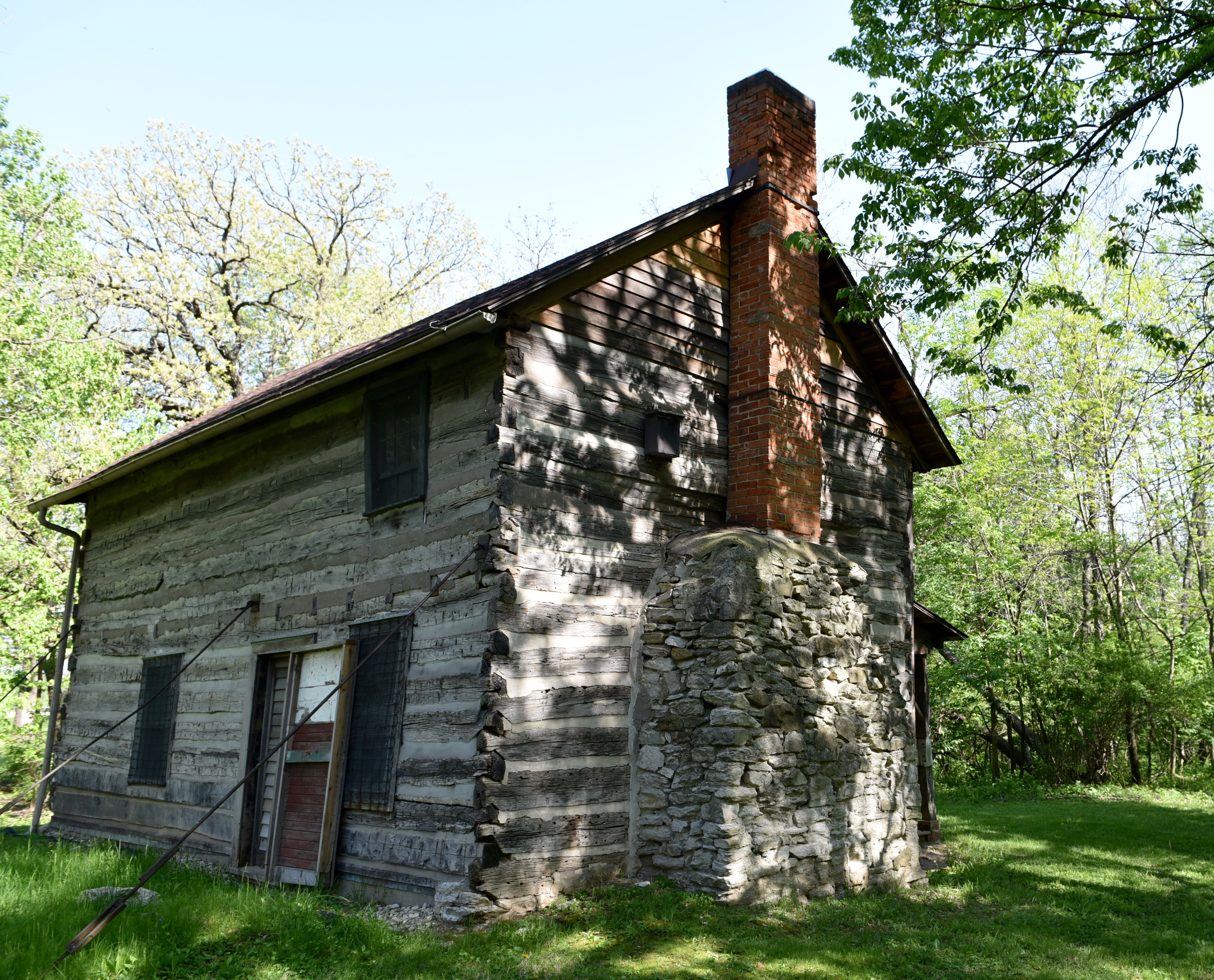
- Rhodham Bonnifield House

- Location within Iowa Location within the United States
- Location: B St. Fairfield, Iowa
- Coordinates: 41°01′08″N 91°57′24″W
- Area: 1.5 acres (0.61 ha)
- NRHP reference No.: 86001601
- Added to NRHP: August 14, 1986

Old Settlers' Association Park and Rhodham Bonnifield House, also known as Old Settlers' Park and Bonnifield Cabin, is a nationally recognized historic district located in Fairfield, Iowa, United States. It was listed on the National Register of Historic Places in 1986. The park was established in 1907 as a preserve for the grasses, flowers and animals native to this area. It was also meant to memorialize the pioneers to Jefferson County and the sentiments of "freedom and equality, hospitality, sympathy and love of fair play" that motivated them. The focal point of the park is the Rhodham Bonnifield House, a log cabin built in 1838 in Round Prairie Township. It was used as a residence until 1902, and moved here when the park was established. This is the first park of its kind established in eastern Iowa. The house's historic designation is attributed to its 1907 reconstruction, and not its original construction. There are few pioneer log structures in Iowa that remain in their original setting. Those that remain have been reconstructed at another site to preserve them.
