= Sperry, Iowa =

- Census-designated place
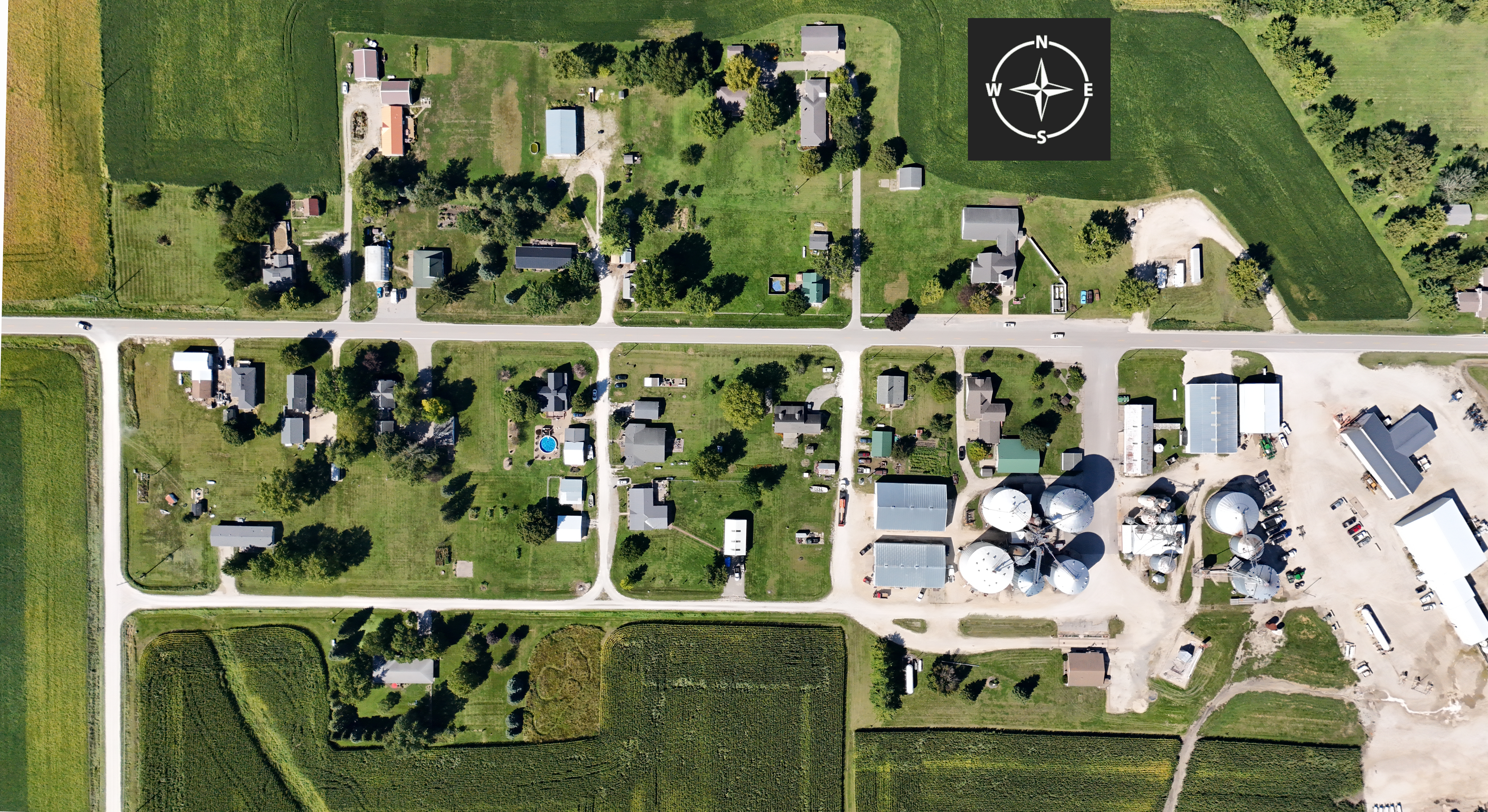
- An aerial photograph of Sperry

- Location within the state of Iowa Sperry (the United States)
- Coordinates: 40°57′26″N 91°09′20″W
- Country: United States
- State: Iowa
- County: Des Moines

Area
  - Total: 2.24 sq mi (5.80 km^{2})
  - Land: 2.24 sq mi (5.79 km^{2})
  - Water: 0 sq mi (0.00 km^{2})
- Elevation: 751 ft (229 m)

Population (2020)
  - Total: 124
  - Density: 55/sq mi (21.4/km^{2})
- Time zone: UTC-6 (Central (CST))
  - Summer (DST): UTC-5 (CDT)
- ZIP codes: 52650
- Area code: 319
- FIPS code: 19-74325
- GNIS feature ID: 2804129

Sperry is an unincorporated community and census-designated place (CDP) in central Des Moines County, Iowa, United States. It lies along local roads north of the city of Burlington, the county seat of Des Moines County. Its elevation is 751 feet (229 m). Although Sperry is unincorporated, it has a post office with the ZIP code of 52650, which opened on 5 February 1870.

As of the 2020 census, Sperry had a population of 124.

The community is part of the Burlington, IA–IL Micropolitan Statistical Area.

== Demographics ==
Historical population
Census	Pop.	Note	%±
2020	124		—
U.S. Decennial Census

=== 2020 census ===
As of the census of 2020, there were 124 people, 52 households, and 44 families residing in the community. The population density was 55.4 inhabitants per square mile (21.4/km^{2}). There were 52 housing units at an average density of 23.2 per square mile (9.0/km^{2}). The racial makeup of the community was 98.4% White, 0.0% Black or African American, 0.0% Native American, 0.0% Asian, 0.0% Pacific Islander, 0.0% from other races and 1.6% from two or more races. Hispanic or Latino persons of any race comprised 0.0% of the population.

Of the 52 households, 19.2% of which had children under the age of 18 living with them, 73.1% were married couples living together, 3.8% were cohabitating couples, 17.3% had a female householder with no spouse or partner present and 5.8% had a male householder with no spouse or partner present. 15.4% of all households were non-families. 15.4% of all households were made up of individuals, 15.4% had someone living alone who was 65 years old or older.

The median age in the community was 43.3 years. 25.0% of the residents were under the age of 20; 2.4% were between the ages of 20 and 24; 24.2% were from 25 and 44; 22.6% were from 45 and 64; and 25.8% were 65 years of age or older. The gender makeup of the community was 37.9% male and 62.1% female.

== History ==
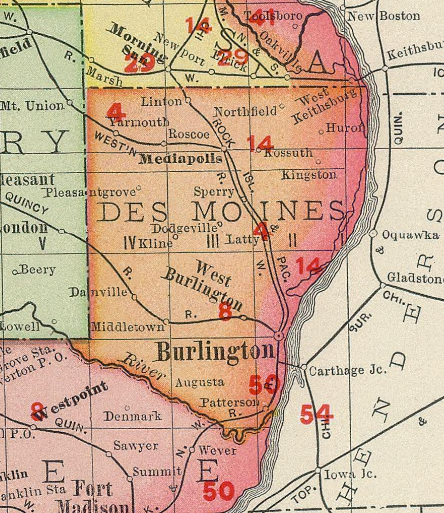
Sperry in Des Moines County Iowa, in 1903

Sperry got its start in the year 1869, when John M. Sperry settled there and opened a post office.

Sperry was a station stop on the Burlington, Cedar Rapids and Northern Railway later a part of the Chicago, Rock Island and Pacific Railroad; construction of the line began in 1869. This line was also used by the Burlington and Northwestern Railway system, later part of the Chicago, Burlington and Quincy Railroad. All service on the line by both the Rock Island and Burlington systems ended in 1980.

Sperry's population was 88 in 1902, and 75 in 1925. The population was 75 in 1940.
