= Lynnville, Iowa =

- City
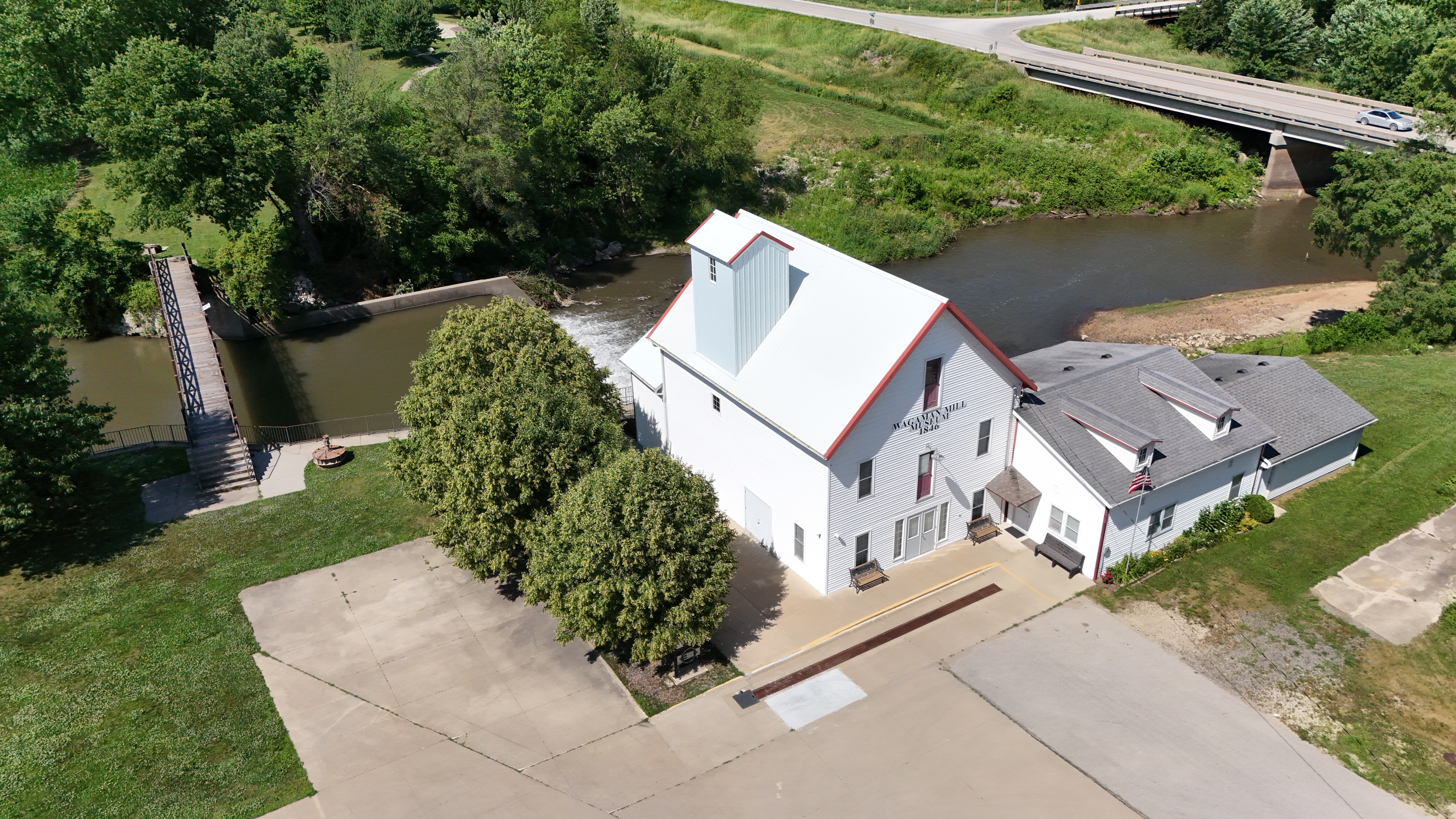
- The Wagaman Mill Museum in Lynnville

- Location of Lynnville, Iowa
- Coordinates: 41°34′41″N 92°47′8″W
- Country: United States
- State: Iowa
- County: Jasper

Area
  - Total: 1.10 sq mi (2.85 km^{2})
  - Land: 1.10 sq mi (2.85 km^{2})
  - Water: 0 sq mi (0.00 km^{2})
- Elevation: 830 ft (253 m)

Population (2020)
  - Total: 380
  - Density: 345.9/sq mi (133.54/km^{2})
- Time zone: UTC-6 (Central (CST))
  - Summer (DST): UTC-5 (CDT)
- ZIP code: 50153
- Area code: 641
- FIPS code: 19-47595
- GNIS feature ID: 0458694
- Website: www.lynnvilleiowa.com

Lynnville is a city in Jasper County, Iowa, United States. The population was 380 at the time of the 2020 census.

== History ==
Lynnville was laid out in 1856. The town was named for a linden grove near the original town site. Lynnville was incorporated in 1875.

== Geography ==
Lynnville is located at 41°34′41″N 92°47′8″W (41.577958, -92.785568).

According to the United States Census Bureau, the city has a total area of 1.11 square miles (2.87 km^{2}), all land.

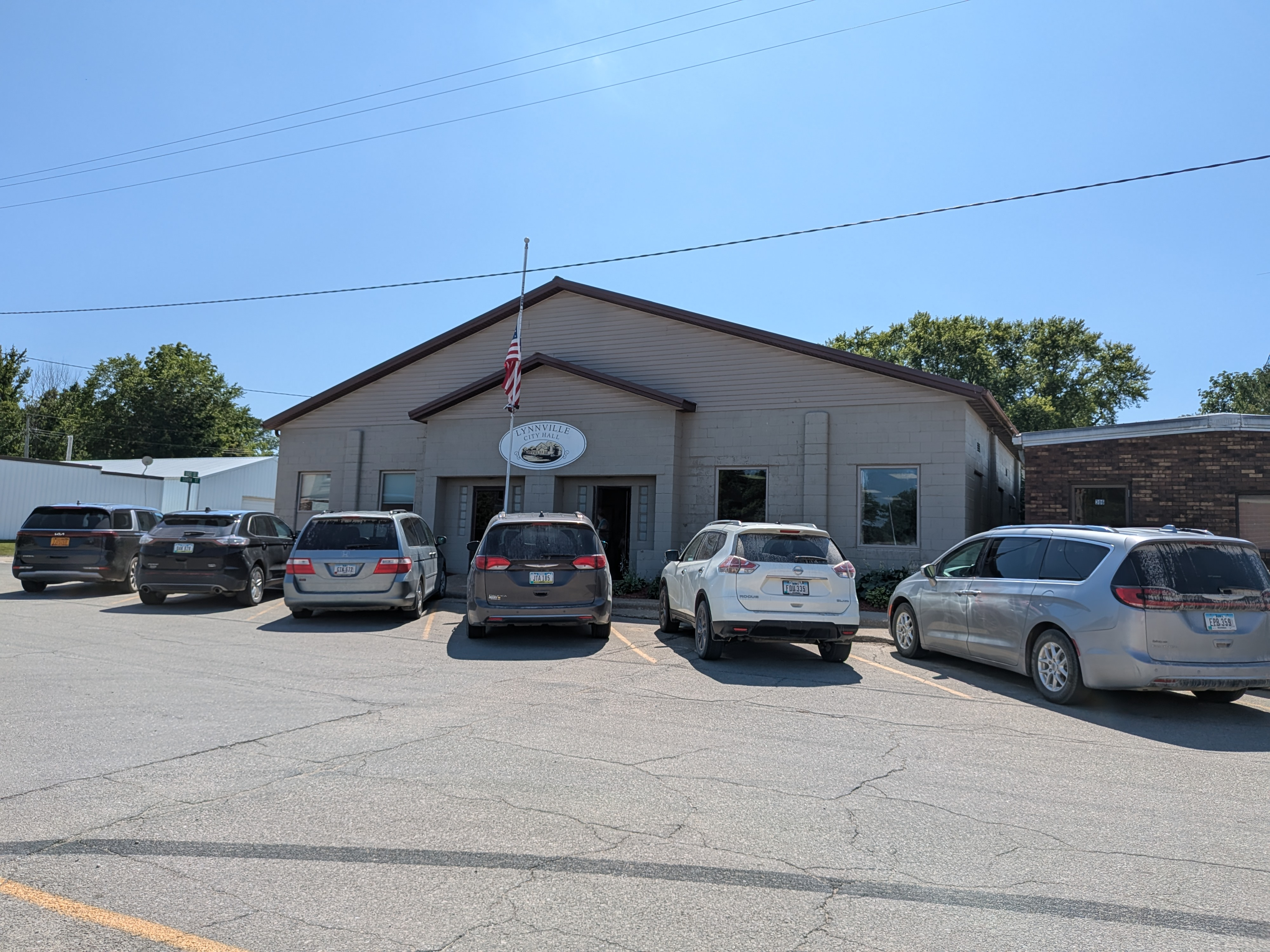
Lynnville City Hall

== Demographics ==
Historical populations
Year	Pop.	±%
1880	296	—
1890	261	−11.8%
1900	347	+33.0%
1910	370	+6.6%
1920	461	+24.6%
1930	426	−7.6%
1940	427	+0.2%
1950	406	−4.9%
1960	411	+1.2%
1970	381	−7.3%
1980	406	+6.6%
1990	393	−3.2%
2000	366	−6.9%
2010	379	+3.6%
2020	380	+0.3%
Source:"U.S. Census website". United States Census Bureau. and Iowa Data Center; Source: U.S. Decennial Census

=== 2020 census ===
As of the census of 2020, there were 380 people, 160 households, and 116 families residing in the city. The population density was 345.9 inhabitants per square mile (133.5/km^{2}). There were 168 housing units at an average density of 152.9 per square mile (59.0/km^{2}). The racial makeup of the city was 97.6% White, 0.0% Black or African American, 0.0% Native American, 0.0% Asian, 0.0% Pacific Islander, 0.0% from other races and 2.4% from two or more races. Hispanic or Latino persons of any race comprised 1.6% of the population.

Of the 160 households, 25.0% of which had children under the age of 18 living with them, 62.5% were married couples living together, 3.8% were cohabitating couples, 18.8% had a female householder with no spouse or partner present and 15.0% had a male householder with no spouse or partner present. 27.5% of all households were non-families. 23.8% of all households were made up of individuals, 14.4% had someone living alone who was 65 years old or older.

The median age in the city was 45.1 years. 25.0% of the residents were under the age of 20; 2.6% were between the ages of 20 and 24; 22.1% were from 25 and 44; 32.9% were from 45 and 64; and 17.4% were 65 years of age or older. The gender makeup of the city was 51.8% male and 48.2% female.

=== 2010 census ===
As of the census of 2010, there were 379 people, 163 households, and 114 families living in the city. The population density was 341.4 inhabitants per square mile (131.8/km^{2}). There were 174 housing units at an average density of 156.8 per square mile (60.5/km^{2}). The racial makeup of the city was 100.0% White. Hispanic or Latino of any race were 0.8% of the population.

There were 163 households, of which 25.8% had children under the age of 18 living with them, 66.9% were married couples living together, 1.2% had a female householder with no husband present, 1.8% had a male householder with no wife present, and 30.1% were non-families. 28.2% of all households were made up of individuals, and 12.3% had someone living alone who was 65 years of age or older. The average household size was 2.33 and the average family size was 2.83.

The median age in the city was 45.7 years. 23% of residents were under the age of 18; 3.4% were between the ages of 18 and 24; 22.1% were from 25 to 44; 34.1% were from 45 to 64; and 17.4% were 65 years of age or older. The gender makeup of the city was 53.0% male and 47.0% female.

=== 2000 census ===
As of the census of 2000, there were 366 people, 153 households, and 106 families living in the city. The population density was 608.2 inhabitants per square mile (234.8/km^{2}). There were 160 housing units at an average density of 265.9 per square mile (102.7/km^{2}). The racial makeup of the city was 99.73% White and 0.27% Asian. Hispanic or Latino of any race were 0.82% of the population.

There were 153 households, out of which 28.1% had children under the age of 18 living with them, 66.7% were married couples living together, 0.7% had a female householder with no husband present, and 30.1% were non-families. 28.1% of all households were made up of individuals, and 17.0% had someone living alone who was 65 years of age or older. The average household size was 2.39 and the average family size was 2.93.

In the city, the population was spread out, with 23.2% under the age of 18, 6.6% from 18 to 24, 26.5% from 25 to 44, 23.0% from 45 to 64, and 20.8% who were 65 years of age or older. The median age was 42 years. For every 100 females, there were 98.9 males. For every 100 females age 18 and over, there were 100.7 males.

The median income for a household in the city was $39,875, and the median income for a family was $50,750. Males had a median income of $31,750 versus $21,667 for females. The per capita income for the city was $17,976. About 3.7% of families and 4.9% of the population were below the poverty line, including 4.9% of those under age 18 and 4.7% of those age 65 or over.

== Education ==
Lynnville is part of the Lynnville–Sully Community School District.

== Healthcare ==
Lynnville area residents have access to healthcare services at the Lynnville Medical Clinic, located at 303 East St. When hospitalization is required the closest and most convenient hospital for residents is Grinnell Regional Medical Center, located at 210 4th Avenue in Grinnell.
