= Snake Alley =

Snake Alley may refer to:

- Snake Alley (Burlington, Iowa), a sinuous street in Iowa, US
  - Snake Alley Criterium, an annual bicycle race in Burlington
  - Snake Alley Historic District, a largely residential area in Burlington
- Snake Alley (Taipei), a market in Taipei, Taiwan
- "Snake Alley", a track on the 1985 album Decode Yourself by Ronald Shannon Jackson

== See also ==
- Crookedest street (disambiguation)
