= Crookedest street =

Crookedest street may refer to:

- Vermont Street (San Francisco), a sinuous street in San Francisco, California, USA.
- Lombard Street (San Francisco), a sinuous street in San Francisco, California, USA.
- Snake Alley (Burlington, Iowa), a sinuous street in Burlington, Iowa, USA.
