= German Methodist Episcopal Church =

- U.S. National Register of Historic Places
- U.S. Historic district – Contributing property
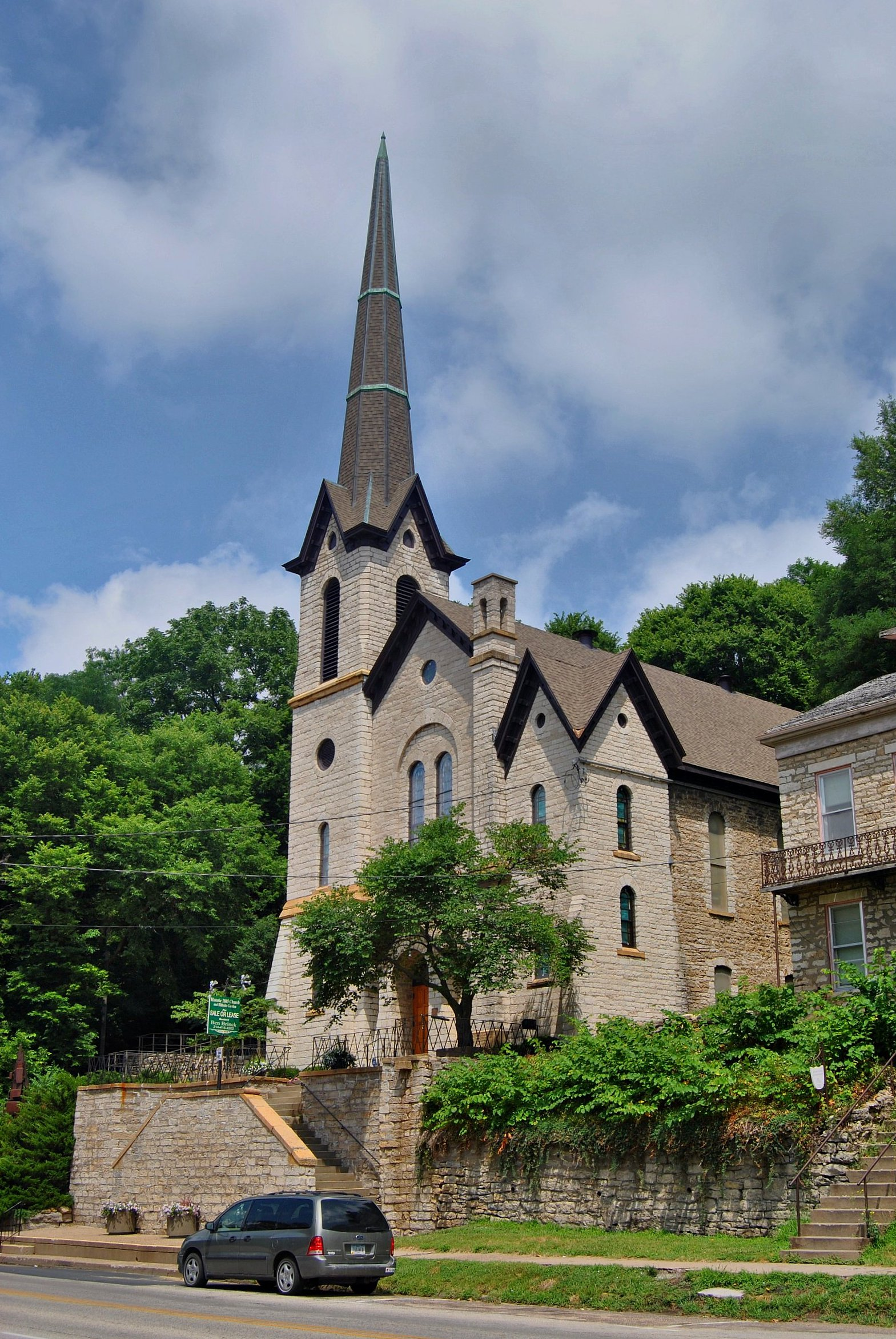
- The German Methodist Episcopal Church in 2011.
- Location: 7th and Washington Sts. Burlington, Iowa
- Coordinates: 40°48′43″N 91°06′24″W
- Area: less than one acre
- Built: 1868-1869
- Architectural style: Gothic Revival
- Part of: Heritage Hill Historic District (ID82000406)
- NRHP reference No.: 77000508
- Added to NRHP: September 22, 1977

The German Methodist Episcopal Church, also known as St. Paul's German Methodist Episcopal Church, is a historic church building in Burlington, Iowa, United States. The German Methodist Episcopal Church was organized in Burlington in 1845. It was the second of eight German congregations established in the city of various denominations. The Reverend Sebastian Barth, the first pastor, initially held services in a small frame house, and then in the basement of another church. The first permanent home for the congregation was a small brick church that was built in 1848. This structure was built from 1868 to 1869. It is a Victorian Gothic structure with Romanesque elements. The stone for the exterior was quarried from the site where the church was built.

Services in English were added in 1905 and all the services were in English by 1916. When the German and American branches of the Methodist church were merged in 1925, St. Paul's congregation was disbanded, and its members were absorbed by other congregations in Burlington. There was a small group that reorganized the German Methodist Episcopal Church at St. Paul's in 1930, but by 1938 the building was sold to the Church of the Nazarene. They occupied it until 1968. The Art Guild of Burlington bought the building in 1973. It was individually listed on the National Register of Historic Places in 1977, and as a contributing property in the Heritage Hill Historic District in 1982.
