= Heritage Hill Historic District (Burlington, Iowa) =

Historic district in Iowa, United States

- U.S. National Register of Historic Places
- U.S. Historic district
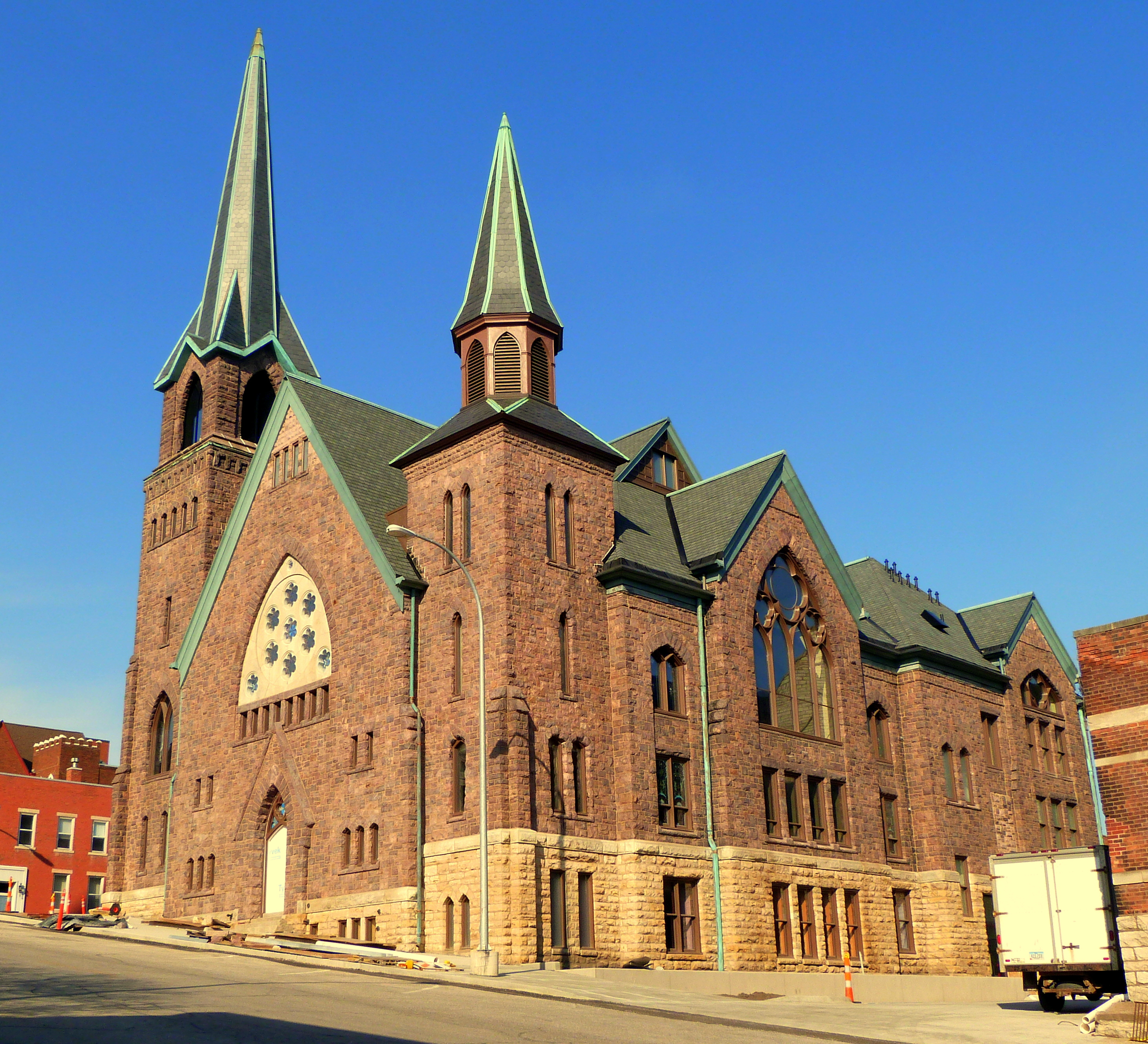
- First United Methodist Church in 2013.

- Location within Iowa Location within the United States
- Location: Roughly bounded by Central Ave. and High, 3rd, and Jefferson Sts., Burlington, Iowa
- Coordinates: 40°48′46″N 91°06′15″W
- NRHP reference No.: 82000406
- Added to NRHP: December 21, 1982

The Heritage Hill Historic District is a nationally recognized historic district located north of downtown Burlington, Iowa, United States. It was listed on the National Register of Historic Places in 1982. The area is primarily a residential neighborhood on the hill north of the central business district. Several churches act as a buffer and provide a transition from the residential area and the commercial areas in the valley. At the time of its nomination there were 141 structures in the district. The breakdown of their uses at that time included: 113 residences, 10 churches or religious use facilities, 7 public or government buildings, and 11 commercial structures. The district also includes North Hill Park, which has been in continuous use since the city was founded in 1836 and is one of the two oldest city parks in Burlington.

== Contributing properties ==
- Burlington Public Library
- Christ Episcopal Church
- First Congregational Church
- German Methodist Episcopal Church
- St. Paul's Catholic Church
- Snake Alley
- Snake Alley Historic District

== See also ==
- National Register of Historic Places listings in Des Moines County, Iowa
- Media related to Heritage Hill Historic District at Wikimedia Commons
