= Burlington and Missouri River Railroad Passenger Station =

- U.S. National Register of Historic Places
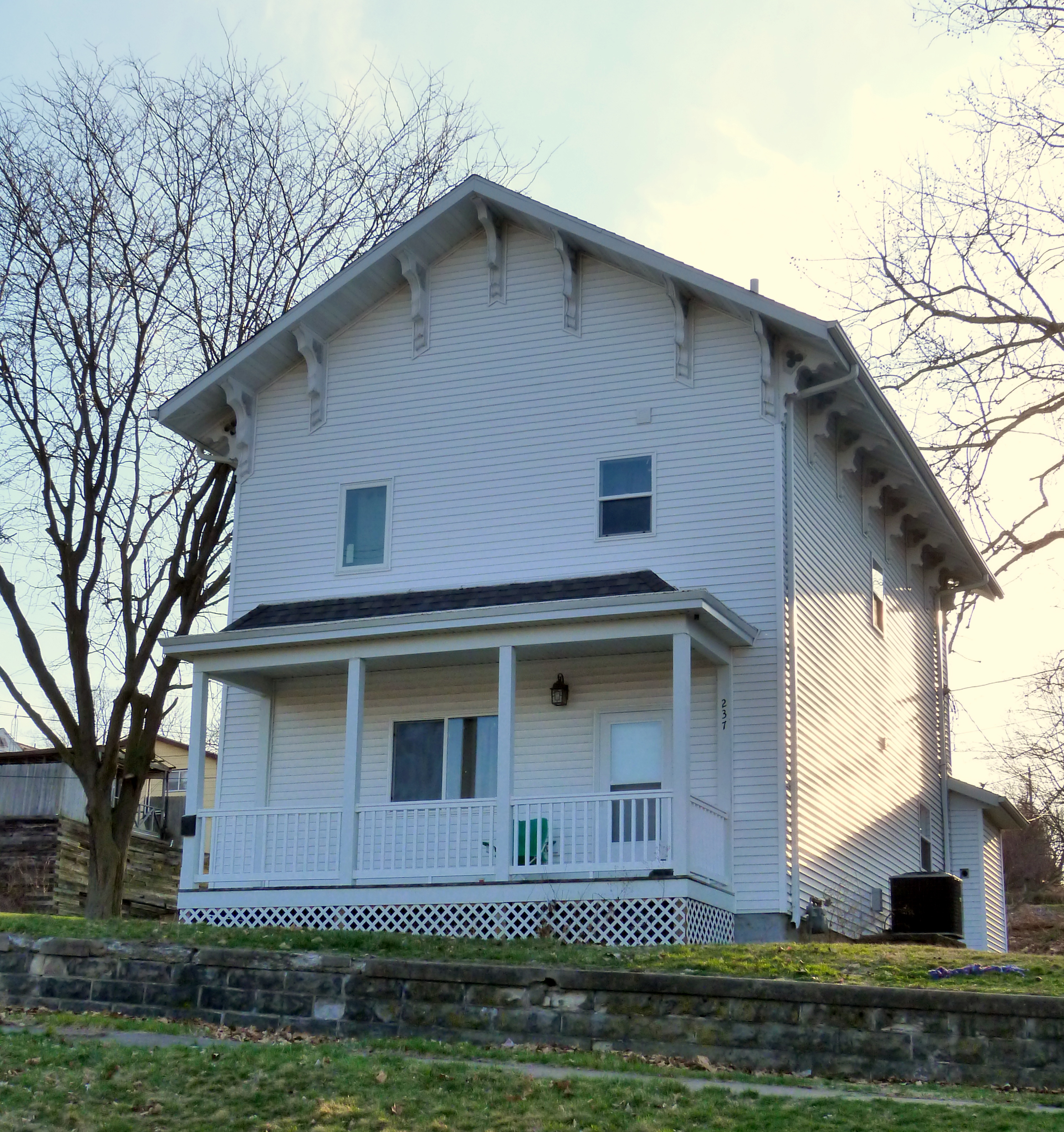

- Location within Iowa Location within the United States
- Location: 237 S. 4th St. Burlington, Iowa
- Coordinates: 40°48′21.73″N 91°06′18.1″W
- Built: 1856
- Architectural style: Italianate
- NRHP reference No.: 76000761
- Added to NRHP: August 25, 1988

The Burlington and Missouri River Railroad Passenger Station is a historic building located in Burlington, Iowa, United States. The station was built by the Burlington and Missouri River Railroad in 1856. It is the oldest train depot in the upper Midwest that is still standing west of the Mississippi River.

The building served as a passenger station until 1868 when the railroad bridge over the Mississippi River was completed and a larger station in Burlington was required. Prior to that year a transfer ferry boat, the President, carried railroad cars and passengers across the river in warmer weather. Passengers would have to walk across the river ice in winter. The railroad continued to use the building for office space until 1884. In that year the frame, Italianate structure was moved from its Main and Market Streets location so the railroad tracks could be widened. After its use by the railroad, it was converted into a residence. The house that presently sits next door to this one is the old baggage building that was moved at the same time and converted for residential use. The building was listed on the National Register of Historic Places in 1976.
