= St. Paul's Catholic Church (Burlington, Iowa) =

- St. Paul's Roman Catholic Church and Rectory
- U.S. Historic district – Contributing property
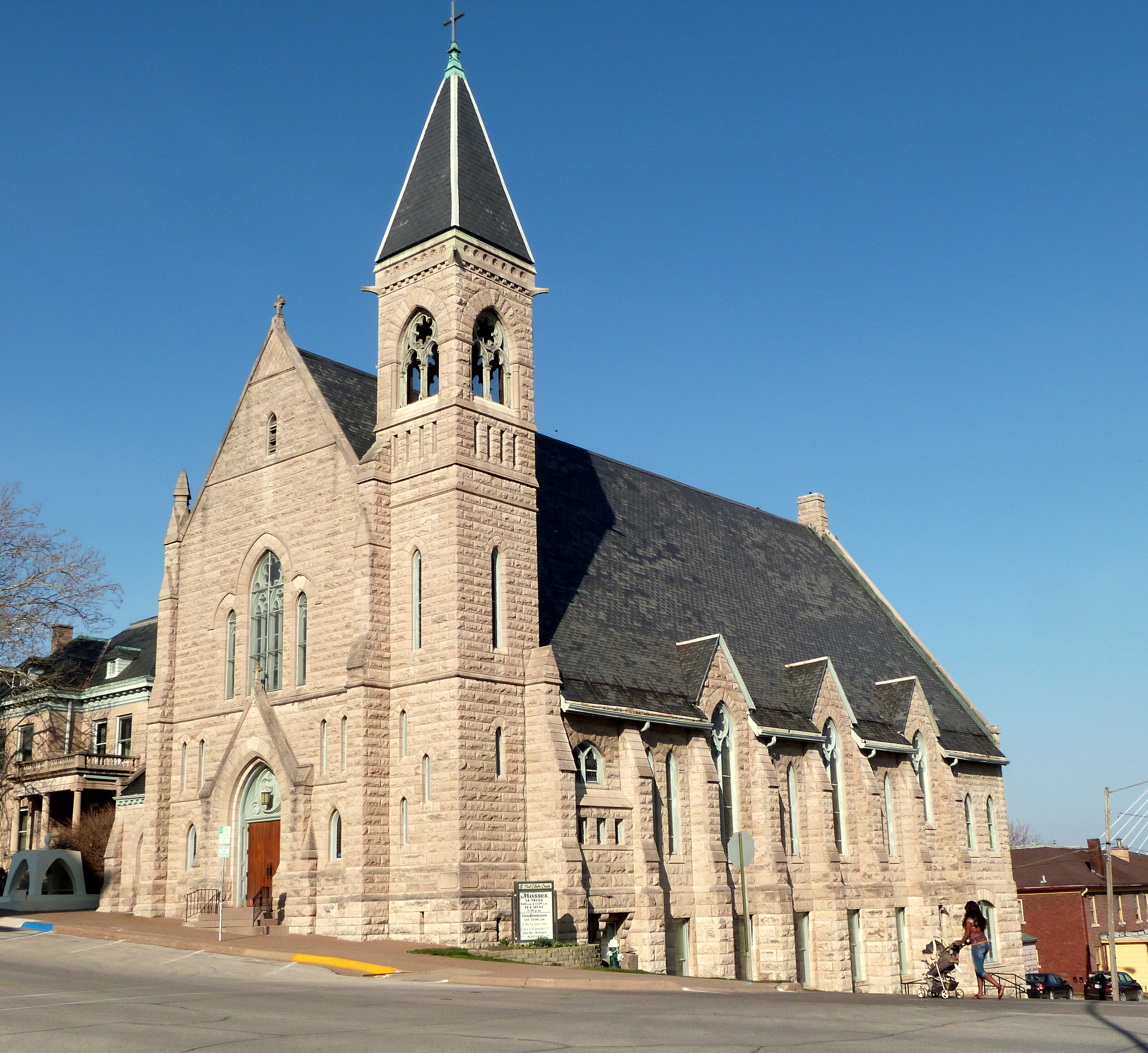
- St. Paul's Church in 2013

- Location within Iowa Location within the United States
- Location: 508 N. 4th St. Burlington, Iowa
- Coordinates: 40°48′43.32″N 91°6′10.11″W
- Area: 2.35 acres (0.95 ha)
- Built: 1892-1895 (church); 1902-1904 (rectory)
- Architect: James J. Egan
- Architectural style: Gothic Revival (church); Georgian Revival (rectory)
- Part of: Heritage Hill Historic District (ID82000406)
- Added to NRHP: December 21, 1982

St. Paul's Catholic Church is a historic church building located in Burlington, Iowa, United States. Together with the Church of St. John the Baptist in Burlington and St Mary's Church in West Burlington it forms Divine Mercy parish, which is a part of the Diocese of Davenport. The parish maintains the former parish church buildings as worship sites. St. Paul's Church and the rectory are contributing properties in the Heritage Hill Historic District listed on the National Register of Historic Places. St. Paul's School was also a contributing property in the historic district, but it has subsequently been torn down.

== History ==
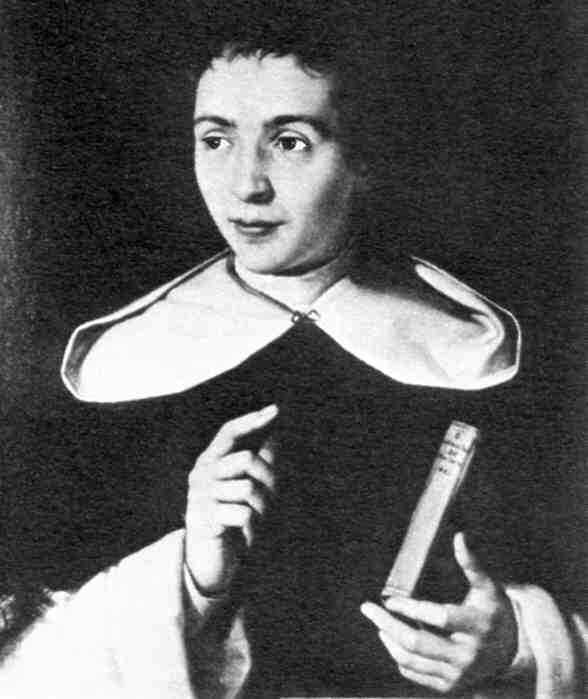
Rev. Samuel Charles Mazzuchelli, OP

With the establishment of the Wisconsin Territory in 1836, the town of Burlington was chosen as one of the temporary capitals of the territory. With the establishment of the Iowa Territory in 1838, the town became its first capital. Bishop Mathias Loras and the Rev. Samuel Charles Mazzuchelli, OP, recognized the importance of the community. There were, however, few Catholics in the area when Mazzuchelli was dispatched to Burlington to buy land in 1839 and establish St. Paul's Church. A small brick church building was constructed 1840-1841. It was located where the back of the present church is located. The first church bell in Burlington arrived in 1842. The building was leased to the territorial legislature for 60 days for their use. As a way to strengthen Catholicism in the area Loras chose St. Paul's as the location for the ordination of the Rev. Anthony Godfert, whom Loras had recruited from France. It was also to Burlington that Loras fled when tempers flared between the Irish and German Catholics of Dubuque. He sent St. Paul's pastor, the Rev. John Healy, an Irish immigrant himself, to calm tensions, which he could not do.

The Burlington area was served regularly by a visiting priest after Loras left town, especially the Rev. J.A.M. Pelamourgues of St. Anthony's in Davenport. The Rev. John Alleman, arrived in 1847. The town by then had become a hotbed for anti-Catholic, anti-clerical, and nativist thinking. Many of the people who harbored these beliefs had moved to Burlington from the eastern United States where such thinking was rampant. Alleman stayed a couple of years until the arrival of the Rev. George Reffe, who started Burlington's first parochial school in the church basement in 1849. The Sisters of Charity of the Blessed Virgin Mary started teaching at St. Paul's in 1859. The parish's second church building, a brick English Gothic-styled structure, was completed in 1863.

The present St. Paul's Church was designed by Chicago architect James J. Egan in the High Victorian Gothic Revival style. He had previously designed Sacred Heart Cathedral in Davenport, and St. Ambrose Cathedral in Des Moines. All three churches, while distinct, have many of the same features. The cornerstone was laid on October 23, 1892. The Rev. Bernard Mackin was the pastor at the time. St. Paul's was built by John Loftus and completed in 1895. It was dedicated on January 27, 1895. The church was damaged by a fire in 1946 and the interior had to be gutted and rebuilt.

The first merger of the Catholic Community in Burlington happened in the parochial schools. Both St. Paul's and St. John's operated parish-based high schools. Those separate operations merged in 1958 with the opening of Notre Dame High School on the city's west side. The two parishes continued to operate their own grade schools until 1975 when they were consolidated. St. Paul's School was the site for kindergarten through 4th Grade and St. John's housed grades five through eight. The school at Burlington's third parish, St. Patrick's, and the school at St. Mary's in West Burlington had both closed in 1969. In the 1990s a fund drive was held and a new grade school wing was added at Notre Dame.

The number of clergy in the Davenport Diocese has declined steadily since the 1960s. Demographics and religious practice in the Burlington Community also changed. Bishop Gerald O’Keefe announced a plan in 1991 to consolidate parishes throughout the diocese, and the parishes in Burlington were part of that plan. In 1998 St. Paul's and St. John's were consolidated under the leadership of the Rev. John Hyland, who had been the pastor at both parishes since 1996. The new parish name was a combination of the two parishes: Saints John and Paul. St. Patrick's and St. Mary's consolidated at the same time to form their own parish. In 2017 Saints John and Paul parish and St. Mary and St. Patrick parishes merged to form Divine Mercy parish.

== Architecture ==
St. Paul's Church is constructed of Bedford limestone and the exterior features a corner tower on the right side of the facade that rises to 100 feet (30 m). The original church bell from 1842 is in the tower. The church is located on a corner lot at the top of an embankment, which gives it prominence. It also allows for the basement to be exposed in the back of the church building. The side bays of the church are separated by prominent buttresses. Three gables break up the roofline on the side elevations. Tracery and paired lancet windows alternate down the side elevations with the tracery windows in the bays with the gables. Above the main entrance is a tall tracery window that is flanked by two shorter lancet windows. The interior is a large open expanse without pillars. The pews are arranged in four sections across the interior. The vaulted ceiling is supported by heavy hardwood hammer beams. The altar is framed by a tall Pointed arch. It is flanked by alcoves that hold shrines. On the left side is the tabernacle with a statue of the Sacred Heart of Jesus above it. To the right is a shrine with statues of the Blessed Virgin Mary and Saint Joseph. Above the altar are three stained glass windows. The taller central window features an image of Saint Paul the Apostle. A pipe organ is located in the gallery in the back.

St. Paul's Rectory, which is located next door to the church, was designed by Egan & Prindeville. Built between 1902 and 1904 in the Georgian Revival style, it is a two-story house that features a steeply pitched, multiple hipped roof covered in slate. Small dormers are located on all sides of the roof and modillion blocks are located under the eaves. Tall stone chimneys rise above the roofline. The exterior is covered with smooth-faced, coursed ashlar that alternates with a narrow course of rusticated ashlar. The structure is basically rectangular in shape, however, the north half of the main facade projects slightly from the rest of the house. The balustraded front porch is supported by three plain columns. A columned porch on the southeast corner of the house has been screened-in. A modern addition was added to the back of the house and extends the length of the back porch.
