= Church of St. John the Baptist (Burlington, Iowa) =

- U.S. National Register of Historic Places
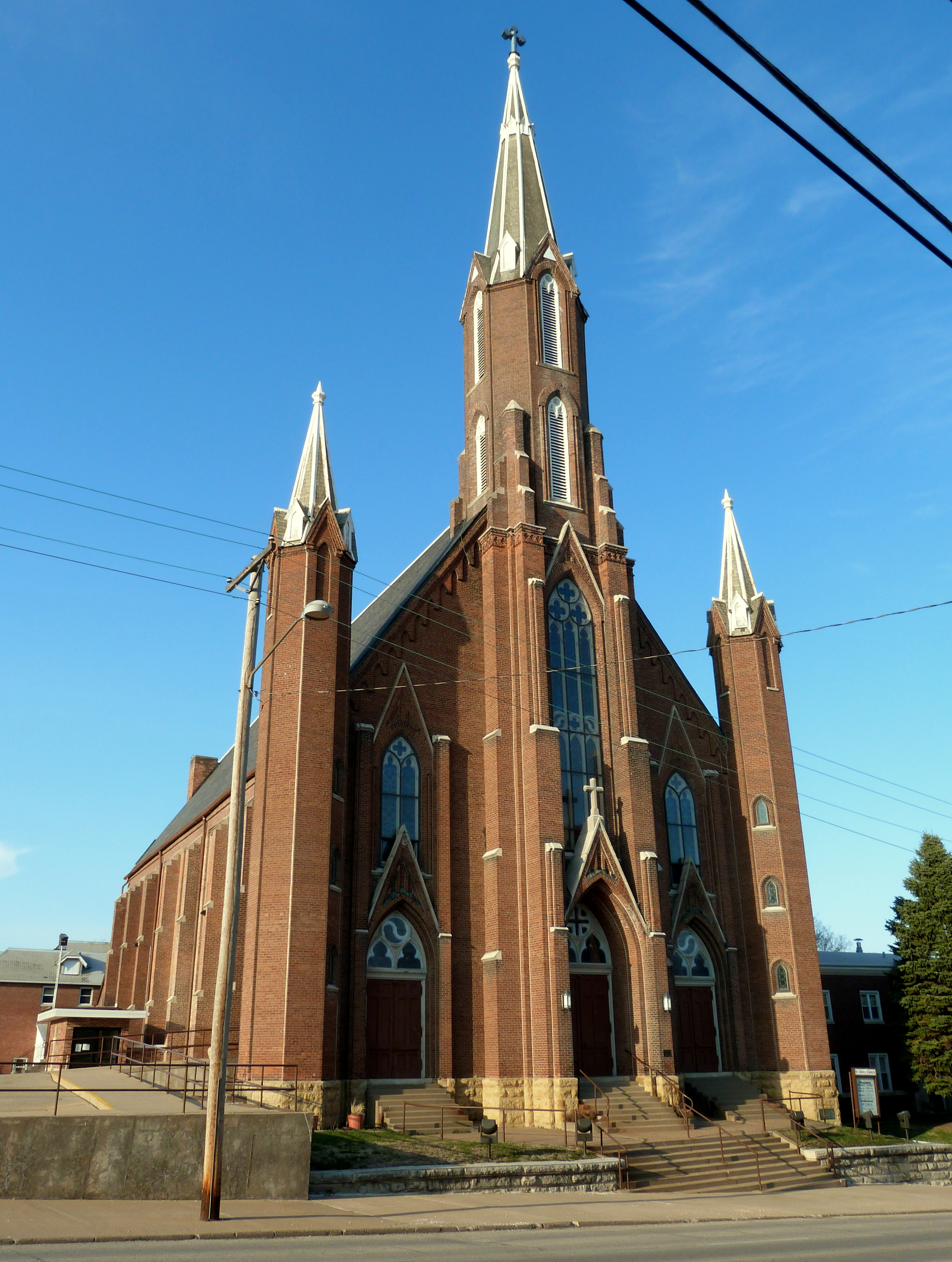
- The Church of St John the Baptist in 2013.

- Location within Iowa Location within the United States
- Location: 712 Division St. Burlington, Iowa
- Coordinates: 40°48′27.97″N 91°6′31.83″W
- Area: 2 acres (0.81 ha)
- Built: 1883–1885
- Architect: Johann Dillenburg
- Architectural style: Gothic Revival
- NRHP reference No.: 82002615
- Added to NRHP: February 26, 1982

The Church of St. John the Baptist is a historic church building located in Burlington, Iowa, United States. Together with St. Paul's Church in Burlington and St Mary's Church in West Burlington it forms Divine Mercy parish, which is a part of the Diocese of Davenport. The parish maintains the former parish church buildings as worship sites. St. John's was listed on the National Register of Historic Places in 1982.

== History ==
St. John the Baptist parish was started in 1852 to serve the town's growing German community. Father Reffe, who had previously been at St Paul's, was assigned as St. John's first pastor. A church was finished by 1856 when there were forty to fifty families in the parish. They were part of the large number of German immigrants who settled in Burlington in the 1840s and 1850s. A school building was completed the following year and the School Sisters of Notre Dame served as teachers. St. John's Academy was completed in 1875. By 1879 the parish had grown to 200 families, and by 1888 it had 2,000 individual members. Its growth reflected that by the 1880s, 60% of Burlington's population were ethnic Germans.

In 1876 Bishop John Hennessey of Dubuque gave the pastoral care of the parish to the Jesuits. They were later followed by Benedictines from St. Benedict's Abbey in Atchison, Kansas. Priests from the Davenport Diocese, which the parish became a part of in 1881, started serving the parish in 1990.

The first merger of the Catholic Community in Burlington happened in the parochial schools. Both St. John's and St. Paul's operated parish-based high schools. Those separate operations merged in 1958 with the opening of Notre Dame High School on the city's west side. The two parishes continued to operate their own grade schools until 1975 when they were consolidated. St. Paul's School was the site for kindergarten through 4th Grade and St. John's housed grades five through eight. The school at Burlington's third parish, St. Patrick's, and the school at St. Mary's in West Burlington had both closed in 1969. In the 1990s a fund drive was held and a new grade school wing was added at Notre Dame. St. John's School was torn down to make room for more parking.

The number of clergy in the Davenport Diocese has declined steadily since the 1960s. Demographics and religious practice in the Burlington Community also changed. Bishop Gerald O’Keefe announced a plan in 1991 to consolidate parishes throughout the diocese, and the parishes in Burlington were part of that plan. In 1998 St. John's and St. Paul's were consolidated under the leadership of the Rev. John Hyland, who had been the pastor of both parishes. The new parish name was a combination of the two parishes: Saints John and Paul. St. Patrick's and St. Mary's consolidated at the same time to form their own parish. In 2017 Saints John and Paul parish and St. Mary and St. Patrick parish merged to form Divine Mercy parish.

== Architecture ==
The current St. John's Church was built between 1883 and 1885. It was designed by Chicago architect Johann Dillenburg in the Gothic Revival style. The structure is built on a high basement of rough-hewn stone and the exterior walls are composed of brick. The gable roof is covered with slate. The church measures 160-by-73-foot (49 by 22 m). The exterior features a tall central tower with two smaller towers flanking it on either side of the facade. The tallest tower rises 168 feet (51 m). Lights were put on the church's tower in 2010. There are three entrances across the front of the building. Above each of the entrances is a lancet window. The side elevation of the church is seven bays wide. Each bay is divided by a three-stepped wall buttress. There is a paired lancet window in each bay that is set within an indented rectangular panel. Across the top of each panel is a course of dentils. A rounded apse dominates the rear of the church. The church was built at the top of a high bluff south of the downtown area, which gives the structure prominence.

The interior is divided into three naves, which are divided by pillars. A tall wooden high altar fills the apse of the church. It was installed in 1893. A Eucharistic Chapel was constructed in the left side sacristy in the 1990s. An arched doorway was cut into the sanctuary wall leading to the chapel and allowing it to be visible from the main body of the church. All of the windows are filled with stained glass.
