= Robert Bierstedt =

American sociologist

Robert Bierstedt (1913–1998) was an American sociologist who wrote about sociological theory, culture, and constitutional law. He was from Burlington, Iowa, and graduated in philosophy from the University of Iowa in 1934. He received a master's degree in philosophy in 1935 and a doctorate in sociology in 1946 from Columbia University.

He headed the department of sociology at City College of New York and at New York University before becoming emeritus professor of sociology at the University of Virginia. He was a student of the Russian-American sociologist Pitirim Sorokin when he was a visiting graduate student at Harvard University during the 1930s. Bierstedt served as vice-president of the American Sociological Association when Sorokin was elected president.

Bierstedt was a longtime director of the American Civil Liberties Union, serving as chairman of its academic freedom committee and the church-state committee in the 1960s and 1970s. In addition, he was a former director of the American Council of Learned Societies, a federation of scholarly groups focused on the humanities, and president of the Eastern Sociological Society. In his 1959 presidential address "Sociology and Humane Learning" to the Eastern Sociological Society he argued for the role of debate in sociology and the importance of what he referred to as the "theoretic bias" in interpreting social phenomena.

Bierstedt was a rationalist, critiquing what he saw as the prevalent empiricism of his time. In a paper read before the Illinois Academy of Science in 1949, he argued: "Aristotle's Politics is one of the classic works of Western civilization not because of what it tells us about the electoral machinery of the Greek city states in the fourth century before Christ, but because of its observations on the origins and functions of government."

He also held Fulbright Senior Lectureships at Edinburgh University and the London School of Economics.

He died on September 8, 1998, at Martha Jefferson Hospital in Charlottesville, Virginia, at 85.

== Books ==
- Durkheim, Emile; Bierstedt, Robert (1969). Emile Durkheim: Selections from His Works Together with a Brief Biography by Robert Bierstedt. Orion. ISBN 978-0-297-17985-6.
- Znaniecki, Florian (1969). Robert Bierstedt (ed.). On Humanistic Sociology: Selected Papers. University of Chicago Press. ISBN 978-0-226-98842-9.
- Bierstedt, Robert (1974). Power and Progress: Essays on Sociological Theory. McGraw-Hill. ISBN 978-0-07-005230-7.
- Bierstedt, Robert (1974). The Social Order. McGraw-Hill Education. ISBN 978-0-07-005248-2.
- Znaniecki, Florian (1980). Robert Bierstedt (ed.). Cultural Sciences: Their Origin and Development. Transaction. ISBN 978-0-87855-689-2.
- Bierstedt, Robert (1981). American Sociological Theory: A Critical History. Academic Press. ISBN 978-0-12-097482-5.
