= First Congregational Church (Burlington, Iowa) =

- U.S. National Register of Historic Places
- U.S. Historic district – Contributing property
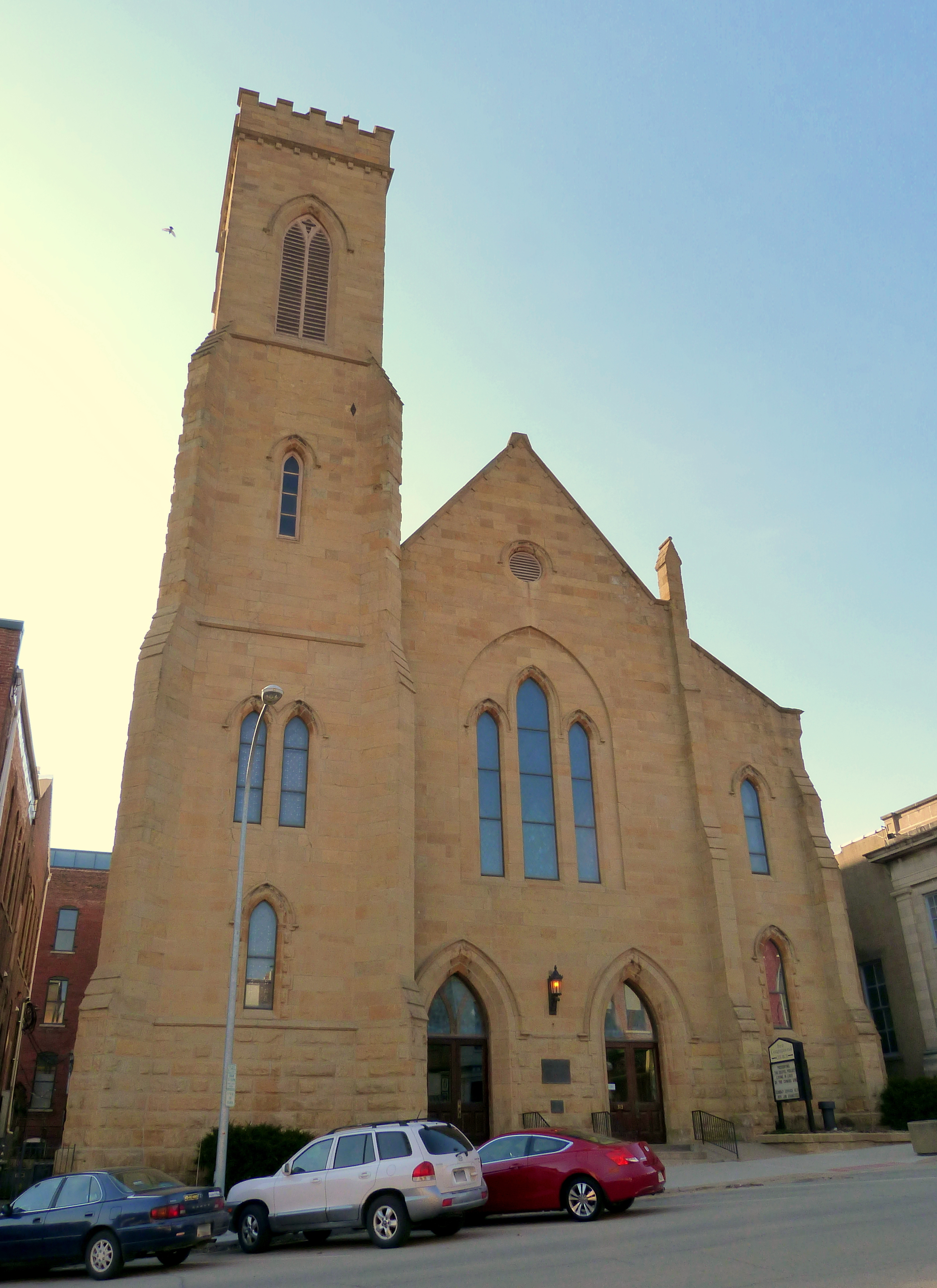
- The First Congregational Church in 2013.

- Location within Iowa Location within the United States
- Location: 313 N. 4th Street; Burlington, Iowa
- Coordinates: 40°48′38″N 91°06′14″W
- Area: less than one acre
- Built: 1867–1870
- Architect: C.A. Dunham; William Salter
- Architectural style: Gothic Revival
- Part of: Heritage Hill Historic District (ID82000406)
- NRHP reference No.: 76000763
- Added to NRHP: November 21, 1976

First Congregational Church is located in Burlington, Iowa, United States. It was listed on the National Register of Historic Places in 1976. The church is also a contributing property in the Heritage Hill Historic District.

== History ==
The congregation was organized in 1838. The Rev. Horace Hutchinson was the first pastor and the congregation met in the home of James G. Edwards who was the publisher of the Burlington Hawk-Eye. He was succeeded by the Rev. William Salter who served here for 64 years (1846-1910). The congregation was involved in social ministry, civil rights, public education, and free libraries. Under Salter's leadership, it was a champion of the abolition of slavery and was a stop on the Underground Railroad.

When the General Council of Congregational Christian Churches merged with the Evangelical and Reformed Church and formed the United Church of Christ, First Congregational Church joined with about 200 other Congregational Christian churches in choosing not to join the merger, mainly because of the issue of congregational polity. It became a part of the National Association of Congregational Christian Churches, which was created in 1955. The church is a member of the National Association, the Iowa-Nebraska Association of Congregational Churches and the Burlington Area Council of Churches.

== Architecture ==
The church building was constructed from 1867 to 1870. It is a Gothic Revival built of dressed dolomite. It is dominated by a tall, square, crenelated corner tower. It rises in three stages, which are separated by belt courses.
