= Karl C. Leebrick =

American university president (1885–1982)

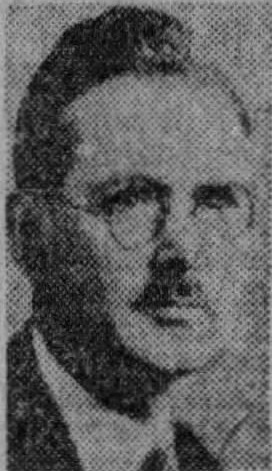
- Born: Karl Clayton Leebrick; October 20, 1885; Burlington, Iowa, US
- Died: June 13, 1982 (aged 96); Kula, Hawaii, US
- Occupations: Academic and university president
- Employer(s): University of California, Berkeley; University of Hawaiʻi; Syracuse University; Kent State University; Moanaolu Community Junior College

Academic background
- Education: University of California, Berkeley, B.S., M.S., Ph.D

Academic work
- Discipline: History and Political Science

Karl Clayton Leebrick (October 20, 1885 – June 13, 1982) was an American academic and academic administrator. He was the president of Kent State University and the first president of Moanaolu Community Junior College. He was also the vice president of the University of Hawaiʻi and dean of the College of Liberal Arts at Syracuse University.

== Early life ==
Leebrick was born on October 20, 1885 in Burlington, Iowa. Soon after, his family moved to Mesa, Arizona. His parents were Mary D. (née Rosenberger) and John Phillip Leebrick. His father died in 1905.

Leebrick attended the Tempe Normal School for four years, riding to class on horseback and graduating in 1906. In 1907, Leebrick and his mother moved to Covina, California. In the 1907 spring term, Leebrick became a teacher and the principal of the North Clifton Public School in Clifton, Arizona. In the fall of 1907, he became the principl of the grammar school in Covina, California. He resigned in May 1909 to enter college.

In 1909, Leebrick enrolled in the University of California, where he studied law and English. He graduated with a degree in history and 1911 and a Bachelor of Science from the College of Natural Sciences in May 1912. While an undergraduate, Leebrick wa a member of Acacia Fraternity.

Leebrick enrolled as a graduate student of social sciences at the University of California. He won the Bryce Historial Essay Prize in May 1912, earning a teaching fellowhship in history at the university. He graduated with a M.S. from the College of Natural Sciences in May 1913. In the fall of 1913, he was the secretary of history professor H. Morse Stephens.

In 1915, Leebrick was working on a doctorate in history. He received a university fellowship in Pacific coast history in May 1915. In August 1915, he went to Seville, Spain to conduct research in archives on Spanish-California history. His trip was funded through a Native Sons' travelling fellowship. The information found during his studies was copies and housed at Bancroft Library. Leebrick completed his Ph.D. in 1917.

== Career ==
In July 1916, Leebrick was hired as an instructor history at the University of California. In 1917, he contributed a paper to The Pacific Coast in History, edited by H. Morse Stephens and Herbert Eugene Bolton. Leebrick was promoted to assistant professor of history in April 1918.

Leebrick was the head of the Department of History and Political Science at the University of Hawaiʻi from August 1920 to 1928. During this period, he was a regular contributor to the Political Science Quarterly. In 1924, he was the invitational speaker for the Japan American Society in Japan.

In January 1928, he took a sabbtical to teach international relations at Syracuse University School of Citizenship and Public Affairs. In January 1929, Leebrick announced his plans to return to the University of Hawaiʻi in September. However, in April 1929, he resigned his position with Hawaiʻi i to become dean of the College of Liberal Arts at Syracuse. While at Syracuse, he was the faculty advisor of Alpha Phi Omega service fraternity.

Leebrick was also the director of the Pacific Institute of International Relations, which convened at the University of Washington in July 1928 and at the University of Southern California in December 1928 and 1929. In December 1928, he joined the faculty of the University of Southern California's new College on International Relations.

On February 4, 1938, Leebrick was elected to become the president of Kent State University. On July 1, 1938, he began his new role as the fourth president of Kent State. He was inaugurated on October 21, 1938. Leebrick focused the university's curriculum on the liberal arts and removed its agricultural program. He restructured the university into three colleges: business, education, and liberal arts. He also established the schools of art, music, journalism, and speech. Leebrick created the Inter-University Council for Ohio's state universities in 1939. However, in late 1942, he was notified that his contract would not be renewed. On May 27, 1943, the university's board of trustees voted not to rehire Leebrick as president, giving him a leave of absence from June 1 until the end of his contract August 1, 1943. His dismissal was related to his rapid changes and strained personal relationships. Leebrick noted that the board's reasons were "subversive, political and have nothing whatever to do with the university."

In May 1943, Leebrick then became a major in the specialists reserves of the United States Army for World War II, serving in Germany and Japan. In 1945, Leebrick became the special assistant to the political advisor of General Douglas MacArthur and was stationed at the American Embassy in Tokyo which was serving as the headquarters of the Supreme Commander of the Allied Powers. He left the military as a lieutenant colonel.

In the fall of 1946, Leebrick returned to the University of Hawaiʻi as a professor of government and veterans advisor. In 1947, he was made the university's vice president In August 1947, Leebrick was called into active duty by the U.S. Army Reserves and was sent on an thirty day mission to advise the U.S. military governor of Korea on the educational system in American occupied Korea. In 1948, Leebrick was appointed the alternate commissioner to the South Pacific Commission meeting in Australia. He was named the United States representative to the six-person planning committee. He retired from the University of Hawaiʻi at the mandatory age of 65 in July 1951.

Leebrick then became an assistant to the administrator of the Trust Territory, later becoming a liaison officer and historian with the rank of admiral of the United States Navy in the Trust Territory. He resigned for the Trust Territory on June 30, 1953 to return to academia as the first president of Moanaolu Community Junior College in Pāʻia, Hawaii. In 1957, he was appointed to the Hawaii Statehood Commission. He retired as president emeritus of the Maunaolu College in 1967.

== Honors ==
Leebrick received the alumni achievement award from Arizona State University, previously Tempe Normal School, in February 1964. In 1968, Leebrick Hall, a dormitory at Kent State University, was named in Leebrick's honor.

== Personal life ==
Leebrick married Beryl Mae Fountaine on September 25, 1913, at her home in Dixon, California. She was a graduate of the University of California and the daughter of a wealthy rancher, S. H. Fountaine, in Dixon. The couple initially lived in Berkeley, but moved to Madrid, Spain, for a year in August 1915. They returned to the United States in June 1916. The couple had three children.

In 1915 and 1916, Leebrick served as the secretary of the University of California Alumni Association. He was the district governor of the Rotary International. In 1964, he joined the national fund raising committee for Japan International Christian University in Tokyo.

Leebrick died in Kula, Hawaii on June 13, 1982, at the age of 96.
