= Burlington Public Library (Burlington, Iowa) =

Public library in Burlington, Iowa

- 40°48′47.60″N 91°06′34.92″W
- Location: 210 Court St. Burlington, Iowa, United States
- Type: Public
- Established: 1868

Access and use
- Circulation: 455,466 (2014)

Other information
- Director: Rhonda Frevert
- Website: www.burlington.lib.ia.us
- Burlington Public Library (former building)
- U.S. National Register of Historic Places
- U.S. Historic district – Contributing property
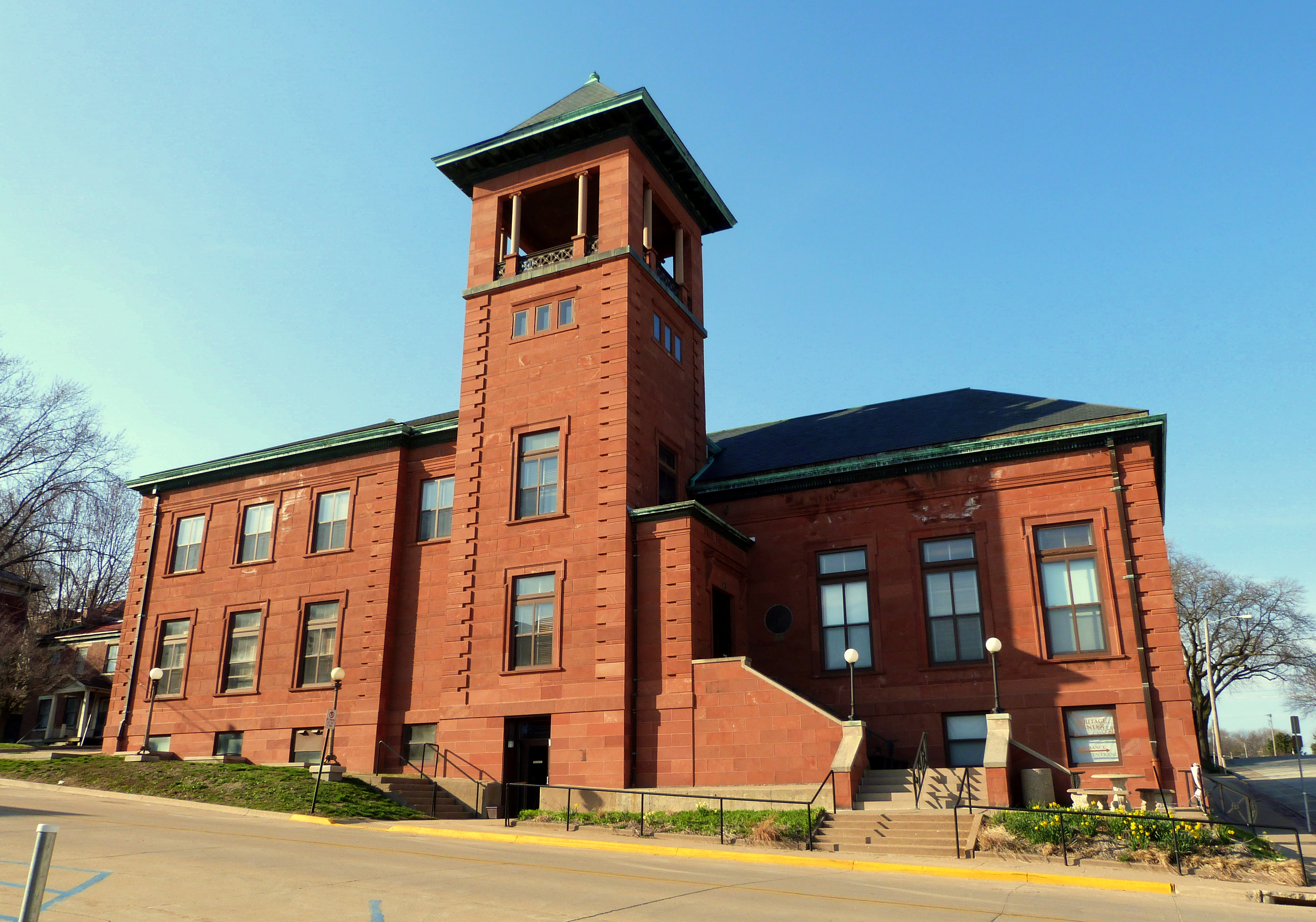
- The former Burlington Public Library building in 2013.

- Location within Iowa Location within the United States
- Location: 501 N. 4th St. Burlington, Iowa
- Coordinates: 40°48′44″N 91°06′13″W
- Area: less than one acre
- Built: 1896-1898
- Built by: J. C. Sutherland
- Architect: T.S. Hoyt
- Architectural style: Renaissance Revival
- Part of: Heritage Hill Historic District (ID82000406)
- NRHP reference No.: 75000682
- Added to NRHP: March 27, 1975

The Burlington Public Library is a public library located in Burlington, Iowa, United States. It dates back to 1868. The library is currently located on Court Street. The previous library building on Fourth Street was individually listed on the National Register of Historic Places in 1975. It was then added as a contributing property in the Heritage Hill Historic District in 1982.

== History ==
The Burlington Public Library traces its origin to a subscription library that was created in two rooms located in city hall in 1868. It was established by US Senator James Wilson Grimes who contributed $5,000 of his own money to the effort. Local philanthropist Philip M. Crapo suggested that a new library building be constructed. He offered $20,000 of his own money for the project if the city council matched his gift, which they did. Crapo also provided the funds for many of the furnishings in the building as well. Boston architect T.S. Hoyt designed the building in the Gothic Revival style. The builder, J. C. Sutherland, modified the plans and it was constructed in more of a Renaissance Revival style from 1896 to 1898. The total cost of the project was $55,000.

The ground was broken for the present library building in October 2004. Funding for the project came from the Friends of the Burlington Public Library Foundation, private contributions raised by a capital campaign, the city of Burlington, a Vision Iowa Grant, and Des Moines County. It was opened for the first time on November 13, 2006. The library won the Main Street Iowa Award for the Best Community Initiated Development Project in 2007. The library is heated and cooled by a geothermal system that is fed by 132 wells 267 feet (81 m) under the parking lot. The old library building became the home of the Des Moines County Historical Society museum.
