= Snake Alley Historic District =

Historic district in Iowa, United States

- U.S. National Register of Historic Places
- U.S. Historic district
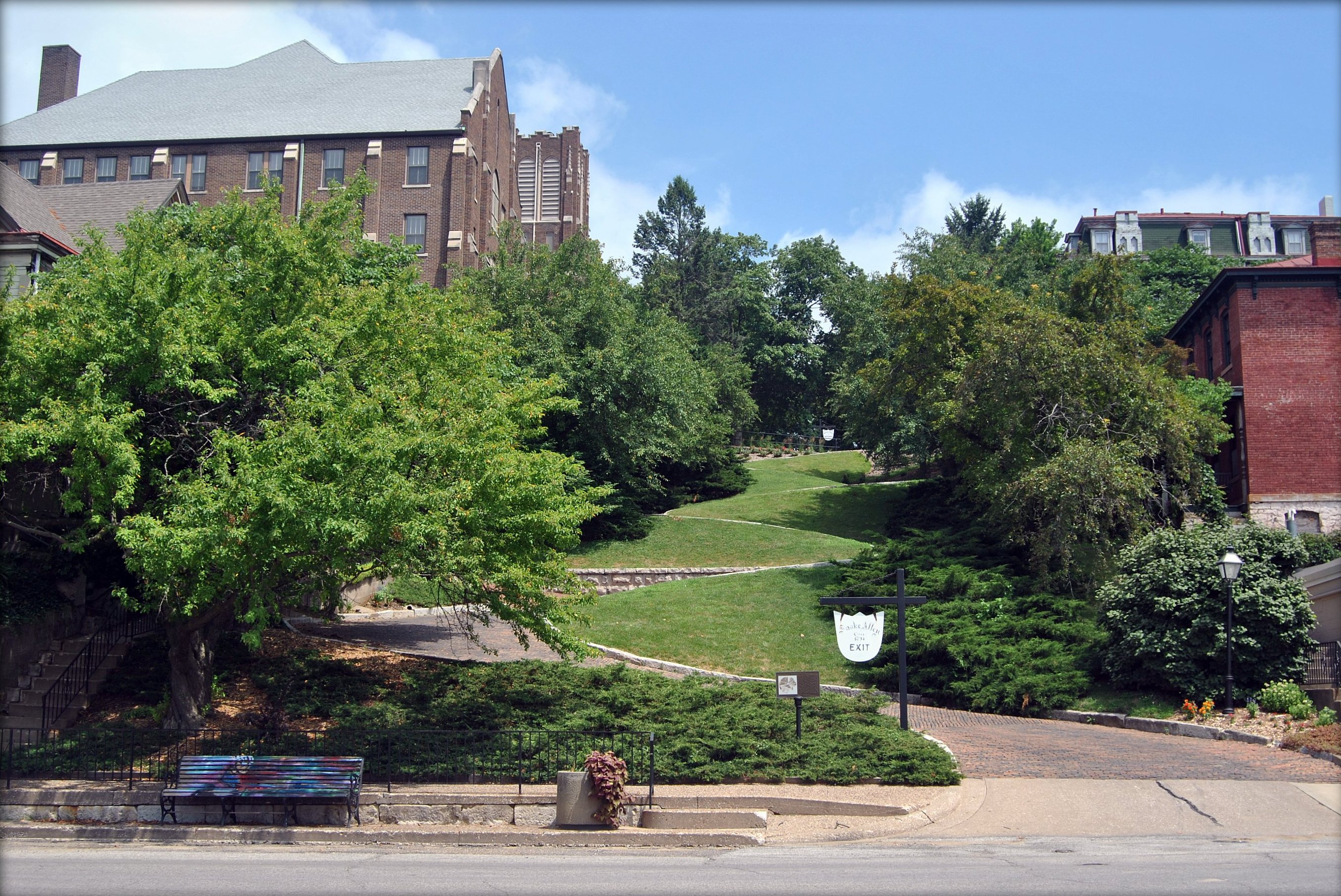
- Snake Alley from Washington Street

- Location within Iowa Location within the United States
- Location: Roughly bounded by Columbia and Washington Sts., Cobblestone Alley, and Service Dr., Burlington, Iowa
- Coordinates: 40°48′43″N 91°06′21″W
- Area: 10 acres (4.0 ha)
- Part of: Heritage Hill Historic District (ID82000406)
- NRHP reference No.: 75000683
- Added to NRHP: May 21, 1975

The Snake Alley Historic District is a nationally recognized historic district located in Burlington, Iowa, United States. It was listed on the National Register of Historic Places in 1975, and it was included in the Heritage Hill Historic District that surrounds it, in 1982. The historic district is largely a residential area that includes ten contributing properties. It is centered on Snake Alley, a 275-foot (84 m) brick roadway built in 1894 that rises 58.3 feet (18 m) from Washington Street to Columbia Street. The alley receives its name from the five half curves and two quarter curves that climb the hill. Cobblestone Alley is the eastern boundary of the district. It is a very steep roadway composed of large, limestone blocks. Six houses, built between 1845 and about 1880, surround Snake Alley. Schwartz' Auto Electric Service building and the First United Church of Christ complex round out the contributing buildings.

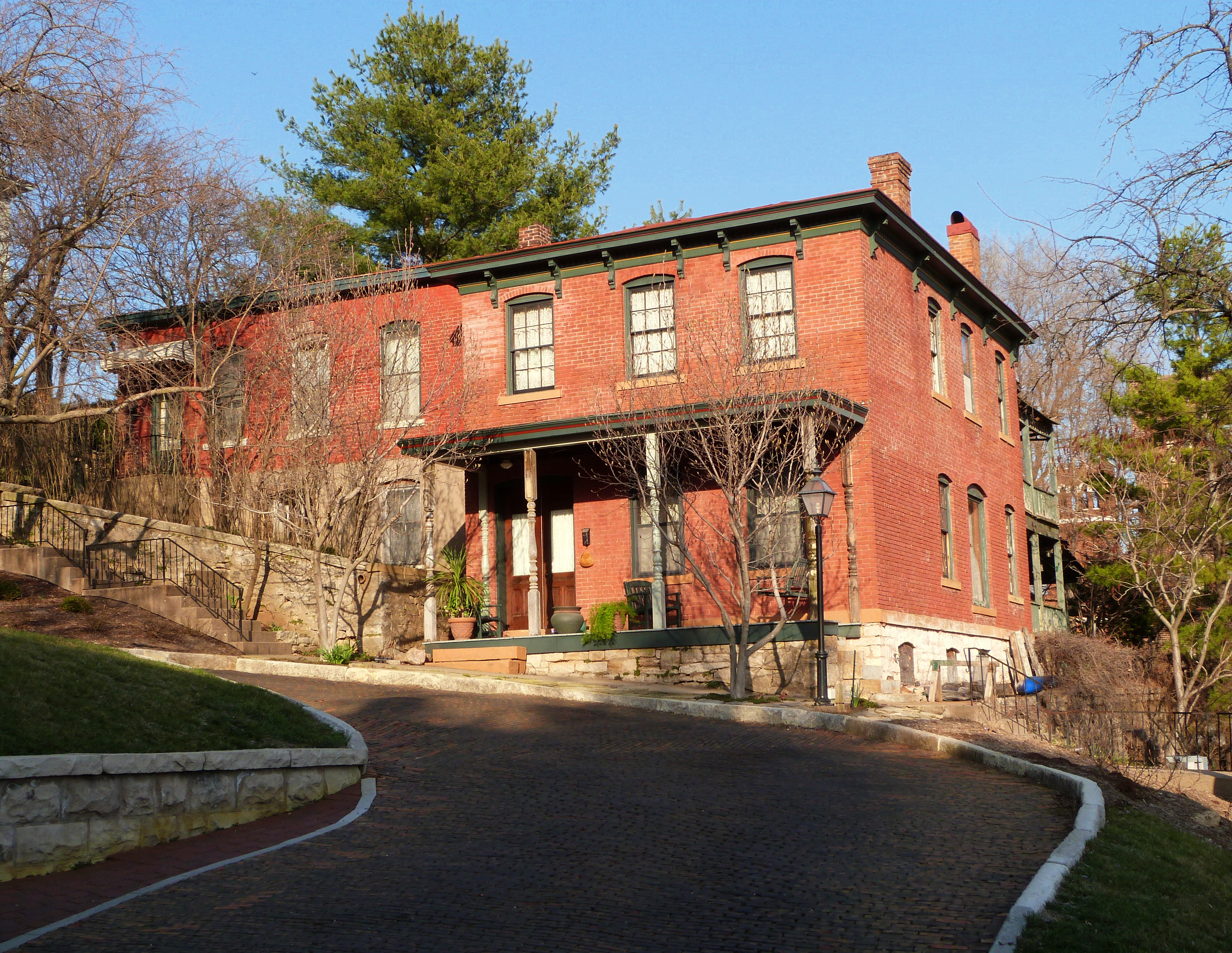
Peter Bouquet House (1871)

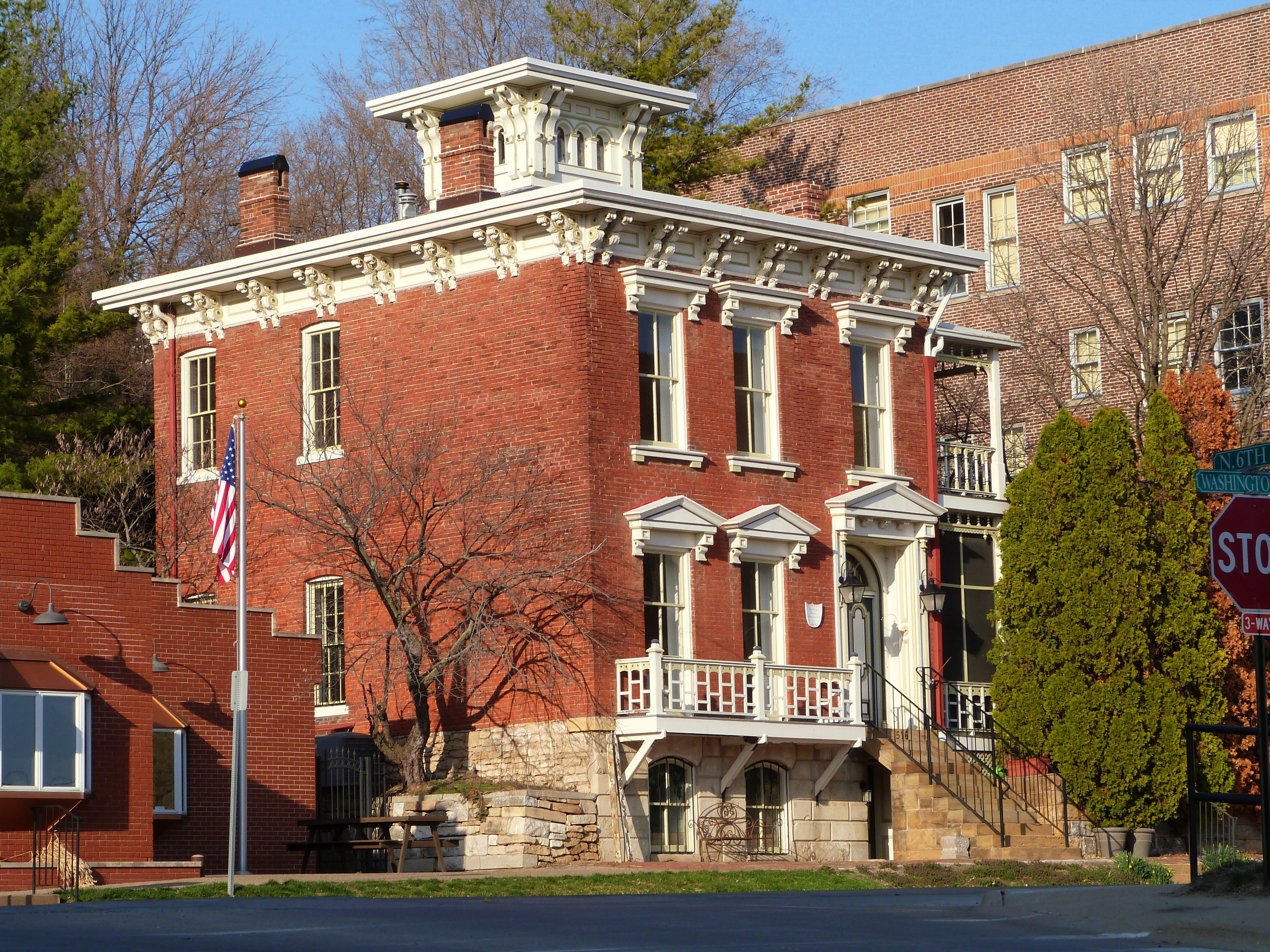
William Fordney House (1845)

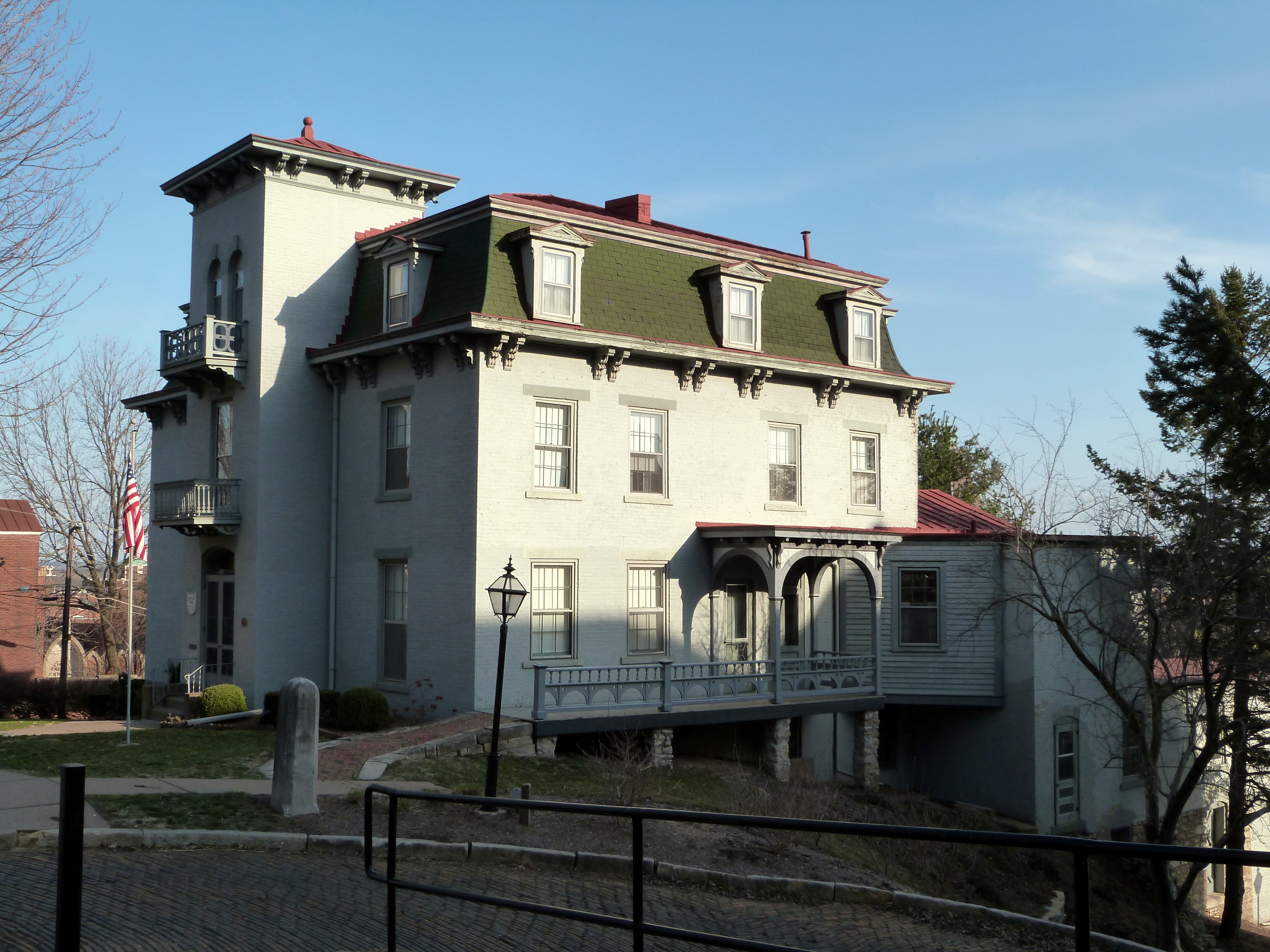
Garrett-Phelps House (1851)

== See also ==
- National Register of Historic Places listings in Des Moines County, Iowa
- Media related to Snake Alley Historic District at Wikimedia Commons
