= Snake Alley (Burlington, Iowa) =

- U.S. National Register of Historic Places
- U.S. Historic district – Contributing property
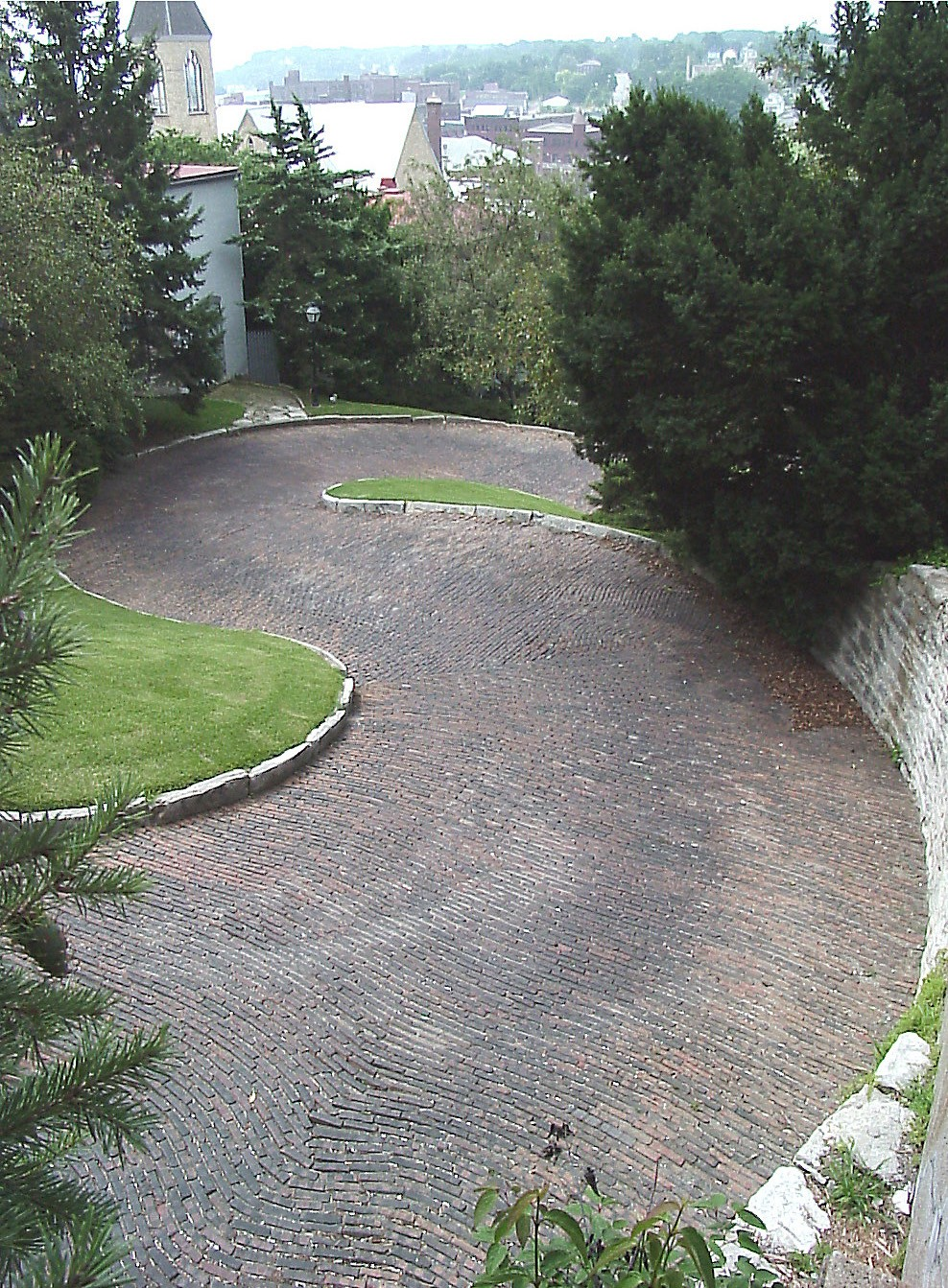
- Location: Burlington, Iowa
- Coordinates: 40°48′43″N 91°06′21″W
- Built: 1894
- Architect: William Steyh
- Part of: Snake Alley Historic District (ID75000683); Heritage Hill Historic District (ID82000406)
- NRHP reference No.: 74000783
- Added to NRHP: September 6, 1974

Snake Alley is a street located in Burlington, Iowa, which was built in 1894. In 2017, Ripley's Believe It or Not! recognized the street as "Unbelievably Crooked" and the #1 Odd Spot in their Odd Spots Across America Campaign.

== History ==
The physical limitations and steep elevation of Heritage Hill inspired the construction of Snake Alley in 1894. It was intended to link the downtown business district and the neighborhood shopping area located on North Sixth Street, of which Snake Alley is a one-block section. Three German immigrants conceived and carried out the idea of a winding hillside street, similar to vineyard paths in France and Germany: Charles Starker, an architect and landscape engineer; William Steyh, the city engineer; and George Kriechbaum, a paving contractor. The street was completed in 1898, but was not originally named Snake Alley, as it was considered part of North Sixth Street; some years later, a resident noted that it reminded him of a snake winding its way down the hill, and the name stuck.

The alley originally provided a shortcut from Heritage Hill to the business district. Bricks were laid at an angle to allow horses better footing as they descended. Unfortunately, riding horses back up the alley often resulted in a loss of control at the top; for this reason, even to this day, Snake Alley remains a one-way street, with all traffic heading downhill.

In the 1940s, writer Robert L. Ripley saw the street in person, and decided to add it to his Ripley's Believe It or Not! column, calling it "The Crookedest Street in the World". The turns on Snake Alley are sharper than San Francisco’s famous Lombard Street, giving it a total of 1100° of turning from end to end, where Lombard Street's straighter curves total only 1000°.

The alley is composed of limestone and blueclay bricks. The constantly changing slant from one curve to the next necessitated a complicated construction technique to keep the high grade to the outside. Snake Alley consists of five half-curves and two quarter-curves over a distance of 275 feet (83.8 m), rising 58.3 ft (17.8 m), a 21% grade, from Washington Street to Columbia.

The street is the site of an annual uphill bike race, the Snake Alley Criterium.

== See also ==
- Lombard Street, a street in San Francisco with a similarly crooked path.
- Vermont Street, also in San Francisco.
