= Burlington, Iowa =

- City
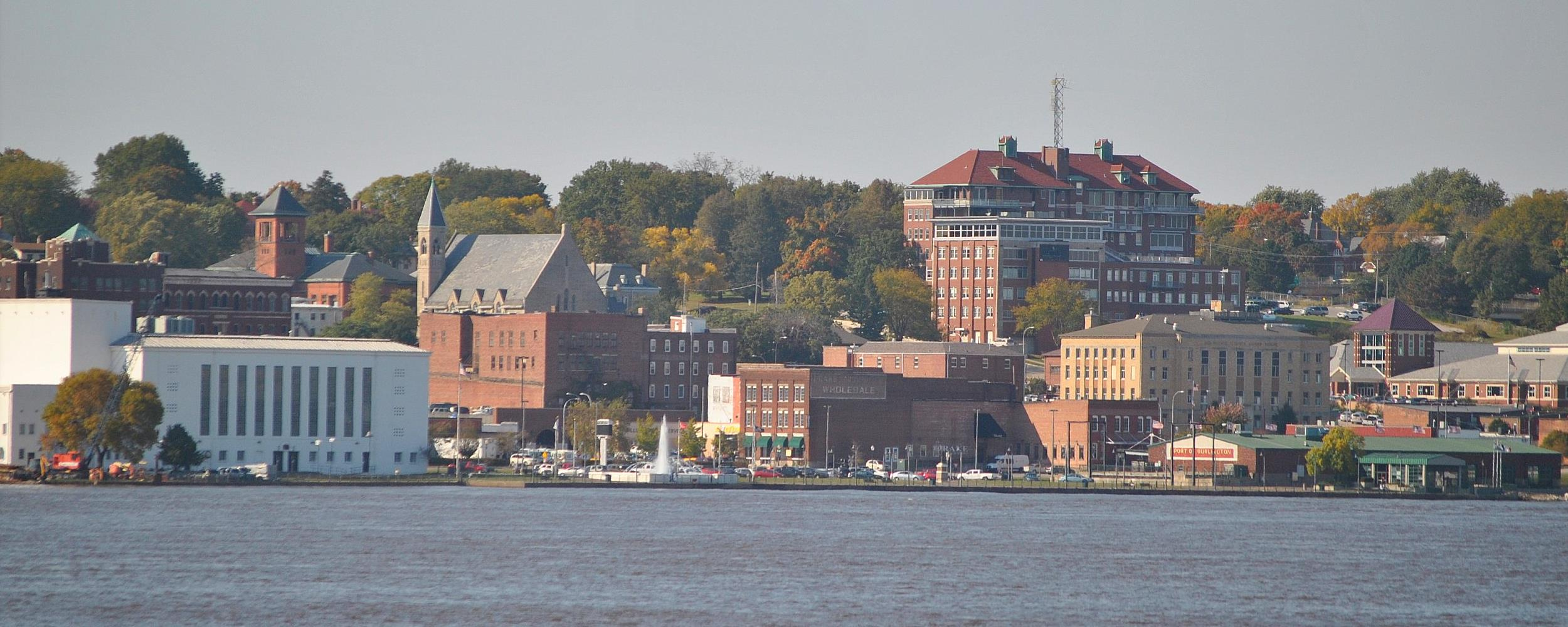
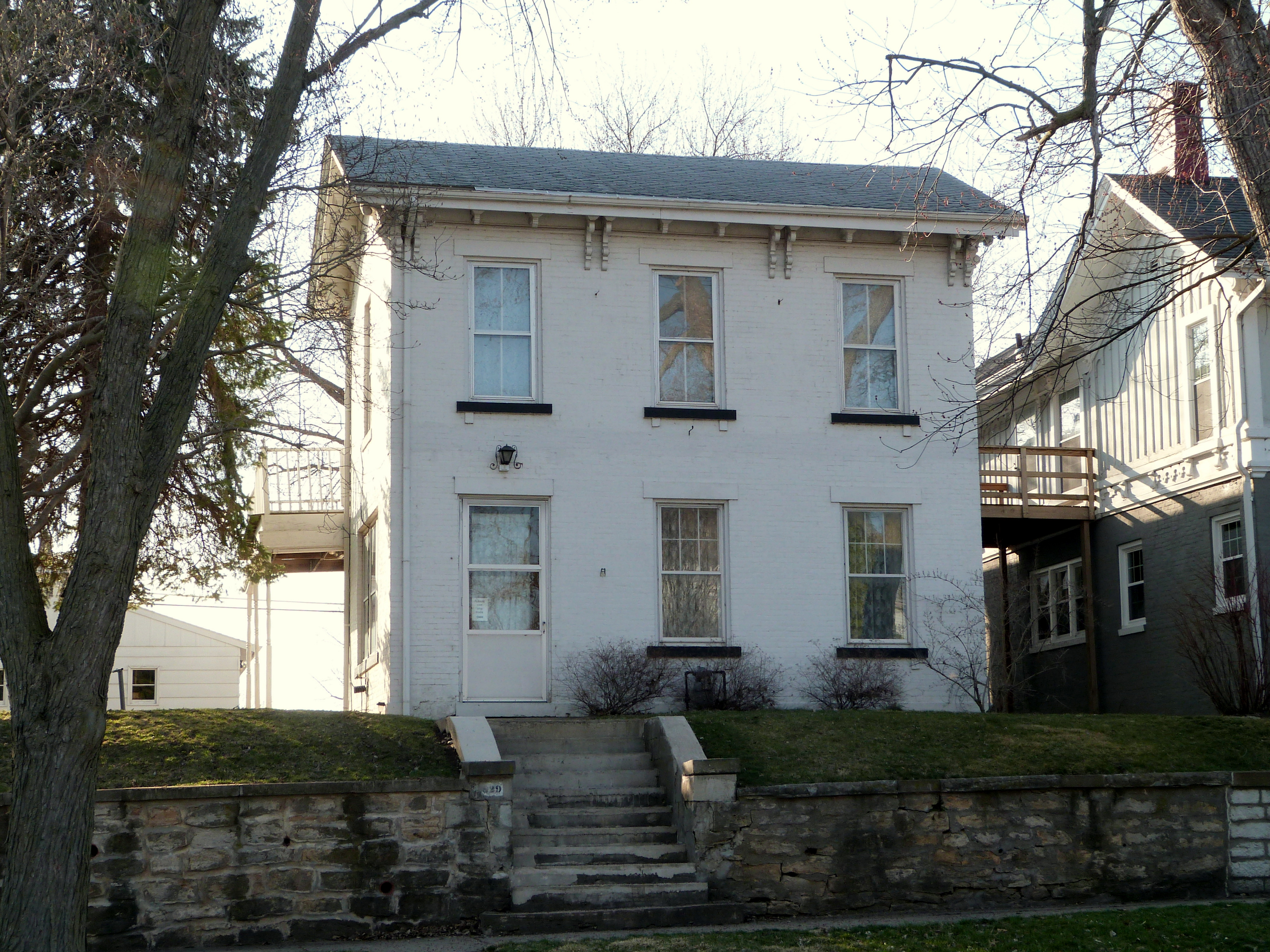
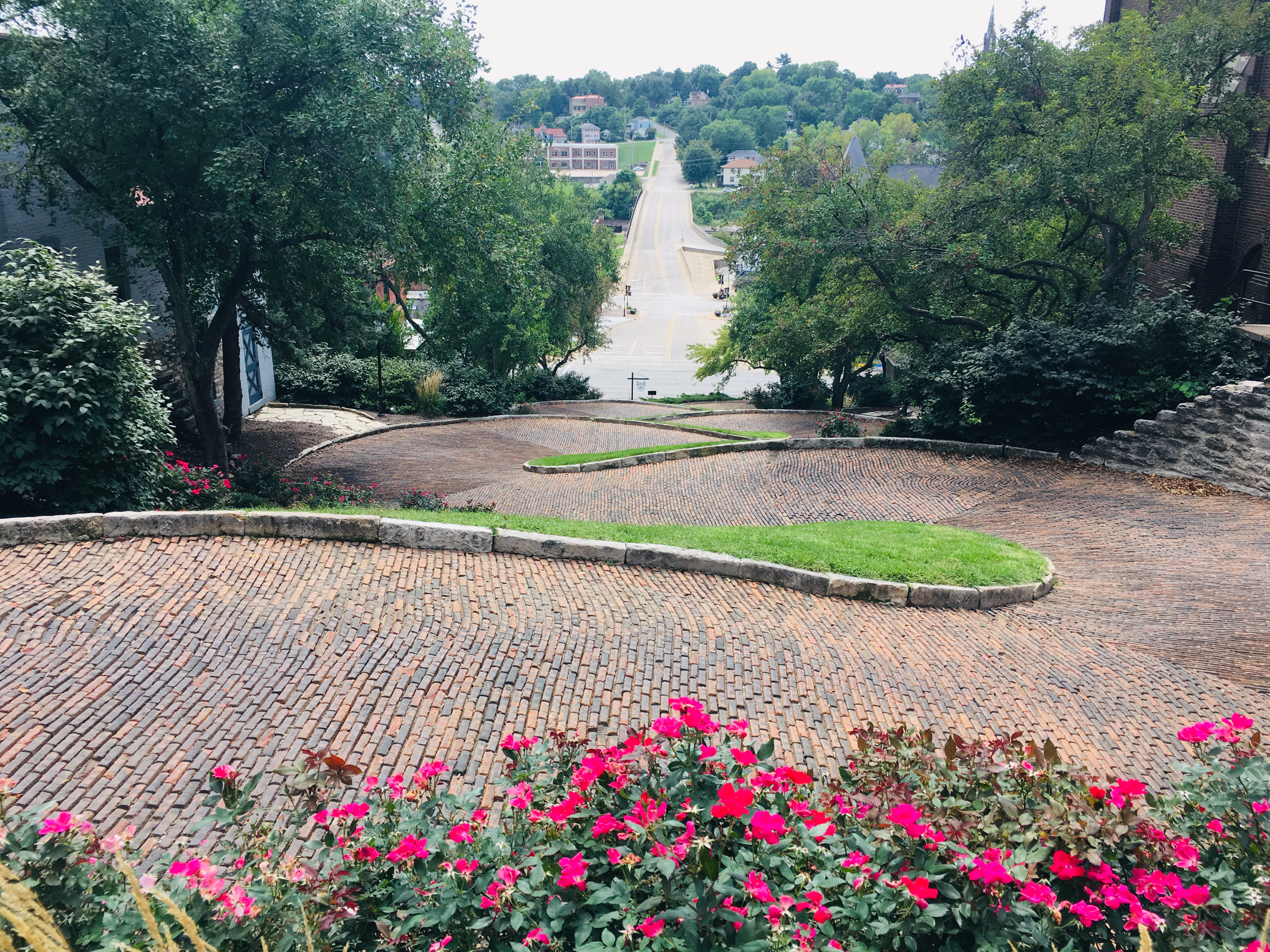
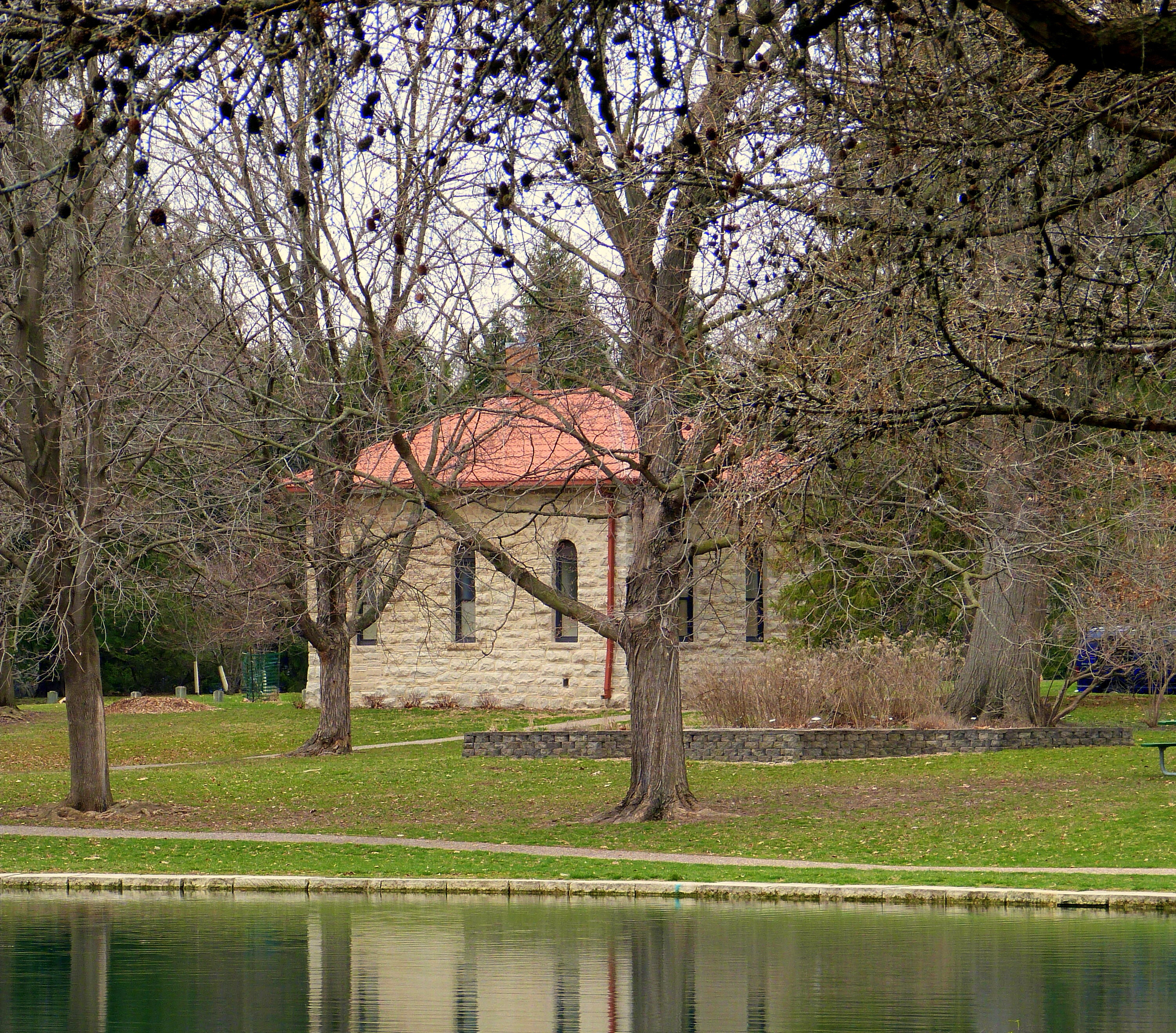
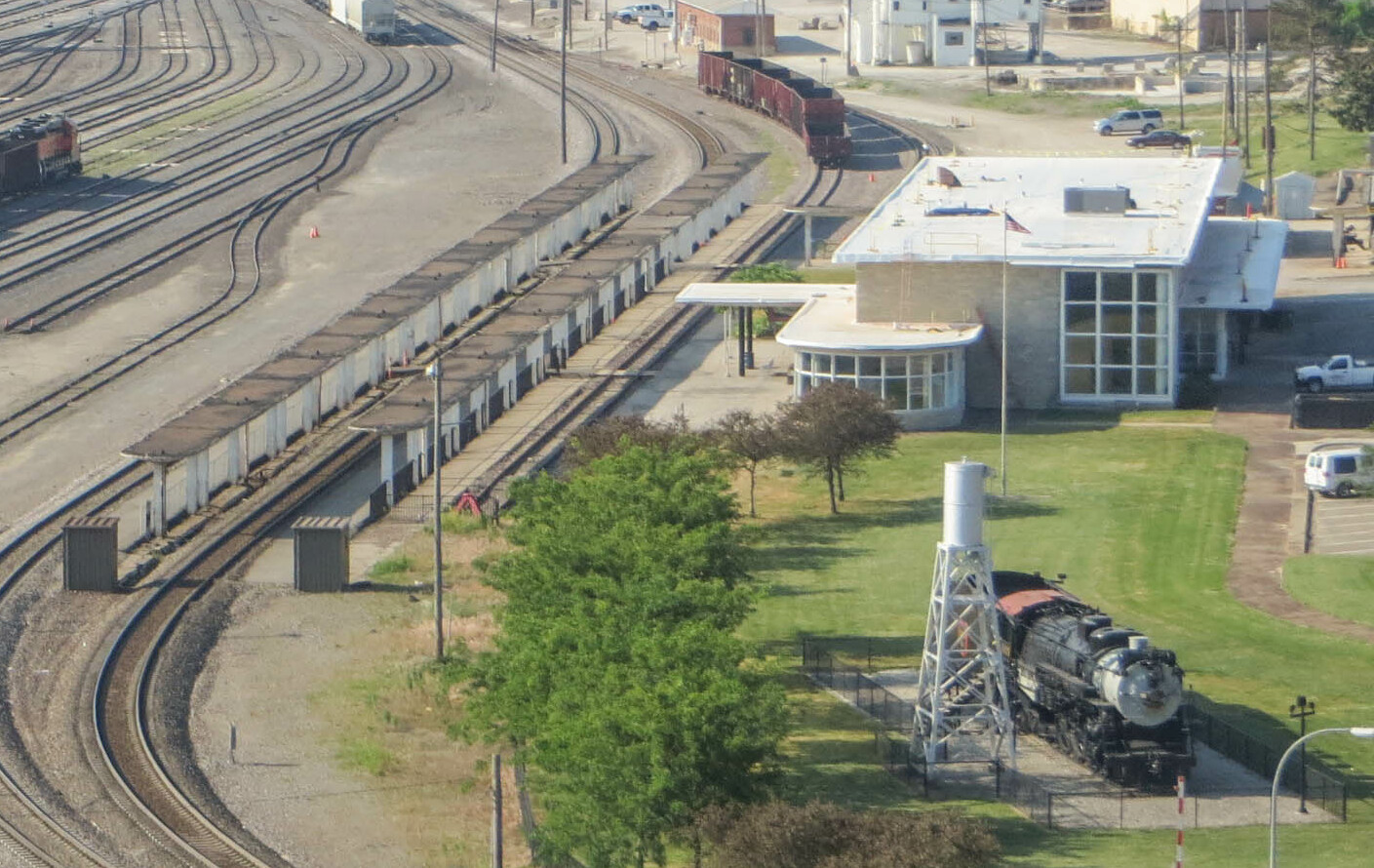
- Mississippi River and Downtown Burlington A. C. Dodge House Snake Alley Crapo Park Burlington Amtrak Station
- Interactive map of Burlington, Iowa
- Location within Iowa Location within the United States
- Coordinates: 40°48′38″N 91°6′5″W
- Country: United States
- State: Iowa
- County: Des Moines
- Founded: 1833
- Named for: Burlington, Vermont

Government
  - Type: Mayor–council government

Area
  - Total: 15.17 sq mi (39.29 km^{2})
  - Land: 14.41 sq mi (37.32 km^{2})
  - Water: 0.76 sq mi (1.98 km^{2})
- Elevation: 627 ft (191 m)

Population (2020)
  - Total: 23,982
  - Density: 1,664.5/sq mi (642.68/km^{2})
  - Demonym: Burlingtonian
- Time zone: UTC−6 (CST)
  - Summer (DST): UTC−5 (CDT)
- ZIP code: 52601
- Area code: 319
- FIPS code: 19-09550
- GNIS feature ID: 2393469
- Website: burlingtoniowa.org

Burlington is a city in and the county seat of Des Moines County, Iowa, United States. The population was 23,982 in the 2020 census, a decline from the 26,839 population in 2000. Burlington is the center of a micropolitan area, which includes West Burlington and Middletown, Iowa, and Gulfport, Illinois. Burlington is the home of Snake Alley, the crookedest street on earth.

== History ==
Prior to European settlement, the area was neutral territory for the Sauk and Meskwaki peoples, who called it Shoquoquon (Shok-ko-kon), meaning Flint Hills.

In 1803, President Thomas Jefferson organized two parties of explorers to map the Louisiana Purchase. The Lewis and Clark Expedition followed the Missouri River, while Lt. Zebulon Pike followed the Mississippi River. In 1805, Pike landed at the bluffs below Burlington and raised the United States Flag for the first time on what would become Iowa soil and recommended construction of a fort. The recommendation went unheeded.

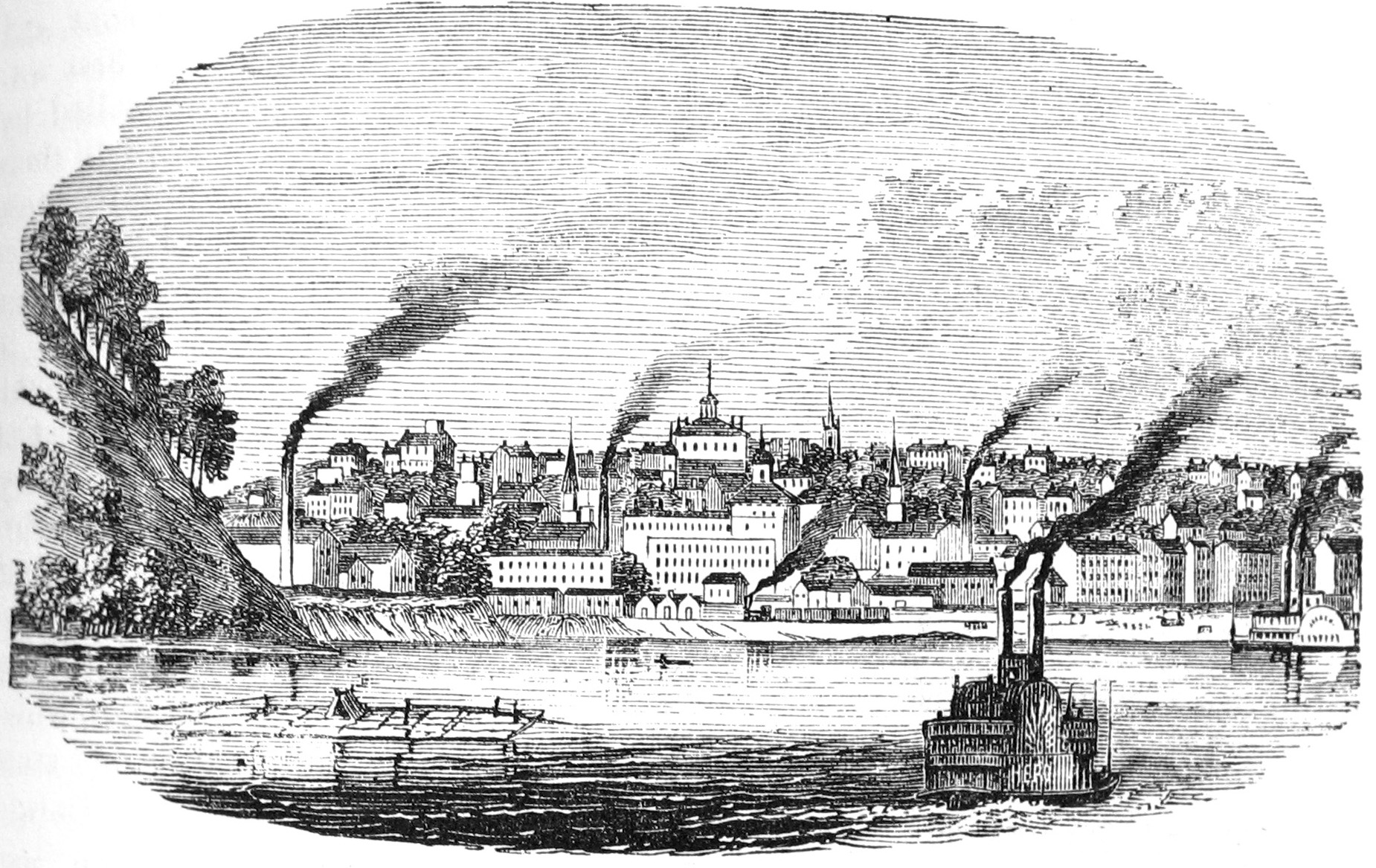
Burlington in 1865.

The American Fur Company of John Jacob Astor established a post in the area in 1829. Settlement began in 1833, shortly after the Black Hawk Purchase, when Samuel (aka Simpson) White, Amzi Doolitle, and Morton M. McCarver crossed the Mississippi River from Big Island and staked claims there. According to an account A.T. Andreas wrote in 1875, White erected a cabin in the area, later platted to be Front Street between Court and High streets. Andreas called White and Doolittle the Romulus and Remus of their settlement, referring to the mythic heroes who founded Rome, a city surrounded by hills. A few weeks later, William R. Ross joined them and established a general store. In November and December, he surveyed the settlement for White and Doolittle.

In the spring of 1834 they allowed John Gray, who purchased the first lot with his wife Eliza Jane, to rename the town for $50. Gray chose to name it Burlington in honor of his hometown in Vermont. The Grays' daughter Abigail was born in Burlington that same year, the first European-descended American settler child born on Iowa soil. (Note: John Gray was of European descent. Eliza Jane Gray was of mixed African American and Native American heritage.)

In 1837, Burlington was designated the second territorial capital of the Wisconsin Territory. The Iowa Territory was organized in the following year, and Burlington was named as its first territorial capital. The government used "Old Zion", the first Methodist Church in Iowa (located near what is now Third and Washington streets), to conduct its business. A historical marker commemorates the site of the church and early territorial government.

On May 22, 1849, Maj. William Williams visited Burlington, writing a brief description in his journal:

This town [was] originally called Flint Hill- the Indian name was Shoquokon, Flint or Rock Hill. [It is] beautifully elevated, situated on the west side of the Mississippi River, a place of very considerable business. The town is very well built. Houses are good, generally taste[ful], brick dwellings. A great many handsome residences on the more elevated parts of the bluff. The number of inhabitants between 3,000 and 3,500. ... Was the first seat of government after the formation of the Territory of Iowa. The view of the city is extremely picturesque from the river. The main part of the city is situated like an amphitheater formed by the surrounding hills, beautiful buildings and private residences on the eminences around. From the location of Burlington it must always be a place of considerable trade. The city is well built [in the] modern style, a very intelligent population... The river here is over 3/4 of mile wide and steam ferry boats constantly plying between this and the Illinois shore.

— Maj. William Williams

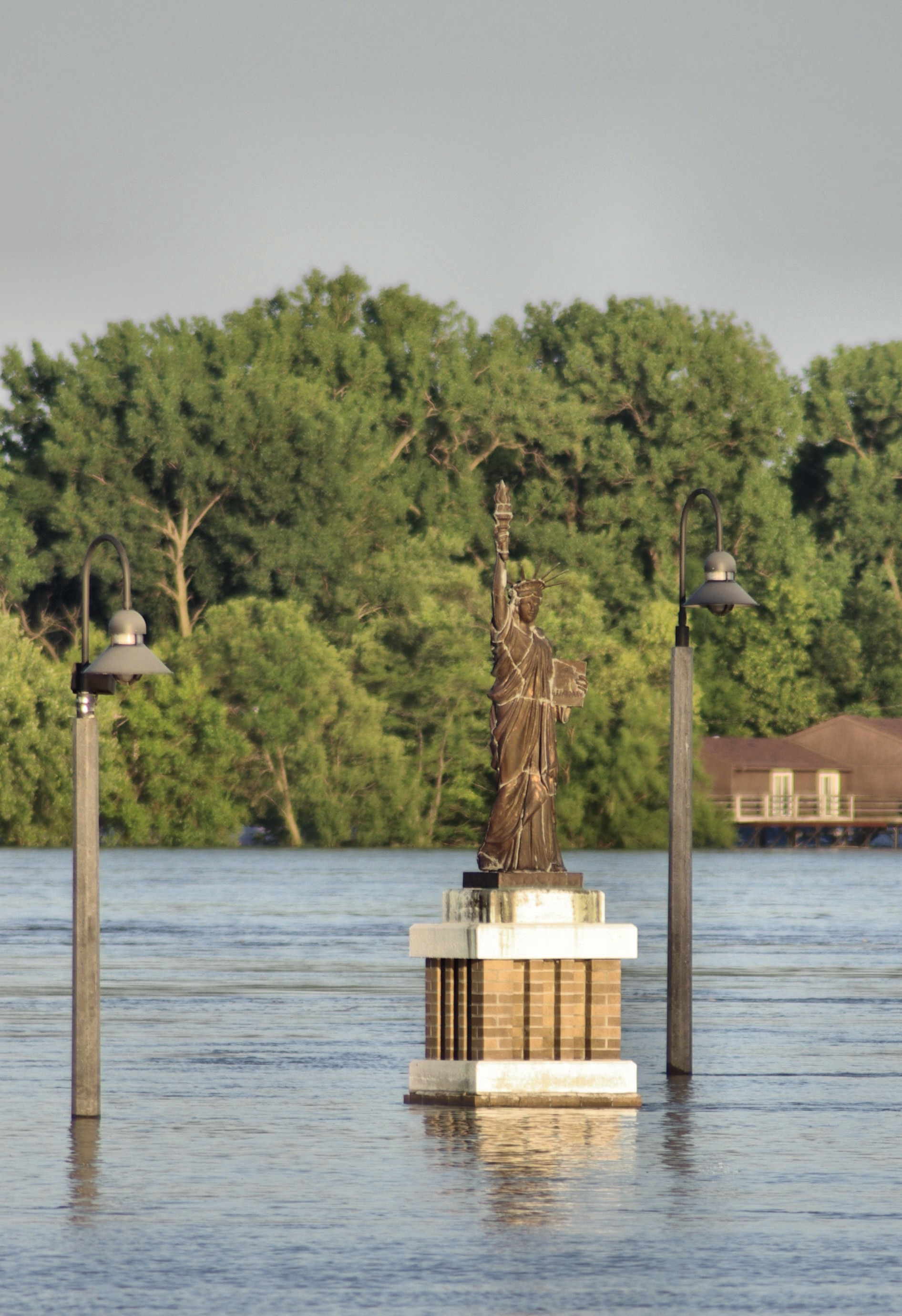
Lady Liberty of Burlington

In April 1885, economist Henry George gave a speech titled "The Crime of Poverty" at the Burlington Knights of Labor local advocating for a citizen's dividend paid for by a land value tax.

Iowa's nickname, "The Hawkeye State", has its roots in Burlington. At Judge David Rorer's suggestion, publisher James G. Edwards changed The Iowa Patriot newspaper's name to The Hawk-Eye and Iowa Patriot in tribute to his friend, Chief Black Hawk. Rorer is said to have found the name in James Fenimore Cooper's The Last of the Mohicans, but Edwards proposed the nickname to "...rescue from oblivion [sic] a momento [sic], at least of the name of the old chief."

Burlington was a bustling river port in the steamboat era and a central city to the Chicago, Burlington and Quincy Railroad. The "Burlington Route" (1848–1970) merged into the Burlington Northern Railroad (1970–1996), which in turn merged into the BNSF Railway (1997–present). The "Burlington" name has been given to one of the United States' largest railroads. One of BNSF's main east-west lines, the Ottumwa subdivision, still crosses the Mississippi at Burlington.

In 1970, the community had its highest ever population.

In the late twentieth century, retail expanded with suburbanization of the population. After purchasing Benner Tea, Aldi opened its first store in the United States at Burlington in 1976. Westland Mall opened in nearby West Burlington in 1977.

== Geography ==
According to the United States Census Bureau, the city has a total area of 15.24 square miles (39.47 km^{2}), of which 14.48 square miles (37.50 km^{2}) is land and 0.76 square miles (1.97 km^{2}) is water.

=== Climate ===
Climate data for Burlington, Iowa (Southeast Iowa Regional Airport) 1991–2020 normals, extremes 1897–present
Month	Jan	Feb	Mar	Apr	May	Jun	Jul	Aug	Sep	Oct	Nov	Dec	Year
Record high °F (°C)	70 (21)	77 (25)	88 (31)	93 (34)	103 (39)	105 (41)	111 (44)	110 (43)	103 (39)	95 (35)	86 (30)	73 (23)	111 (44)
Mean maximum °F (°C)	55.3 (12.9)	59.9 (15.5)	74.2 (23.4)	82.6 (28.1)	88.7 (31.5)	93.1 (33.9)	94.7 (34.8)	94.6 (34.8)	91.4 (33.0)	84.3 (29.1)	70.6 (21.4)	59.3 (15.2)	96.8 (36.0)
Mean daily maximum °F (°C)	32.3 (0.2)	37.2 (2.9)	50.2 (10.1)	62.8 (17.1)	73.1 (22.8)	82.3 (27.9)	85.2 (29.6)	83.5 (28.6)	77.5 (25.3)	64.5 (18.1)	49.8 (9.9)	37.4 (3.0)	61.3 (16.3)
Daily mean °F (°C)	24.3 (−4.3)	28.8 (−1.8)	40.7 (4.8)	52.3 (11.3)	63.0 (17.2)	72.5 (22.5)	75.6 (24.2)	73.8 (23.2)	66.7 (19.3)	54.2 (12.3)	41.0 (5.0)	29.9 (−1.2)	51.9 (11.0)
Mean daily minimum °F (°C)	16.4 (−8.7)	20.5 (−6.4)	31.1 (−0.5)	41.9 (5.5)	52.9 (11.6)	62.6 (17.0)	66.0 (18.9)	64.0 (17.8)	55.8 (13.2)	44.0 (6.7)	32.3 (0.2)	22.3 (−5.4)	42.5 (5.8)
Mean minimum °F (°C)	−6.6 (−21.4)	0.4 (−17.6)	10.8 (−11.8)	26.8 (−2.9)	38.0 (3.3)	50.4 (10.2)	55.5 (13.1)	53.6 (12.0)	40.0 (4.4)	27.6 (−2.4)	15.1 (−9.4)	0.9 (−17.3)	−10.9 (−23.8)
Record low °F (°C)	−24 (−31)	−27 (−33)	−13 (−25)	11 (−12)	26 (−3)	39 (4)	46 (8)	41 (5)	23 (−5)	10 (−12)	−2 (−19)	−22 (−30)	−27 (−33)
Average precipitation inches (mm)	1.45 (37)	1.69 (43)	2.43 (62)	3.92 (100)	4.93 (125)	4.87 (124)	4.02 (102)	3.77 (96)	3.53 (90)	3.09 (78)	2.29 (58)	1.87 (47)	37.86 (962)
Average snowfall inches (cm)	6.7 (17)	6.5 (17)	1.9 (4.8)	0.1 (0.25)	0.0 (0.0)	0.0 (0.0)	0.0 (0.0)	0.0 (0.0)	0.0 (0.0)	0.0 (0.0)	0.8 (2.0)	7.5 (19)	23.5 (60.05)
Average precipitation days (≥ 0.01 in)	8.0	8.2	9.9	11.8	13.2	11.4	9.8	9.1	7.5	9.3	8.0	7.5	113.7
Average snowy days (≥ 0.1 in)	4.7	5.1	1.8	0.1	0.0	0.0	0.0	0.0	0.0	0.0	1.3	4.5	17.5
Source: NOAA

Climate data for Burlington 2S, Iowa (1991–2020 normals, extremes 1964–present)
Month	Jan	Feb	Mar	Apr	May	Jun	Jul	Aug	Sep	Oct	Nov	Dec	Year
Record high °F (°C)	70 (21)	76 (24)	88 (31)	92 (33)	98 (37)	104 (40)	105 (41)	105 (41)	101 (38)	93 (34)	79 (26)	74 (23)	105 (41)
Mean maximum °F (°C)	56.0 (13.3)	60.4 (15.8)	73.0 (22.8)	81.1 (27.3)	88.0 (31.1)	92.6 (33.7)	95.1 (35.1)	94.5 (34.7)	91.4 (33.0)	83.9 (28.8)	69.4 (20.8)	58.7 (14.8)	97.0 (36.1)
Mean daily maximum °F (°C)	32.0 (0.0)	37.1 (2.8)	49.9 (9.9)	62.3 (16.8)	72.7 (22.6)	81.8 (27.7)	85.0 (29.4)	83.4 (28.6)	77.1 (25.1)	64.5 (18.1)	49.6 (9.8)	36.9 (2.7)	61.0 (16.1)
Daily mean °F (°C)	23.5 (−4.7)	28.1 (−2.2)	39.7 (4.3)	51.4 (10.8)	62.3 (16.8)	71.7 (22.1)	75.3 (24.1)	73.4 (23.0)	66.2 (19.0)	53.9 (12.2)	40.3 (4.6)	28.8 (−1.8)	51.2 (10.7)
Mean daily minimum °F (°C)	15.0 (−9.4)	19.1 (−7.2)	29.6 (−1.3)	40.5 (4.7)	51.9 (11.1)	61.7 (16.5)	65.6 (18.7)	63.5 (17.5)	55.2 (12.9)	43.3 (6.3)	31.0 (−0.6)	20.7 (−6.3)	41.4 (5.2)
Mean minimum °F (°C)	−6.0 (−21.1)	−0.1 (−17.8)	9.6 (−12.4)	26.3 (−3.2)	38.9 (3.8)	50.3 (10.2)	56.8 (13.8)	55.0 (12.8)	40.8 (4.9)	28.9 (−1.7)	14.9 (−9.5)	1.5 (−16.9)	−9.4 (−23.0)
Record low °F (°C)	−23 (−31)	−26 (−32)	−9 (−23)	11 (−12)	28 (−2)	40 (4)	46 (8)	42 (6)	30 (−1)	18 (−8)	−2 (−19)	−20 (−29)	−26 (−32)
Average precipitation inches (mm)	1.72 (44)	1.90 (48)	2.80 (71)	4.24 (108)	5.16 (131)	5.14 (131)	4.34 (110)	3.87 (98)	3.89 (99)	3.25 (83)	2.57 (65)	2.14 (54)	41.02 (1,042)
Average snowfall inches (cm)	6.3 (16)	5.8 (15)	2.1 (5.3)	0.9 (2.3)	0.0 (0.0)	0.0 (0.0)	0.0 (0.0)	0.0 (0.0)	0.0 (0.0)	0.1 (0.25)	1.3 (3.3)	5.3 (13)	21.8 (55.15)
Average precipitation days (≥ 0.01 in)	9.0	8.6	9.5	11.4	12.6	11.3	9.6	8.9	7.3	9.1	8.5	7.9	113.7
Average snowy days (≥ 0.1 in)	4.3	3.6	1.4	0.3	0.0	0.0	0.0	0.0	0.0	0.0	0.8	3.1	13.5
Source: NOAA

== Demographics ==
Historical population
Census	Pop.	Note	%±
1850	4,082		—
1860	6,706		64.3%
1870	14,930		122.6%
1880	19,450		30.3%
1890	22,565		16.0%
1900	23,201		2.8%
1910	24,324		4.8%
1920	24,057		−1.1%
1930	26,755		11.2%
1940	25,832		−3.4%
1950	30,613		18.5%
1960	32,430		5.9%
1970	32,366		−0.2%
1980	29,529		−8.8%
1990	27,208		−7.9%
2000	26,839		−1.4%
2010	25,663		−4.4%
2020	23,982		−6.6%
U.S. Decennial Census

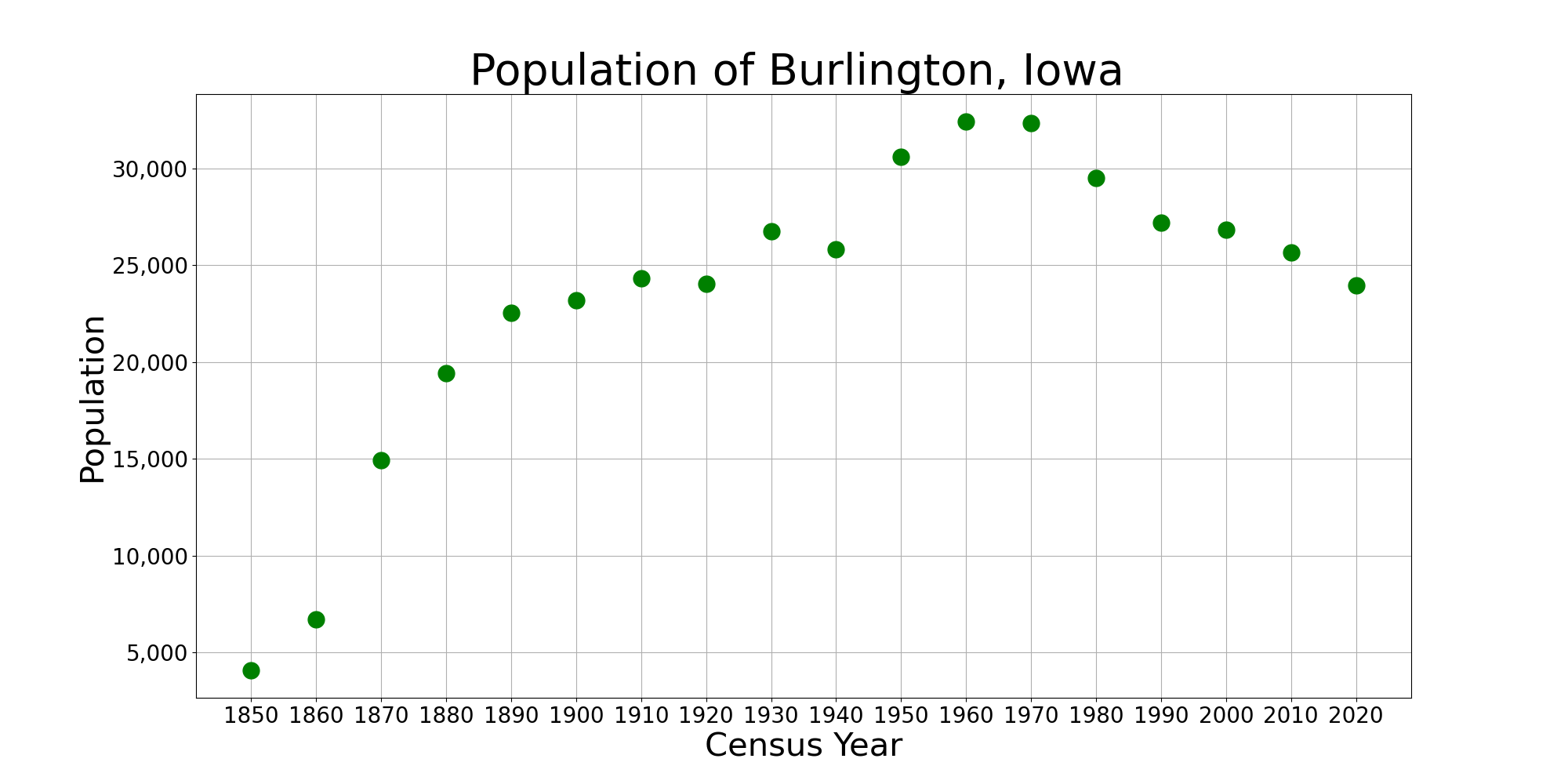
The population of Burlington, Iowa from US census data

=== 2020 census ===
As of the 2020 census, Burlington had a population of 23,982, with 10,629 households and 6,145 families. The population density was 1,663.8 inhabitants per square mile (642.4/km^{2}). There were 12,016 housing units at an average density of 833.7 per square mile (321.9/km^{2}).

The homeowner vacancy rate was 4.1% and the rental vacancy rate was 10.5%; 11.5% of all housing units were vacant.

99.9% of residents lived in urban areas, while 0.1% lived in rural areas.

Of the 10,629 households, 25.6% had children under the age of 18 living in them; 37.5% were married-couple households, 8.7% were cohabitating couples, 32.6% had a female householder with no spouse or partner present, and 21.3% had a male householder with no spouse or partner present. 42.2% of all households were non-families. About 35.5% of all households were made up of individuals, and 16.2% had someone living alone who was 65 years of age or older.

The median age was 41.6 years; 24.2% of residents were under age 20, 5.5% were between the ages of 20 and 24, 24.0% were from 25 to 44, 25.4% were from 45 to 64, and 20.9% were 65 years of age or older. There were 93.6 males for every 100 females and 91.8 males for every 100 females age 18 and over; the gender makeup was 48.4% male and 51.6% female.

Racial composition as of the 2020 census
Race	Number	Percent
White	19,455	81.1%
Black or African American	2,284	9.5%
American Indian and Alaska Native	68	0.3%
Asian	226	0.9%
Native Hawaiian and Other Pacific Islander	10	0.0%
Some other race	337	1.4%
Two or more races	1,602	6.7%
Hispanic or Latino (of any race)	910	3.8%

=== 2010 census ===
As of the 2010 census, there were 25,663 people, 10,938 households, and 6,693 families residing in the city. The population density was 1,772.3 inhabitants per square mile (684.3/km^{2}). There were 11,899 housing units at an average density of 821.8 per square mile (317.3/km^{2}). The racial makeup of the city was 81.2% White, 14.2% African American, 0.3% Native American, 0.8% Asian, 0.1% Pacific Islander, 0.7% from other races, and 2.9% from two or more races. Hispanic or Latino of any race were 3.1% of the population.

There were 10,938 households, of which 29.8% had children under the age of 18 living with them, 41.9% were married couples living together, 14.2% had a female householder with no husband present, 5.1% had a male householder with no wife present, and 38.8% were non-families. 32.5% of all households were made up of individuals, and 14.1% had someone living alone who was 65 years of age or older. The average household size was 2.30 and the average family size was 2.89.

The median age in the city was 39.7 years. 23.7% of residents were under the age of 18; 7.7% were between the ages of 18 and 24; 24.6% were from 25 to 44; 26.5% were from 45 to 64; and 17.4% were 65 years of age or older. The gender makeup of the city was 48.1% male and 51.9% female.

=== 2000 census ===
As of the 2000 census, there were 26,839 people, 11,102 households, and 7,105 families residing in the city. The population density was 1,910.1 inhabitants per square mile (737.5/km^{2}). There were 11,985 housing units at an average density of 853.0 per square mile (329.3/km^{2}). The racial makeup of the city was 86.6% White, 10.0% African American, 0.33% Native American, 0.66% Asian, 0.04% Pacific Islander, 0.90% from other races, and 1.43% from two or more races. Hispanic or Latino of any race were 2.06% of the population.

There were 11,102 households, out of which 29.2% had children under the age of 18 living with them, 48.2% were married couples living together, 12.0% had a female householder with no husband present, and 36.0% were non-families. 31.0% of all households were made up of individuals, and 14.0% had someone living alone who was 65 years of age or older. The average household size was 2.36 and the average family size was 4.94.

Age spread: 24.5% under the age of 18, 8.9% from 18 to 24, 26.7% from 25 to 44, 22.7% from 45 to 64, and 17.2% who were 65 years of age or older. The median age was 38 years. For every 100 females, there were 90.9 males. For every 100 females age 18 and over, there were 87.2 males.

The median income for a household in the city was $33,770, and the median income for a family was $40,912. Males had a median income of $33,238 versus $23,003 for females. The per capita income for the city was $19,450. About 10.0% of families and 12.6% of the population was below the poverty line, including 20.9% of those under age 18 and 8.9% of those age 65 or over.

== Economy ==
Burlington's roots are in transportation and manufacturing. Manufacturing plants are among the largest employers in the area, including companies such as American Ordnance LLC, Case Corporation, ABB (formerly General Electric), Champion Spark Plugs, Shearer's Foods and Winegard Company. The largest employer in the area is the Great River Medical Center. Among the oldest businesses in Burlington, the Murray factory (now Murray Turbomachinery and owned by Dresser-Rand) which has been in operation in Burlington since before 1900, the original building on Central St. and Washington St. which was divided by the local train tracks, was recently razed. Another long-lived business is Case Corporation, which has been at its current location on Des Moines Avenue, approximately a quarter-mile from the Mississippi River, since 1937. The first backhoes rolled off the assembly line at the Burlington plant in 1957, which is now the only plant in the United States that produces the Case Loader/Backhoe, giving Burlington the nickname "Backhoe Capital of the World". Case is now a division of the Italian holding group CNH Industrial. Employment at Case peaked in the 1980s, according to the Des Moines Register, then declined after "Case initiated a wave of buyouts and early retirements in the 1990s and early 2000s, and ended the contract with the union in 2004"; but in May 2010, the Register reports, Case announced that "it will open a new line that builds corn-picker heads for combines, as early as [Spring, 2012]" and that by mid-2013 it will add more than 200 positions.

Over the last several years, several businesses have either left the area or relocated elsewhere. These businesses include Exide, makers of vehicle batteries, CAT, Case Corporation's closest competitor in American made construction equipment, and Lehigh-Leopold, makers of office furniture. This has left some former manufacturing plants around the city empty, but other businesses have moved into them; PPG, maker of auto safety glass has moved into the former CAT plant, and a warehouse has moved into the former Leopold building. In March 2012, the Des Moines Register reported that "Unemployment here is 7.6 percent, compared with the 5.4 percent state average".

In 2022 Ben Jacobs of The New Republic wrote that the area's economy had more problems related to late 20th century globalization compared to that of Dubuque, Iowa.

=== Downtown Burlington ===
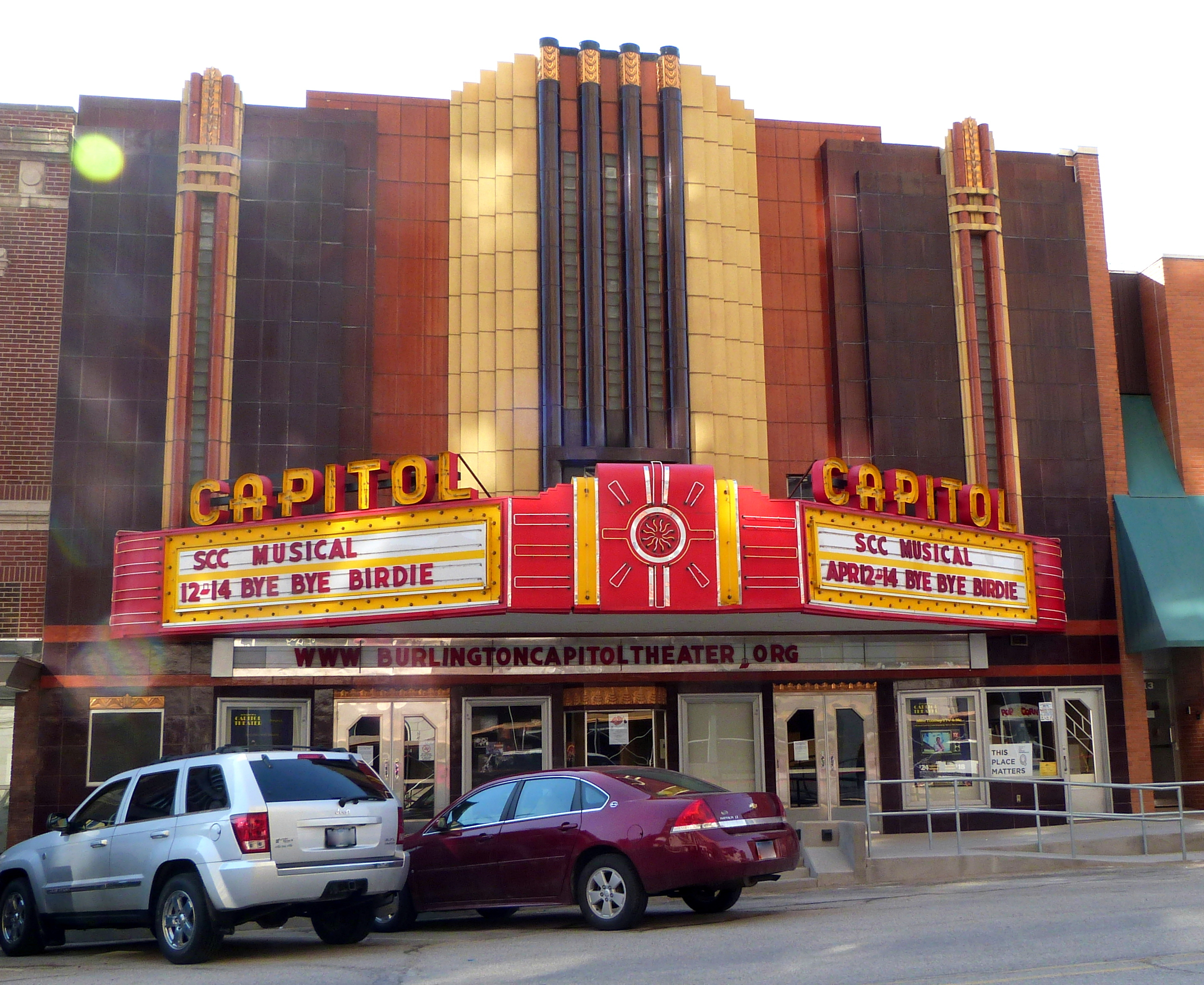
Capitol Theater

The downtown area holds a number of buildings listed on the National Register of Historic Places, among them the Burlington Apartments (listed as the Hotel Burlington), the Burlington Railroad Depot, the Des Moines County Courthouse, the Burlington Fire Department central station, the Port of Burlington building, Memorial Auditorium, River Park Place (as Burlington Mercy Hospital), the former Burlington Police Department building (as Burlington Paper Company), The Capitol Theater, First Congregational Church, St. Paul's Catholic Church and several others. It is perhaps best known for Snake Alley, the most crooked street in the US. The downtown skyline is noted for its several church spires.

== Sports ==
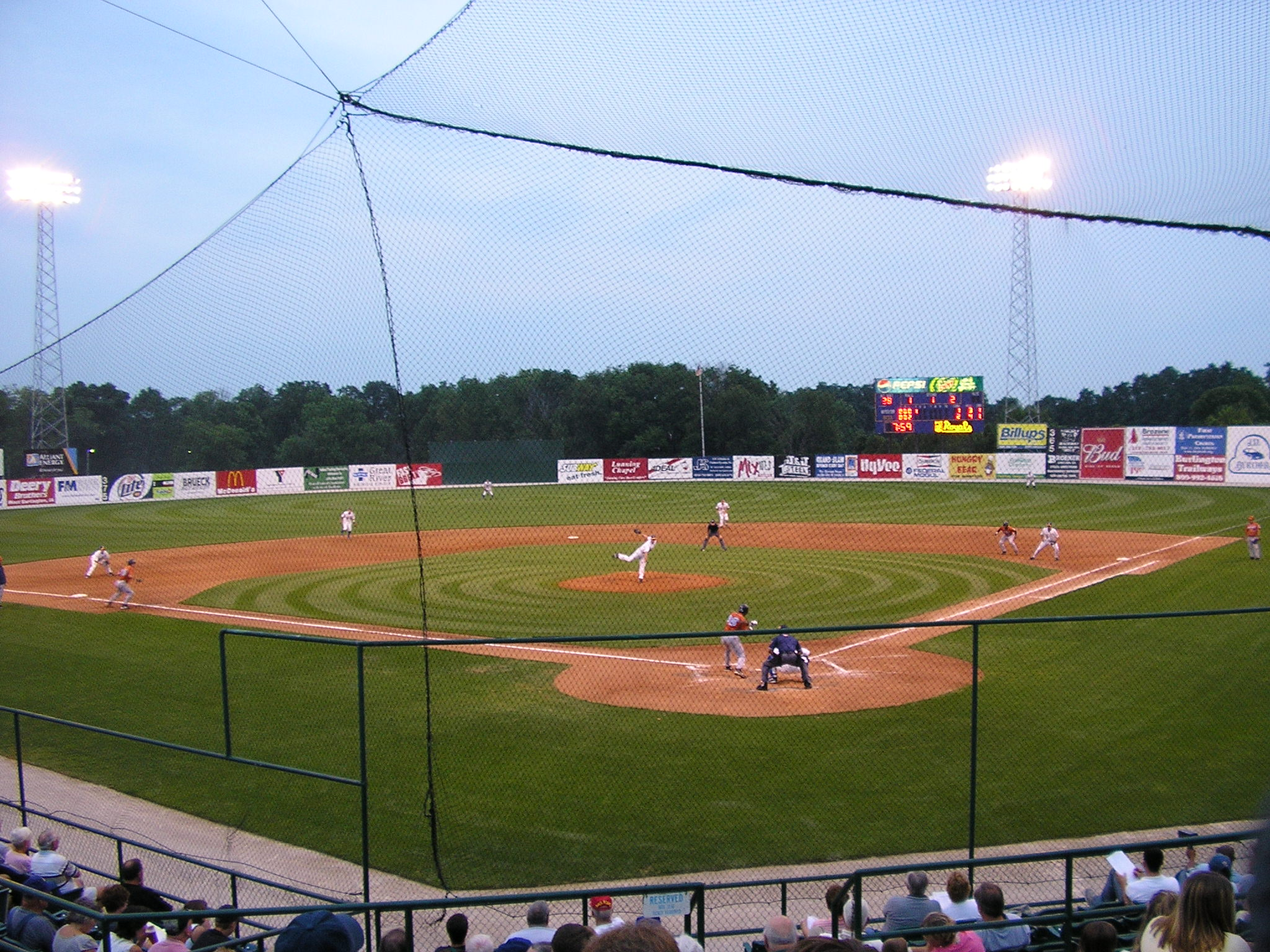
The Burlington Bees play the Swing of the Quad Cities in this July 2004 game at Burlington Community Field.

Burlington is the home of the Burlington Bees baseball team, a member of the Prospect League, a collegiate summer baseball league. They were previously members of Minor League Baseball's Class A Midwest League until Major League Baseball's reorganization of the minor leagues after the 2020 season. The Bees play at Community Field, which underwent extensive renovation in 2005. The Burlington Babies first began minor league play in the city in 1889.

Burlington hosts the Snake Alley Criterium, one of the most physically challenging races in the Midwest. The annual event is held on a 15-block course, with differences in elevation from 555 feet to 678 feet. The course is entirely on city streets, mostly in the downtown commercial area. A one-block-long climb is on the historic brick street named Snake Alley. The 276-foot-long Snake Alley has five switchbacks in a 60-foot climb. The average grade is 12.5 percent in that one block.

Burlington has been the finishing point for RAGBRAI twice. the annual bicycle ride that starts at the Missouri River in western Iowa and ends in eastern Iowa at the Mississippi River.

Burlington is also the home of the Burlington High School and Notre Dame High School sports teams. Also in the Burlington area are the sports teams of Southeastern Community College, which have had a successful history, including three men's basketball national championships.

Many people living in the area support athletic teams from Saint Louis, Missouri, differing from other parts of Iowa, which support other sports teams.

== Education ==
Burlington is served by the Burlington Community School District, which consists of five elementary schools, one intermediate school, one middle school, one high school and one alternative high school. Private education is also available for kindergarten through 12th grade at Notre Dame Catholic School and Great River Christian School (GRCS).

In 1833 the first school facility for Burlington opened in a log cabin. School District No. 2 of the Township of Burlington was established on March 29, 1849.

The Burlington School District has five elementary schools: North Hill, Sunnyside, Grimes, Corse and Black Hawk. All are new buildings or have been recently completely rehabilitated, the newest, North Hill Elementary, received its first students in 2009, there are no elementary school buildings within the school district that are over 40 years old. The district has two middle schools: Edward Stone and Aldo Leopold. Beginning with the 2010–11 school year, students who had attended Oak Street Middle School (an aging building that was completed around 1907) began attending Aldo Leopold (named in honor of ecologist, and environmentalist, Aldo Leopold, a former resident of Burlington, and author of "A Sand County Almanac"), the new school building is located near the corner of Sunnyside Avenue, and Roosevelt Avenue. Edward Stone, which opened at the start of the 2012–13 school year, is located near the corner of Lawrence Drive and Mason Road. The middle school was named in honor of former JPL head, and Burlington educated Dr. Edward Stone. This building replaced the James Madison Middle School building, which has only been in the system since the mid-1960s. These two new middle schools were built to accommodate more students after a third building, Horace Mann, was gutted by fire in 2005.

Burlington Community High School was constructed in 1968, and occupied the following year, with the first graduating class in June 1970. Prior to that, the high school students were educated at the former Apollo High School building located near the downtown business district; the building is still standing and for a time served as Burlington Alternative High School, but has been unoccupied since 1996. Notre Dame High School and Elementary schools occupy a building near the Burlington high school. Great River Christian Schools occupies the old Prospect Hill Elementary School building, 426 Harrison St. A third middle school building once existed on the edge of Perkins Park, named Horace Mann, that building was gutted by fire in 2005, and later razed. The school district offices are located near the corner of West Avenue, and White Street, in a large mansion once owned by Railroad tycoon Charles Elliott Perkins, and is nicknamed "The White House", due to the whitewashed facade. The original High School building (which now serves as the School District Maintenance shops) is noted as being the first high school built west of the Mississippi River.

Burlington is also served by Southeastern Community College.

The Burlington Public Library serves the community.

== Media ==
Burlington, Iowa is served by the following local media outlets:

Newspaper

- The Burlington Beacon is a community-focused local newspaper covering Des Moines County and southeast Iowa.
- The Hawk Eye is a morning newspaper published six days a week. The paper was established in 1837 and is Iowa's oldest newspaper.
- Des Moines County News is a once a week newspaper.

Radio

Burlington's radio stations include WQKQ 92.1 FM, KAYP 89.9 FM, KKMI 93.5 FM, KCDM 98.3 FM, KDMG 103.1 FM, KBKB 101.7 FM, KHDK 97.3 FM, KGRS 107.3 FM, KCPS 1150 AM, KBKB 1360 AM, and KBUR 1490 AM. Burlington residents also listen to stations in nearby communities, most notably, the Quad Cities.

TV

Burlington previously had a local TV station, KJMH. It signed on August 2, 1984, from a tower on Winegard Drive. It also had studios in Burlington. Initially an independent station, it became a charter FOX affiliate in 1986, but suffered from duplication from KLJB in the Quad Cities. In 1996, the station became a full-time satellite of KLJB, and now operates as Quad Cities station KGCW. Today, those in the Burlington-Oquawka area receive local over-the-air programming from stations in the Quad Cities (the city's main television market), Quincy, and Ottumwa, including the stations listed below.

- WHBF-TV CBS Channel 4.1 (RF 4); Rock Island, IL (Quad Cities)
- KWQC-TV NBC Channel 6.1 (RF 36); Davenport, IA (Quad Cities)
- KHQA-TV CBS Channel 7.1 (RF 7); Hannibal, MO (Quincy, IL)
- KHQA-TV ABC Channel 7.2 (RF 7); Hannibal, MO (Quincy, IL)
- WQAD-TV ABC Channel 8.1 (RF 38); Moline, IL (Quad Cities)
- WQAD-DT3 MyNetworkTV Channel 8.3 (RF 38); Moline, IL (Quad Cities)
- WGEM-TV NBC Channel 10.1 (RF 10); Quincy, IL
- WGEM-DT2 The CW Channel 10.2 (RF 10); Quincy, IL
- WGEM-DT3 Fox Channel 10.3 (RF 10); Quincy, IL
- KIIN PBS Channel 12.1 (RF 12); Iowa City, IA
- KYOU-TV Fox Channel 15.1 (RF 15); Ottumwa, IA
- WTJR CTN Channel 16.1 (RF 32); Quincy, IL
- KLJB Fox Channel 18.1 (RF 49); Davenport, IA (Quad Cities)
- KWKB This TV Channel 20.1 (RF 25); Iowa City, IA
- WMEC PBS Channel 22.1 (RF 21); Macomb, IL
- WQPT-TV PBS Channel 24.1 (RF 23); Moline, IL (Quad Cities)
- KGCW The CW Channel 26.1 (RF 41); Burlington, IA (Quad Cities, studio in Rock Island)
- KQIN PBS Channel 36.1 (RF 34); Davenport, IA (Quad Cities)

== Transportation ==
=== Roadways ===
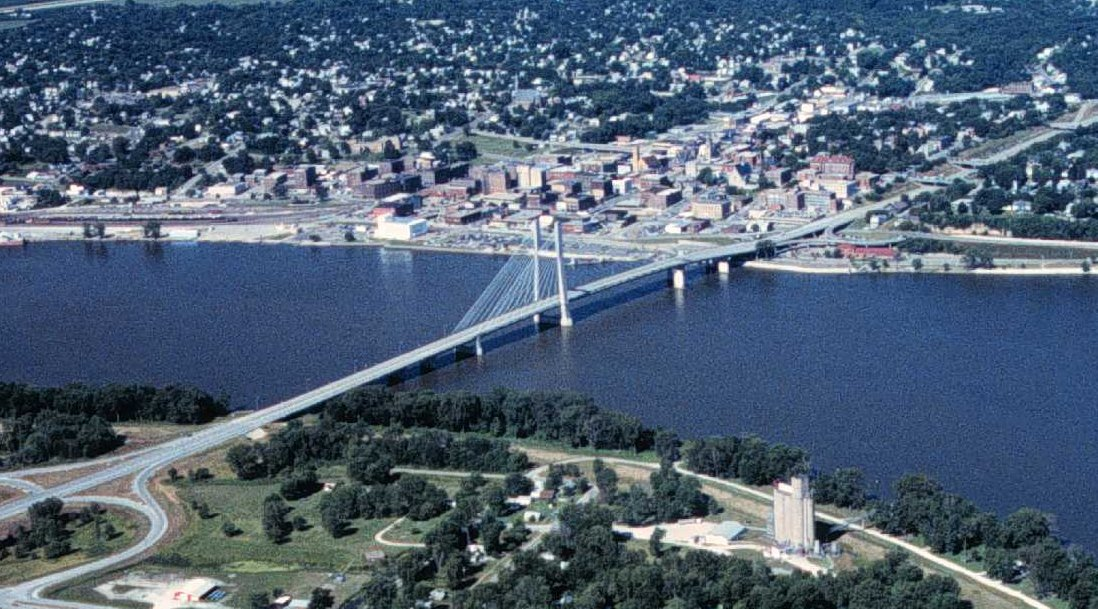
Great River Bridge in Burlington

The town is served by U.S. Route 34, which is the freeway that bisects the city, and U.S. Route 61. Iowa Highways 99 and 406 served the town before they were decommissioned in 2003. The two still exist as county roads.

=== Transit ===
Burlington Urban Service (B.U.S.) is a transportation system owned and operated by the City of Burlington. Routes service nearly all areas of Burlington, and nearly 90% of all residents live within three city blocks of a bus route. Burlington Trailways provided daily intercity bus service from its West Burlington hub, but it shut down in 2025.

=== Rail service ===
Amtrak, the national passenger rail system, provides service to Burlington, operating its California Zephyr daily in both directions between Chicago, Illinois, and Emeryville, California, across the bay from San Francisco. The older Burlington and Missouri River Railroad Passenger Station exists nearby and is also listed on the NRHP.

=== Airport ===
The Southeast Iowa Regional Airport (IATA code BRL), is located about 3 miles south of downtown. Quad City International Airport, the area's large international airport, is approximately 70 miles north of the city, in Moline, Illinois.

== Notable people ==
- Tony Baker, played in the National Football League
- George J. Bauer (1871–1942), Illinois state representative
- Robert Bierstedt (1913–1998), sociologist at the University of Virginia
- Tom Billups, American rugby player
- Harriet Connor Brown (1872-1962), writer and women's rights activist
- Wallace Carothers, inventor of nylon
- James Clarke, Governor of Iowa Territory
- John Murray Corse, American Civil War General
- Thomas Courtney, Iowa Senator
- Augustus C. Dodge, United States Senator from Iowa
- Henry Dodge (1782–1867) United States Senator from Wisconsin
- Wayne Duke, Commissioner of the Big Ten and Big Eight Conferences
- Marion Howard Dunham (1842–1921), teacher, activist, suffragist
- Grace Durand (1867–1948), businesswoman and dairy owner in Illinois
- William Frawley (1887–1966), actor, best known as Fred Mertz on the I Love Lucy show
- James L. Green, Director of the Planetary Science Division at NASA's Science Mission Directorate
- James Wilson Grimes U.S. Senator, the swing vote in the Impeachment of President Andrew Johnson
- Jack Hamilton, Major League Baseball player
- Serranus Clinton Hastings, U.S. Congressman and founder of the Hastings College of the Law
- Frank Hatton, United States Postmaster General
- Bart Howard, composer and writer of the jazz standard "Fly Me to the Moon"
- Jimmie E. Howard (1929–1993), received the Medal of Honor in Vietnam
- John Hurlburt (1898–1968), NFL player
- James M. Kelly, NASA Astronaut
- Jack Kent, Illustrator of the comic strip, King Aroo
- Karl C. Leebrick, president of Kent State University
- Aldo Leopold, naturalist and writer
- A. Starker Leopold, zoologist, and conservationist
- Everett Lindsay, NFL player
- Steve Macko (1954–1981), baseball player with the Chicago Cubs
- Arabella Mansfield, first female lawyer in the United States
- Robert J. Marshall, President of the Lutheran Church in America, 1968–1978
- Richard Paul Matsch, United States federal judge
- Brian D. Metzger, astrophysicist and professor at Columbia University
- John H. Mickey, 17th governor of Nebraska from 1903 to 1907
- May Naudain (1881–1923), musical theatre and vaudeville singer
- Robert Noyce, co-founder of Fairchild Semiconductor and Intel
- Kay A. Orr, Governor of Nebraska and the first Republican woman governor
- Matt Perisho, Major League Baseball player
- Charles Elliott Perkins (1840–1907), railroad tycoon Chicago, Burlington and Quincy Railroad
- George C. Remey (1841–1928), rear admiral of the U.S. Navy
- Mason Remey (1874–1974), religious leader of the American Baháʼí community
- William Butler Remey (1842–1895), Judge Advocate General of the Navy, 1880–1892
- George Scott III (1953-1980), punk bassist
- Edward C. Stone (1936-2024), director of the NASA Jet Propulsion Laboratory
- Elswyth Thane, romance novelist
- Charles Wachsmuth, paleontologist
- Zachary Bonner, Political Scientist
- Kurt Warner, Hall of Fame NFL quarterback
- Robert Watts, artist

== Sister cities ==
Burlington has one sister city, as designated by Sister Cities International:

- Barbacena, Minas Gerais, Brazil

== See also ==
- Crapo Park
- Burlington, North Dakota (named after Burlington, Iowa)
- USS Burlington (PF-51) World War II frigate named after Burlington.
- Church of St. John the Baptist
- Great River Bridge
