= National Register of Historic Places listings in Marion County, Iowa =

Location of Marion County in Iowa

This is a list of the National Register of Historic Places listings in Marion County, Iowa.

This is intended to be a complete list of the properties and districts on the National Register of Historic Places in Marion County, Iowa, United States. Latitude and longitude coordinates are provided for many National Register properties and districts; these locations may be seen together in a map.

There are 29 properties and districts listed on the National Register in the county.

This National Park Service list is complete through NPS recent listings posted November 21, 2025.

== Current listings ==
	Name on the Register	Image	Date listed	Location	City or town	Description
1	Chicago, Rock Island and Pacific Passenger Depot-Pella	Chicago, Rock Island and Pacific Passenger Depot-Pella	July 22, 1991 (#91000909)	Junction of Main and Oskaloosa Sts. 41°23′54″N 92°54′54″W	Pella	
2	Coal Ridge Baptist Church and Cemetery	Coal Ridge Baptist Church and Cemetery	August 23, 2006 (#06000711)	1034 Iowa Highway 71; 41°22′41″N 93°01′15″W	Knoxville	
3	Collegiate Neighborhood Historic District	Collegiate Neighborhood Historic District	October 26, 2017 (#100001766)	Main to W. 1st, Independence to Union & w. side of W. 1st to Liberty Sts. 41°24′11″N 92°55′06″W	Pella	
4	East Amsterdam School	East Amsterdam School	December 1, 2000 (#00001471)	1010 198th Place; 41°22′34″N 92°57′28″W	Pella	
5	Evan F. Ellis Farmhouse	Evan F. Ellis Farmhouse	January 3, 1985 (#85000006)	Junction of Story and West Sts. 41°13′10″N 92°53′20″W	Bussey	
6	First Christian Church	First Christian Church	March 29, 2007 (#07000206)	824 Franklin St. 41°24′26″N 92°55′09″W	Pella	
7	Hammond Bridge	Hammond Bridge	May 15, 1998 (#98000500)	170th Pl. over North Cedar Creek; 41°10′39″N 93°00′50″W	Hamilton	
8	Harvey Railroad Bridge	Harvey Railroad Bridge	May 15, 1998 (#98000502)	Harvey Island Rd. 41°19′02″N 92°54′36″W	Harvey	
9	E.R. Hays House	E.R. Hays House	September 27, 1984 (#84001283)	301 N. 2nd St. 41°19′16″N 93°05′49″W	Knoxville	
10	Knoxville Veterans Administration Hospital Historic District	Knoxville Veterans Administration Hospital Historic District	May 1, 2012 (#12000246)	1515 W. Pleasant St. 41°19′20″N 93°06′51″W	Knoxville	United States Second Generation Veterans Hospitals Multiple Property Submission
11	Knoxville WPA Athletic Field Historic District	Knoxville WPA Athletic Field Historic District	August 2, 2007 (#07000775)	Bounded by Lincoln St., Robinson St., Stadium St., and Marion St. 41°19′08″N 93°06′31″W	Knoxville	
12	Philipus J. and Cornelia Koelman House	Philipus J. and Cornelia Koelman House	December 21, 2005 (#05001430)	1005 Broadway St. 41°24′35″N 92°55′06″W	Pella	
13	Marion County Courthouse	Marion County Courthouse	July 2, 1981 (#81000256)	Main St. 41°19′06″N 93°05′48″W	Knoxville	
14	Pella City Hall, Fire Station, and Jail		November 21, 2025 (#100012352)	604 Main Street; 41°24′16″N 92°54′59″W	Pella	
15	Pella High School		October 19, 2020 (#100005684)	712 Union St. 41°24′16″N 92°55′04″W	Pella	
16	Pella Opera House	Pella Opera House	March 20, 1992 (#91001080)	611 Franklin St. 41°24′23″N 92°54′51″W	Pella	
17	Peoples National Bank	Peoples National Bank	April 21, 2010 (#10000202)	717 Main St. 41°24′20″N 92°54′59″W	Pella	
18	Porter-Rhynsburger House	Porter-Rhynsburger House	August 28, 2003 (#03000837)	514 Broadway St. 41°24′14″N 92°55′06″W	Pella	
19	St. Joseph's Roman Catholic Church and Cemetery Historic District	St. Joseph's Roman Catholic Church and Cemetery Historic District	January 24, 1995 (#94001580)	1 mile (1.6 km) east of the junction of County Road G76 and SE. 97th St. 41°12′12″N 93°18′29″W	Lacona	
20	Dominie Henry P. Scholte House	Dominie Henry P. Scholte House	December 10, 1982 (#82000415)	739 Washington St. 41°24′30″N 92°55′02″W	Pella	
21	Ten Hagen Cottage-Stegman Store	Ten Hagen Cottage-Stegman Store	July 16, 2008 (#08000685)	1110 W. Washington St. 41°24′29″N 92°55′25″W	Pella	
22	Thomas F. and Nancy Tuttle House	Thomas F. and Nancy Tuttle House	January 27, 2015 (#14001209)	608 Lincoln St. 41°24′39″N 92°54′55″W	Pella	
23	William Van Asch House-Huibert Debooy Commercial Room	William Van Asch House-Huibert Debooy Commercial Room	December 2, 1987 (#87002056)	1105, 1107, and 1109 W. Washington St. 41°24′28″N 92°55′27″W	Pella	
24	Hendrik J. and Wilhelmina H. Van Den Berg Cottage	Hendrik J. and Wilhelmina H. Van Den Berg Cottage	August 28, 2003 (#03000835)	1305 W. Washington St. 41°24′14″N 92°55′42″W	Pella	
25	Dirk Van Loon House	Dirk Van Loon House	November 17, 1977 (#77000539)	1401 University Ave. 41°24′02″N 92°55′33″W	Pella	
26	Henry and Johanna Van Maren House-Diamond Filling Station	Henry and Johanna Van Maren House-Diamond Filling Station	July 10, 2008 (#08000683)	615 Main St. 41°24′15″N 92°54′59″W	Pella	
27	B.H. and J.H.H. Van Spanckeren Row Houses	B.H. and J.H.H. Van Spanckeren Row Houses	February 12, 1990 (#90000004)	505-507 Franklin St. 41°24′08″N 92°54′30″W	Pella	
28	Dirk and Cornelia J. Vander Wilt Cottage	Dirk and Cornelia J. Vander Wilt Cottage	August 8, 2001 (#01000856)	925 Broadway St. 41°24′32″N 92°55′06″W	Pella	
29	Wabash Railroad Bridge	Wabash Railroad Bridge	May 15, 1998 (#98000501)	216th Pl. over the Des Moines River; 41°20′26″N 92°56′25″W	Pella	

== See also ==
- List of National Historic Landmarks in Iowa
- National Register of Historic Places listings in Iowa
- Listings in neighboring counties: Jasper, Lucas, Mahaska, Monroe, Warren
