= DiCamillo =

DiCamillo is a surname. Notable people with the surname include:

- Brandon DiCamillo (born 1976), American actor, stuntman, and screenwriter
- Gary T. DiCamillo (born c. 1952), American businessman
- Kate DiCamillo (born 1964), American writer

== See also ==
- DiCamillo Bakery, Italian American family-run bakery chain founded in 1920
