= Veteran (disambiguation) =

A veteran, often referred to as a military veteran or war veteran, is a person who has served in the armed forces.

Veteran or Veterans or The Veteran may also refer to:

== Places ==
=== United States ===
- Veteran, Nevada
- Veteran, New York
- Veteran, Ulster County, New York
- Veteran, Wyoming
- Veterans Stadium (New Britain, Connecticut)
- Veterans Stadium, Philadelphia, Pennsylvania

=== Other places ===
- Veteran, Alberta, Canada
- Veteran, Queensland, Australia

== People ==
- Julius the Veteran (3rd century), a Roman soldier and saint

== Arts, entertainment, and media ==
=== Films ===
- The Veteran (1972 film), horror film
- The Veteran (2006 film), a 2006 American made-for-TV war film
- The Veteran (2011 film), a 2011 British action film
- Veteran (2015 film), a 2015 South Korean film

=== Literature ===
- The Veteran (short story collection), a book by Frederick Forsyth and the titular story
- The Veteran, a novel by Stephen Crane

=== Music ===
- Veteran (Marques Houston album), 2007 album by American R&B artist Marques Houston
- Veteran (JPEGMafia album), 2018 album by American rapper JPEGMafia
- "The Veteran", a Taiwan's military and patriotic song.
- "The Veteran", a song by British clergyman and composer Joseph Philip Knight
- "VETERAN”, a song by American rapper Destroy Lonely and Ken Carson on the mixtape No Stylist.

=== Television ===
- "Veterans" (Justified), a 2010 episode of Justified

== Healthcare ==
=== Hospitals ===
- Veterans Administration Hospital (disambiguation)
- Veterans General Hospital, a national hospital in Taiwan
- Veterans Memorial Medical Center, a public hospital in the Philippines

== Ships ==
- French ship Vétéran (1803)
- HMS Veteran, the name of three ships of the Royal Navy

== Other uses ==
- Veteran car, a car built before 1905
- Veteran tree, trees of distinction due to age

== See also ==
- Sons of Veterans (disambiguation)
- Veterans Bridge (disambiguation)
- Veterans Day (disambiguation)
- Veterans Memorial Auditorium (disambiguation)
