= Veterans Administration Hospital (disambiguation) =

Veterans Administration Hospital or Veterans Administration Medical Center is a term used to refer to one of the medical facilities operated by the Veterans Health Administration, a division of the U.S. Department of Veterans Affairs.

It may refer to one of the following specific medical facilities or former medical facilities:

- Albuquerque Veterans Administration Medical Center, Albuquerque, New Mexico, listed on the NRHP in Bernalillo County, New Mexico
- Biloxi Veterans Administration Medical Center, Biloxi, Mississippi, listed on the NRHP in Harrison County, Mississippi
- Fort Whipple-Department of Veterans Affairs Medical Center Historic District, Prescott, Arizona, listed on the NRHP in Prescott, Arizona
- Knoxville Veterans Administration Hospital Historic District, Knoxville, Iowa, listed on the NRHP in Marion County, Iowa
- Montana Veterans and Pioneers Memorial Building, Helena, Montana, listed on the NRHP in Lewis and Clark County, Montana
- Oteen Veterans Administration Hospital Historic District, Asheville, North Carolina
- Veterans Administration Hospital (California State University), Long Beach, California
- Veterans Administration Hospital (Jefferson Barracks), Lemay, Missouri
- Veterans Administration Hospital (Little Rock, Arkansas), listed on the National Register of Historic Places in Pulaski County, Arkansas
- Veterans Administration Hospital (Salt Lake City), listed on the National Register of Historic Places in Salt Lake City, Utah
- Veterans Administration Hospital Historic District, Waco, Texas, listed on the NRHP in McLennan County, Texas
- Veterans Administration Medical Center (Alexandria, Louisiana), listed on the NRHP in Rapides Parish, Louisiana
- Veterans Administration Medical Center (Grant County, Indiana)

== See also ==
- List of Veterans Affairs medical facilities
