= Dirk Van Loon House =

Historic house in Iowa, United States

- U.S. National Register of Historic Places
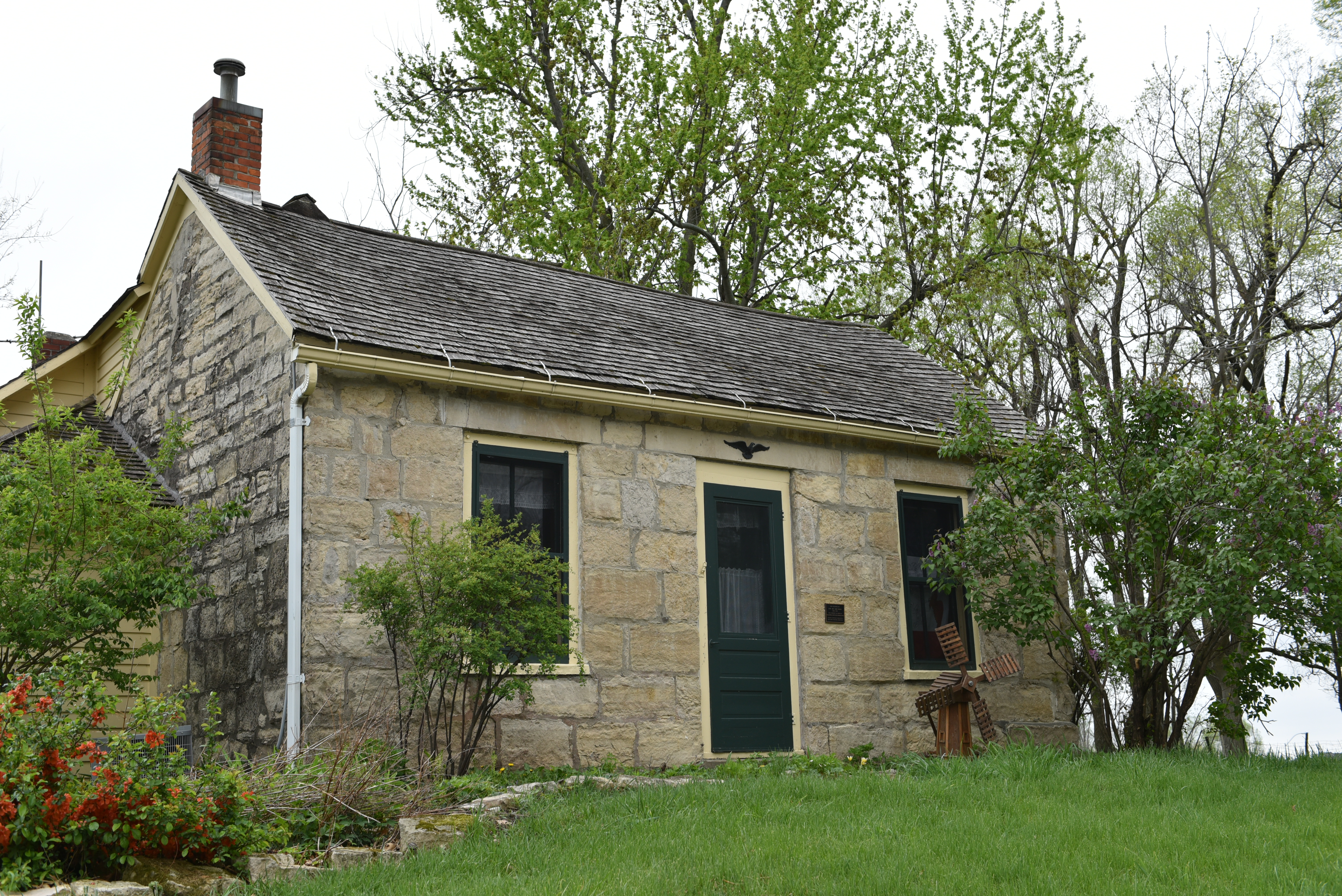

- Location within Iowa Location within the United States
- Location: 1401 University Ave. Pella, Iowa
- Coordinates: 41°24′0″N 92°55′43″W
- Area: less than one acre
- Built: 1857
- Built by: Dirk Van Loon
- NRHP reference No.: 77000539
- Added to NRHP: November 17, 1977

The Dirk Van Loon House – also known as the Rock House – is an historic residence located in Pella, Iowa, United States. Van Loon was a native of the Netherlands who immigrated to Pella in 1856. He bought this property from Dominie Scholte, the town's founder. Van Loon built the single-story, coarsely dressed, native limestone structure, and the frame addition off the back as his family grew. In 1875, he became a homesteader in Kansas. The house was listed on the National Register of Historic Places in 1982.
