= Peoples National Bank (Pella, Iowa) =

- U.S. National Register of Historic Places
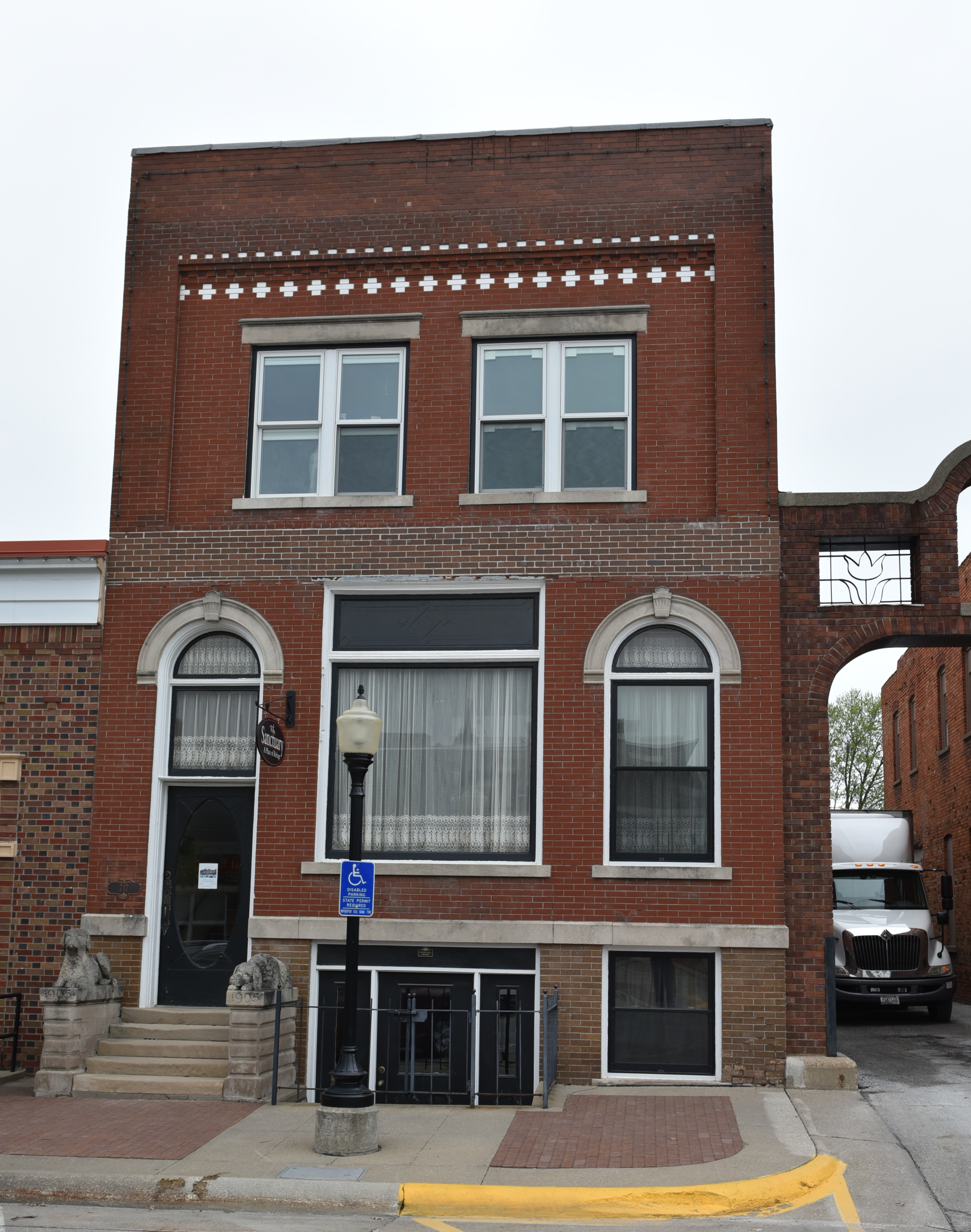

- Location within Iowa Location within the United States
- Location: 717 Main St. Pella, Iowa
- Coordinates: 41°24′21.4″N 92°55′0.6″W
- Area: less than one acre
- Built: 1905
- Built by: George Heeren (woodwork)
- Architect: Stanley DeGoyer
- Architectural style: Classical Revival
- NRHP reference No.: 10000202
- Added to NRHP: April 21, 2010

Peoples National Bank is a historic building located in Pella, Iowa, United States. It is significant for its association with Herman Rietveld, a local booster and civic leader during the Progressive Era. Completed in 1905, the building was designed for Rietveld's progressive ideas that called for dense occupancy which lead to efficiency and lowered the building's costs. When it opened the building housed two banks, two newspaper offices, a printing plant, and space for other offices on the second floor. Rietveld, along with John Rhynsberger and B. H. Van Spanckeren, founded the banks at the time the building was completed. They failed ten years later because of bad business decisions. The building was acquired the following year by the City of Pella who converted it for use as a city hall beginning in 1917. It served that purpose until 2007. This too was an expression of the Progressive era as it consolidated the various functions of the local government in one location symbolizing efficiency and economy.

The building's design is attributed to local architect Stanley DeGoyer, of which little is known. George Heeren, a local cabinet maker, provided the interior woodwork and some of the furniture. While none of his furniture has been identified in the building, the Art Nouveau staircase leading to the basement is his work. The building was listed on the National Register of Historic Places in 2010. The designation also includes the life-size cast concrete dog statues at the main entrance. They are commercial art castings that the banks used in their advertising.
