= Philipus J. and Cornelia Koelman House =

Historic house in Iowa, United States

- U.S. National Register of Historic Places
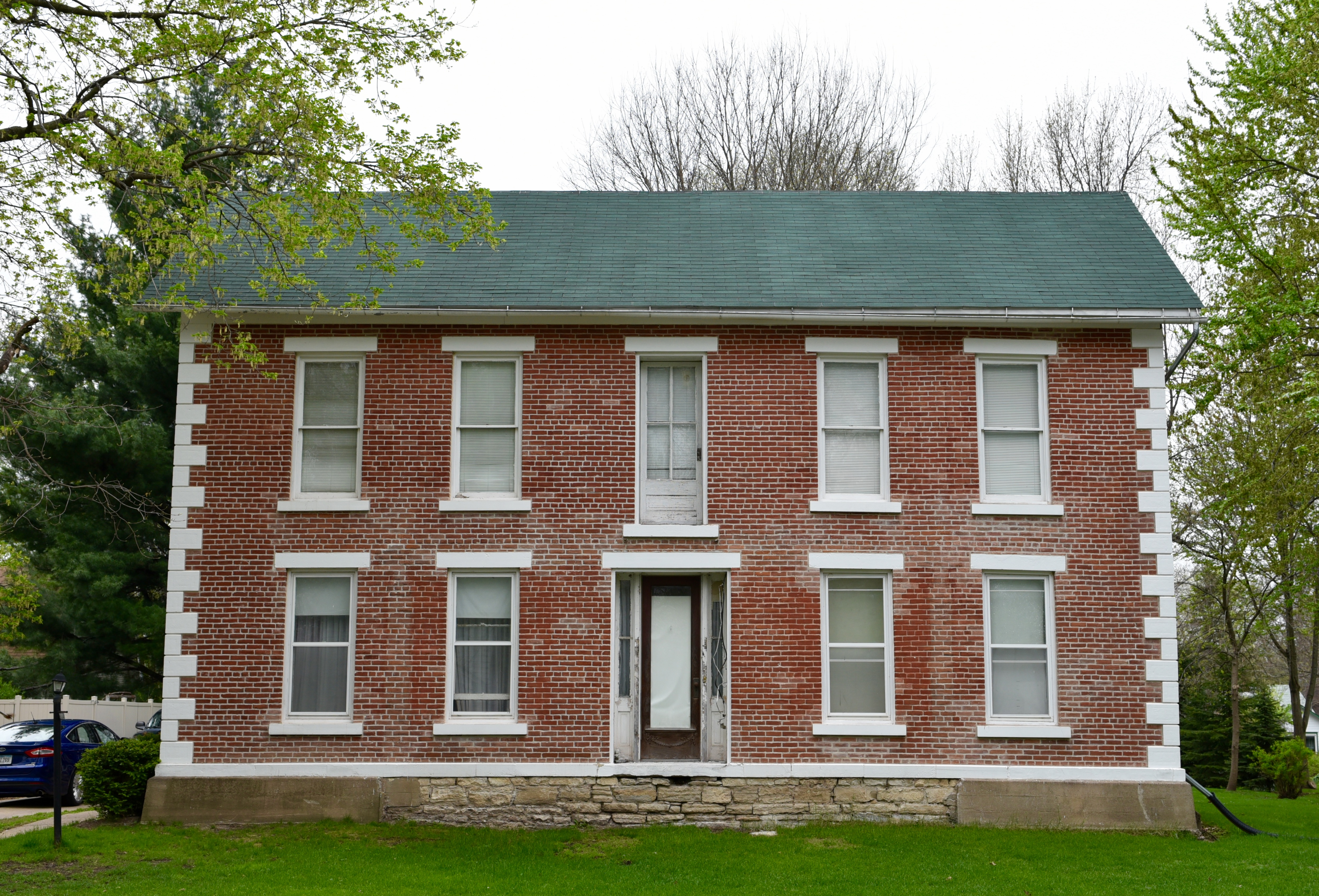

- Location within Iowa Location within the United States
- Location: 1005 Broadway St. Pella, Iowa
- Coordinates: 41°24′35.5″N 92°55′07″W
- Area: less than one acre
- Built: 1877
- Built by: Philipus J. Koelman
- Architectural style: Mid 19th Century Revival
- NRHP reference No.: 05001430
- Added to NRHP: December 21, 2005

The Philipus J. and Cornelia Koelman House, also known as the D.C. Van Zante House, is a historic residence located in Pella, Iowa, United States. Philipus, his father and sister were part of the first colony of settlers in Pella from the Netherlands in 1847. He went into farming and when he retired to this house, he owned five farms. His two-story brick house is a transitional structure. It combines the Dutch construction techniques of the early settlers with American architectural design. The latter is found the house's basic I-house design, and the Renaissance Revival detailing. The former is found in the use of beam anchors and the floor system where the flooring rests on top of the floor joists without a subfloor between them. The original stoop porch with its saw-tooth railing was replaced around 1905 with a sitting porch that covered the three center bays and had a railing that encircled the second floor porch. It was removed in 2001. The house was listed on the National Register of Historic Places in 2005.
