= Porter-Rhynsburger House =

Historic house in Iowa, United States

- U.S. National Register of Historic Places
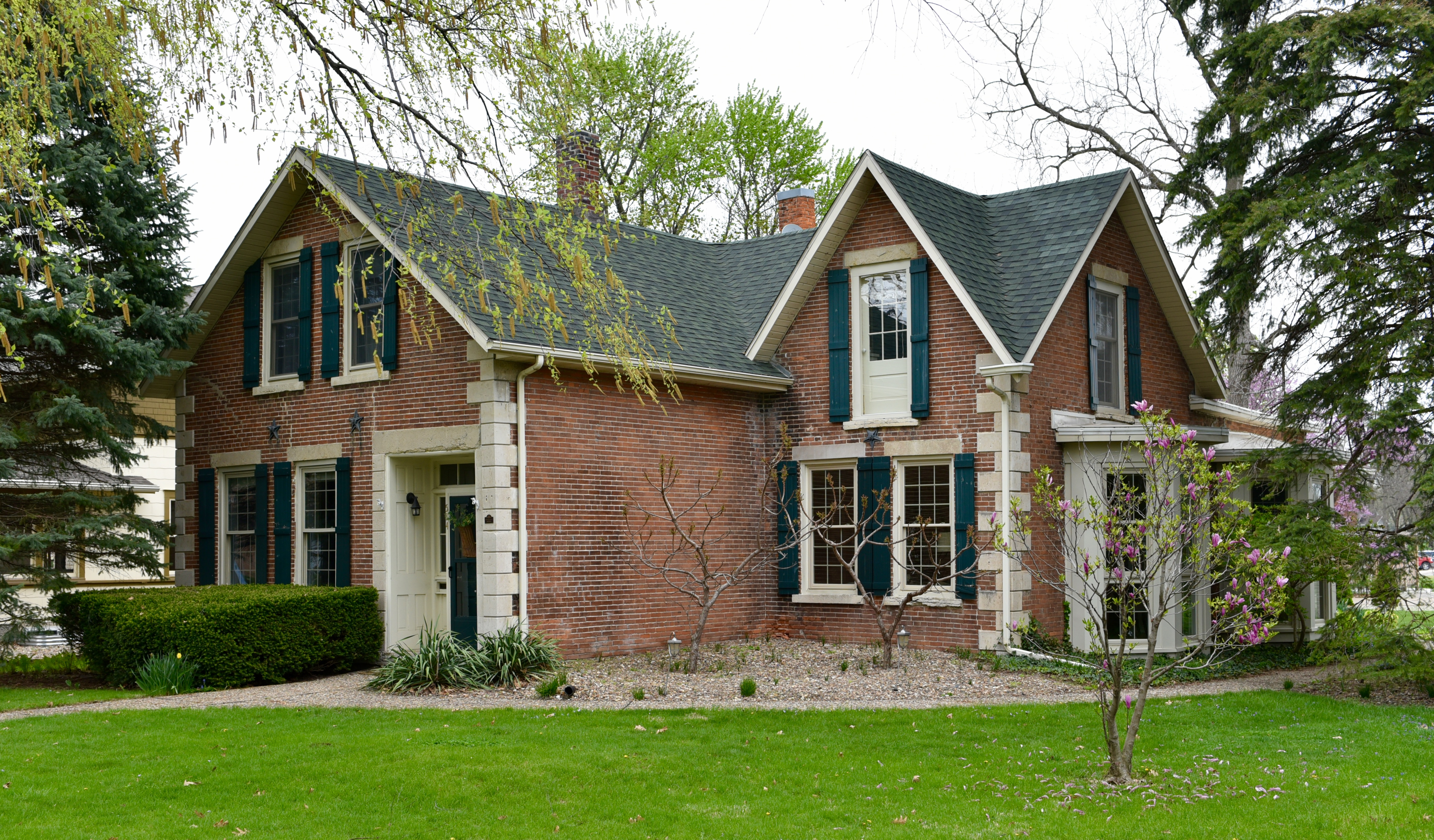

- Location within Iowa Location within the United States
- Location: 514 Broadway St. Pella, Iowa
- Coordinates: 41°24′14″N 92°55′6″W
- Built: 1855
- Architectural style: Mid 19th Century Revival
- NRHP reference No.: 03000837
- Added to NRHP: August 28, 2003

The Porter-Rhynsburger House is an historic building located in Pella, Iowa, United States. The house was built by Joseph Potter in 1855. It was subsequently purchased by C. Rhynsburger who expanded it in 1870. He was born in the Netherlands in 1839 and immigrated to Pella in 1855. He initially was engaged in farming before he began a successful mercantile business in 1861. He married R. Vander Ley and they raised eight children. It is one of only a few houses that were built by Pella's first settlers. The house was listed on the National Register of Historic Places in 2003.
