= Wabash Railroad Bridge =

- U.S. National Register of Historic Places
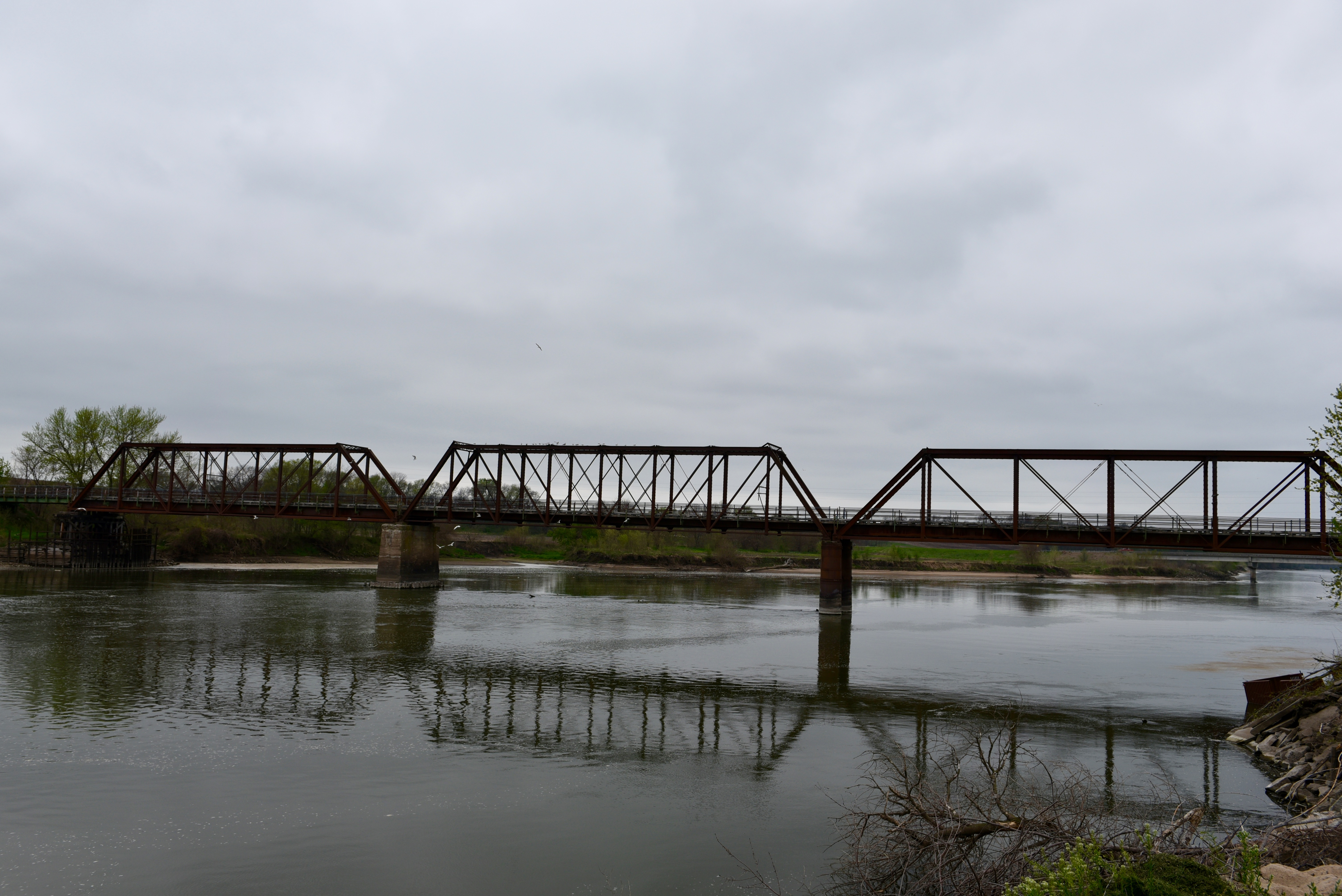

- Location within Iowa Location within the United States
- Location: 216th Pl. over the Des Moines River
- Nearest city: Pella, Iowa
- Coordinates: 41°20′29″N 92°56′26″W
- Area: less than one acre
- Built: 1882
- Architect: Wabash Railroad
- Architectural style: Pratt through truss
- MPS: Highway Bridges of Iowa MPS
- NRHP reference No.: 98000501
- Added to NRHP: May 15, 1998

The Wabash Railroad Bridge is a historic structure located south of Pella, Iowa, United States. It spans the Des Moines River for 561 feet (171 m). The Des Moines and St. Louis Railroad (D&S) was built through the central part of Marion County in 1882. This bridge was probably built at that time. It is a three span, wrought iron, Pratt through truss manufactured by the Carnegie Steel Company. The Wabash, St. Louis and Pacific Railroad, the Wabash Railroad, eventually acquired the D&S and this bridge. It remained in use as a railroad bridge until about 1946 when the county acquired the bridge and the right-of-way for a county road. They rehabilitated it in 1951, replacing part of the substructure. The bridge was listed on the National Register of Historic Places in 1998.
