= B.H. and J.H.H. Van Spanckeren Row Houses =

Historic house in Iowa, United States

- B.H. and J.H.H. Van Spanckeren; Row Houses
- U.S. National Register of Historic Places
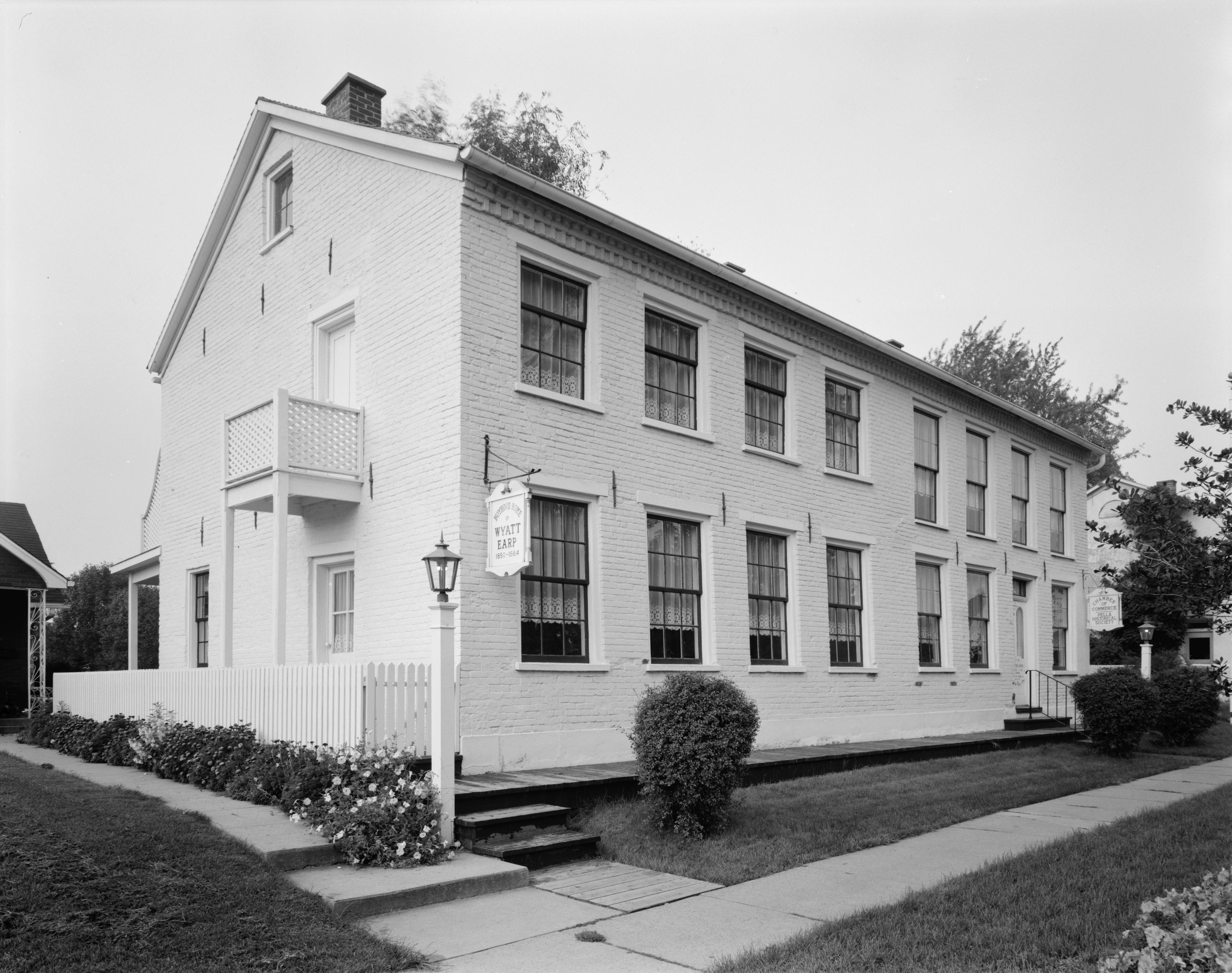

- Location within Iowa Location within the United States
- Location: 505-507 Franklin St. Pella, Iowa
- Coordinates: 41°24′23″N 92°54′49″W
- Area: less than one acre
- Built: 1855-c.1860
- NRHP reference No.: 90000004
- Added to NRHP: February 12, 1990

The B.H. and J.H.H. Van Spanckeren Row Houses, also known as the Wyatt Earp House and the Pella Historical Society, is an historic building located in Pella, Iowa, United States. The Van Spanckerens were brothers who, along with their mother, Catharina Reerink Van Spanckeren and two other siblings emigrated from the Netherlands in the 1840s. Catharina bought property in Pella in 1849, which she divided into three parcels and sold to her three sons. B.H. and J.H.H. built this rowhouse sometime between 1855 and 1860, while the third brother sold his parcel in 1864. The shared wall of this two-story brick house is on the property line. Both houses were divided into two units. In 505 both units were separate apartments. American frontier lawman Wyatt Earp spent 14 years of his boyhood in this row house. In 507, the upstairs was an apartment while the downstairs housed J.H.H.'s general store. Both houses were owned by separate owners until 1966.

Dutch building techniques were utilized in the construction of both houses. They include the use of beam anchors, which are similar to tie rods, a floor system where the flooring rests on top of the floor joists without the use of a subfloor, the double hung windows on the second floor in 505 with the unique three over six configuration, and an economy of space that is provided in a rowhouse that was a rarity in Pella. The house was listed on the National Register of Historic Places in 1990. It is now part of the Pella Historical Village, a museum operated by the Pella Historical Society.
