= Henry and Johanna Van Maren House-Diamond Filling Station =

Historic house in Iowa, United States

- Henry and Johanna Van Maren House- Diamond Filling Station
- U.S. National Register of Historic Places
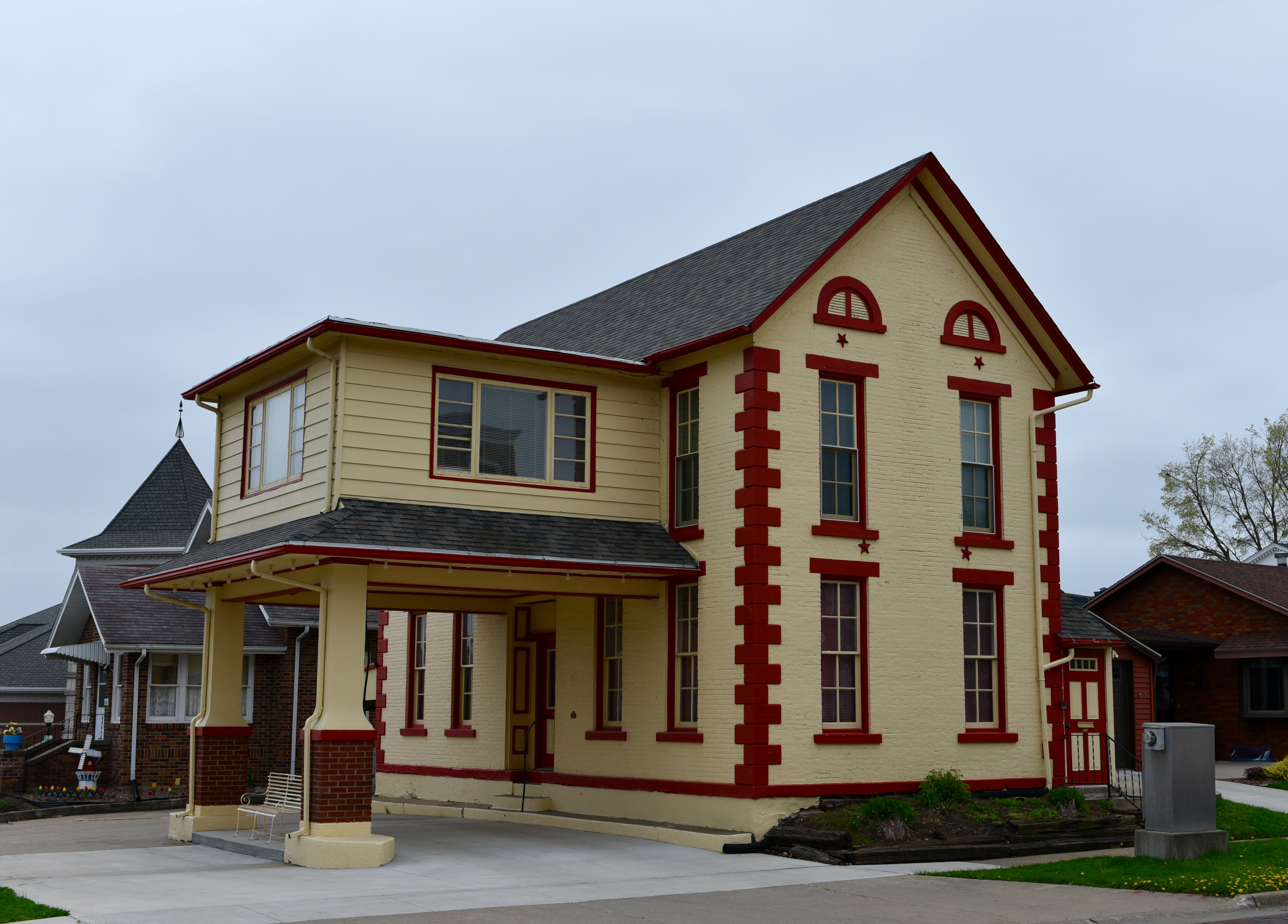

- Location within Iowa Location within the United States
- Location: 615 Main St. Pella, Iowa
- Coordinates: 41°24′18.8″N 92°55′0.5″W
- Area: less than one acre
- Built: 1877, 1928
- Architectural style: Mid 19th Century Revival
- NRHP reference No.: 08000683
- Added to NRHP: July 10, 2008

The Henry and Johanna Van Maren House-Diamond Filling Station is a historic building located in Pella, Iowa, United States. The Van Marens had this two-story brick building constructed for their family home in 1877. Both were first generation immigrants from the Netherlands. Henry was a wagon and carriage-maker. They bought the property their home stands on under Johanna's name, and it remained in her name until she died in 1912 and it passed to Henry.

In 1928 the house was converted for use as a filling station. John operated the station. They lived in the second-floor apartment. The yellow and red paint scheme are the Diamond Oil Company's colors. The canopy, added in 1928, originally had a gable roof with half-timbering in the gable end. It was altered to its present appearance in 1956. The gas pumps were located between the columns. In 1955 the filling station became a D-X station. Cordelia Vander Linden sold the property in 1967. The building's conversion into a filling station is what makes it historically significant. It has subsequently housed a travel agency, realtor office, and potter's studio. The building was listed on the National Register of Historic Places in 2008.
