= Dirk and Cornelia J. Vander Wilt Cottage =

Historic house in Iowa, United States

- U.S. National Register of Historic Places
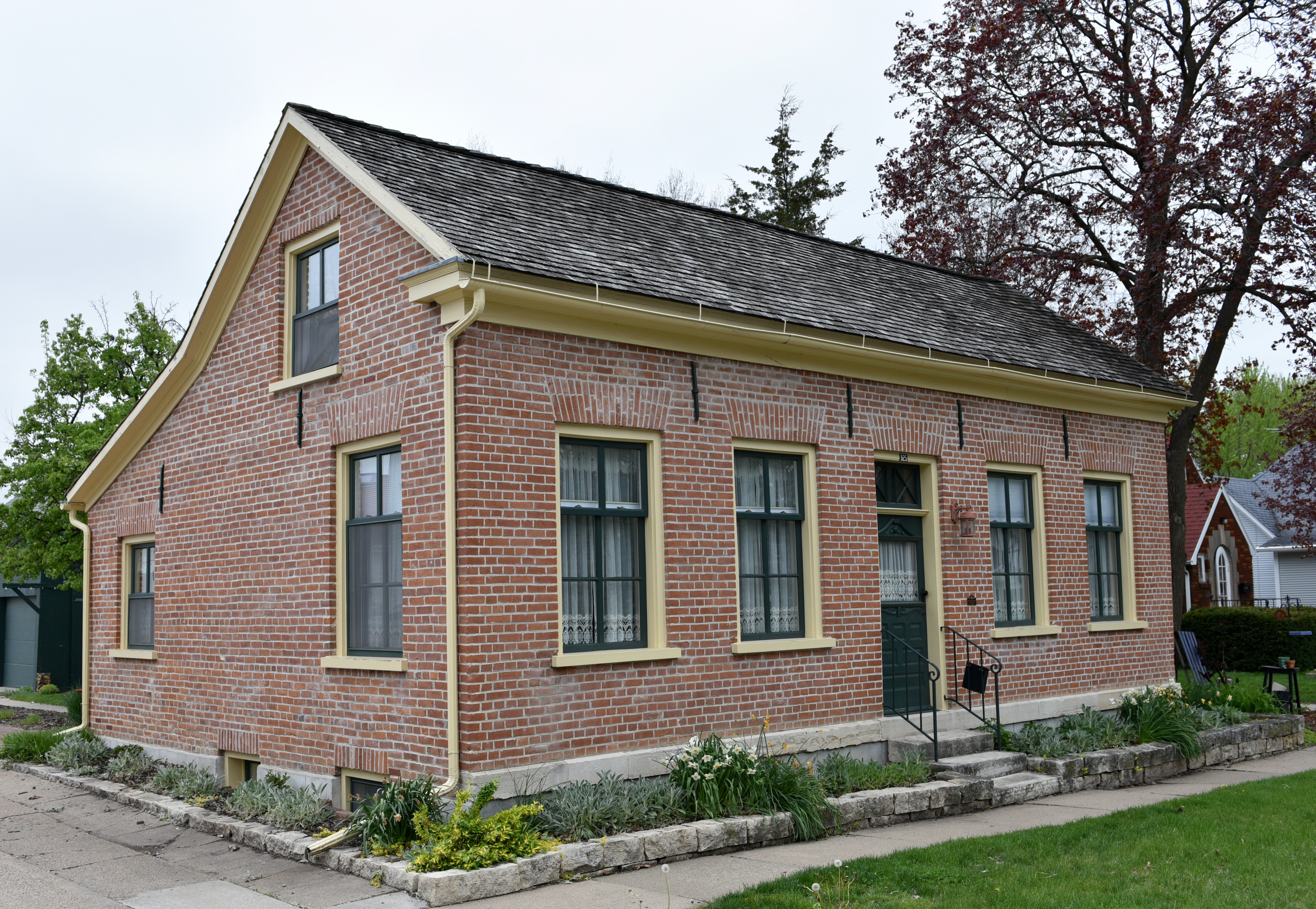

- Location within Iowa Location within the United States
- Location: 925 Broadway St. Pella, Iowa
- Coordinates: 41°24′32″N 92°55′06″W
- Area: less than one acre
- Built: 1854
- NRHP reference No.: 01000856
- Added to NRHP: August 8, 2001

The Dirk and Cornelia J. Vander Wilt Cottage, also known as the Vermeer House and the Wayne D. Stienstra House, is an historic residence located in Pella, Iowa, United States. It is a first generation residential building that exemplifies the architectural influence of the Netherlands, the homeland of Pella's early Dutch immigrants. The Dutch building techniques utilized in this 1½-story brick house include the use of beam anchors, which are similar to tie rods, a floor system where the flooring rests on top of the floor joists without the use of a subfloor, and an economy of space. The house was listed on the National Register of Historic Places in 2001.
