= Collegiate Neighborhood Historic District =

Historic district in Iowa, United States

- U.S. National Register of Historic Places
- U.S. Historic district
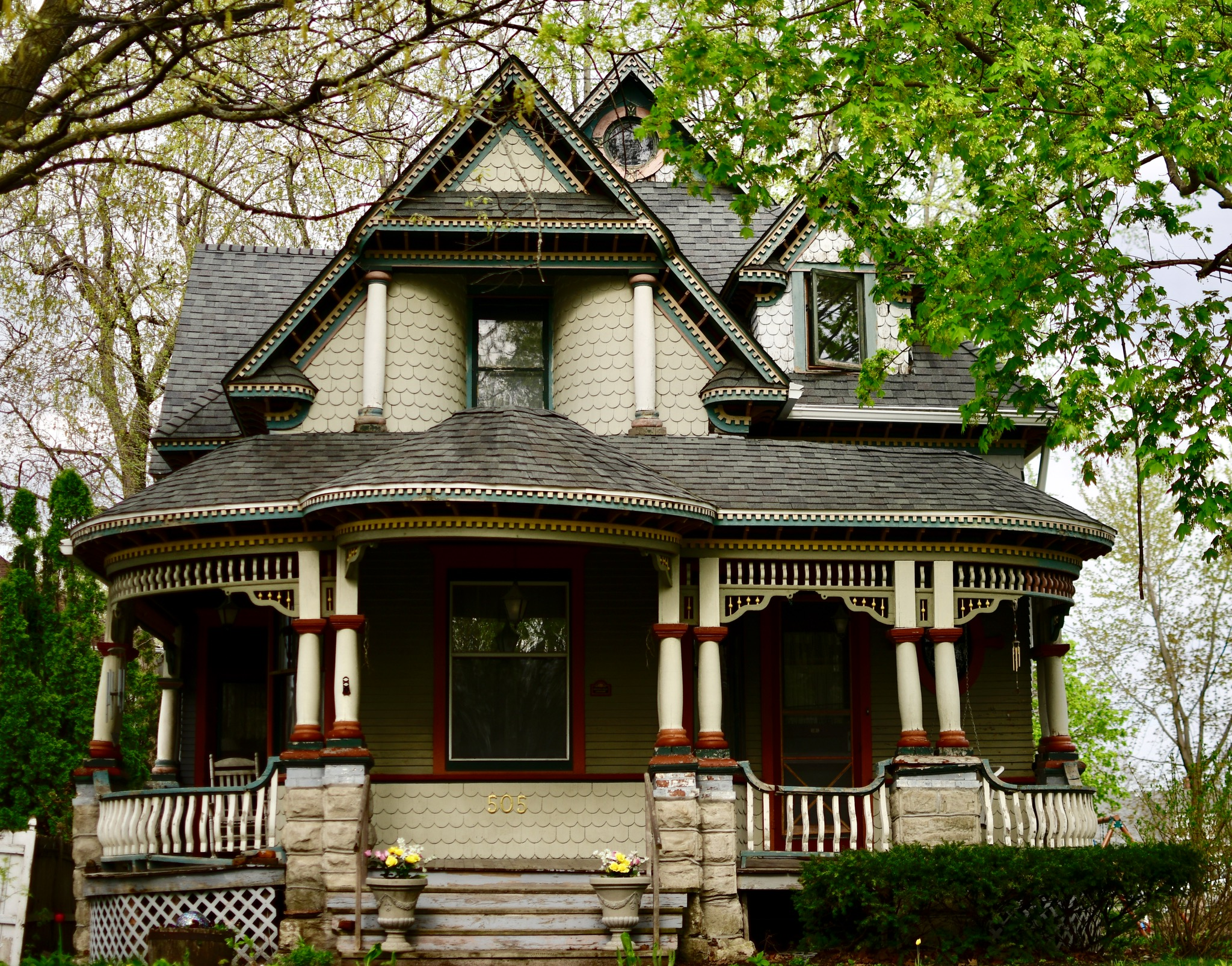
- 505 W. First Street

- Location within Iowa Location within the United States
- Location: Main to W. 1st, Independence to Union & w. side of W. 1st to Liberty Sts., Pella, Iowa
- Coordinates: 41°24′11″N 92°55′06″W
- NRHP reference No.: 100001766
- Added to NRHP: October 26, 2017

Collegiate Neighborhood Historic District is a nationally recognized historic district located in Pella, Iowa, United States. It was listed on the National Register of Historic Places in 2017. The district is a residential area located between the central business district to the north and Central College to the south. It is the first historic district in Pella. The neighborhood contains architecture that was popular from the late 19th century to the mid-20th century. Most of the houses are single-family dwellings that are uniformly set back from the street. It also features buildings that were constructed according to traditional Dutch building practices that were brought to Pella in the 19th century by people who settled here from the Netherlands. Independence and West First Streets are paved with brick.
