= Ten Hagen Cottage–Stegeman Store =

Historic house in Iowa, United States

- Ten Hagen Cottage–Stegman Store
- U.S. National Register of Historic Places
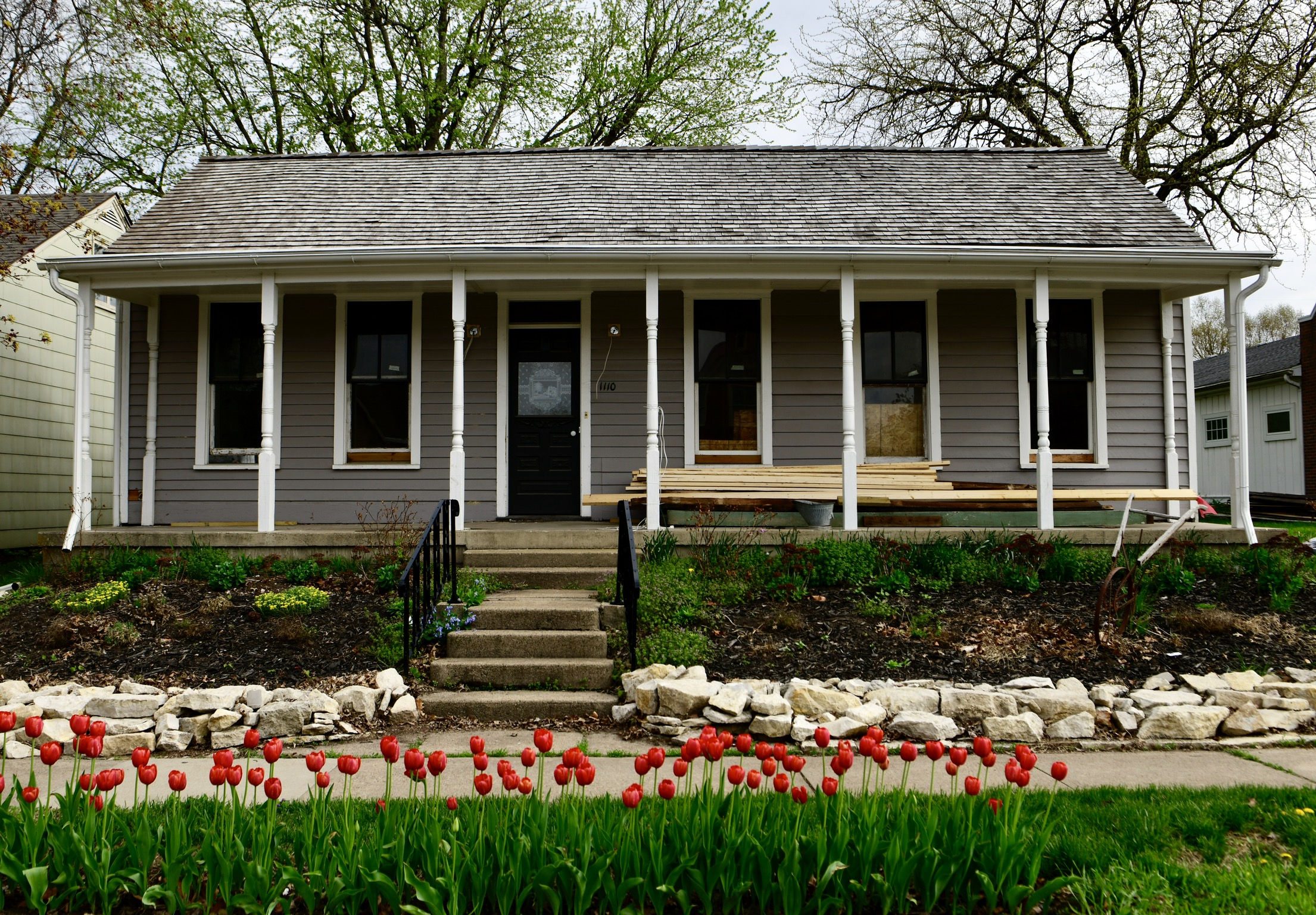

- Location within Iowa Location within the United States
- Location: 1110 W. Washington St. Pella, Iowa
- Coordinates: 41°24′30″N 92°55′29″W
- Area: less than one acre
- Built: 1857
- Architectural style: Mid 19th Century Revival
- NRHP reference No.: 08000685
- Added to NRHP: July 16, 2008

The ten Hagen Cottage–Stegeman Store, is a historic building located in Pella, Iowa, United States. A.J.C. and Charlotte ten Hagen were first generation immigrants from the Netherlands.

== Background ==
The ten Hagen's received the title to this property, and the single-story frame cottage was built on it before A.J.C. died the following year. Charlotte inherited the property and was its owner until she sold it in 1876 to G.F. Stegeman who enlarged it and converted it into a general store. The building is located in what is known as Strawtown, the original business district in Pella. The building features heavy wood-frame construction, a six-bay, asymmetrical facade, side-gabled roof, a full-width front porch, and Dutch building techniques. The building techniques include a floor system where the flooring rests on top of the floor joists without the use of a subfloor, and window design that maximizes the amount of light into the structure. The building was listed on the National Register of Historic Places in 2008.
