= Pella Opera House =

- U.S. National Register of Historic Places
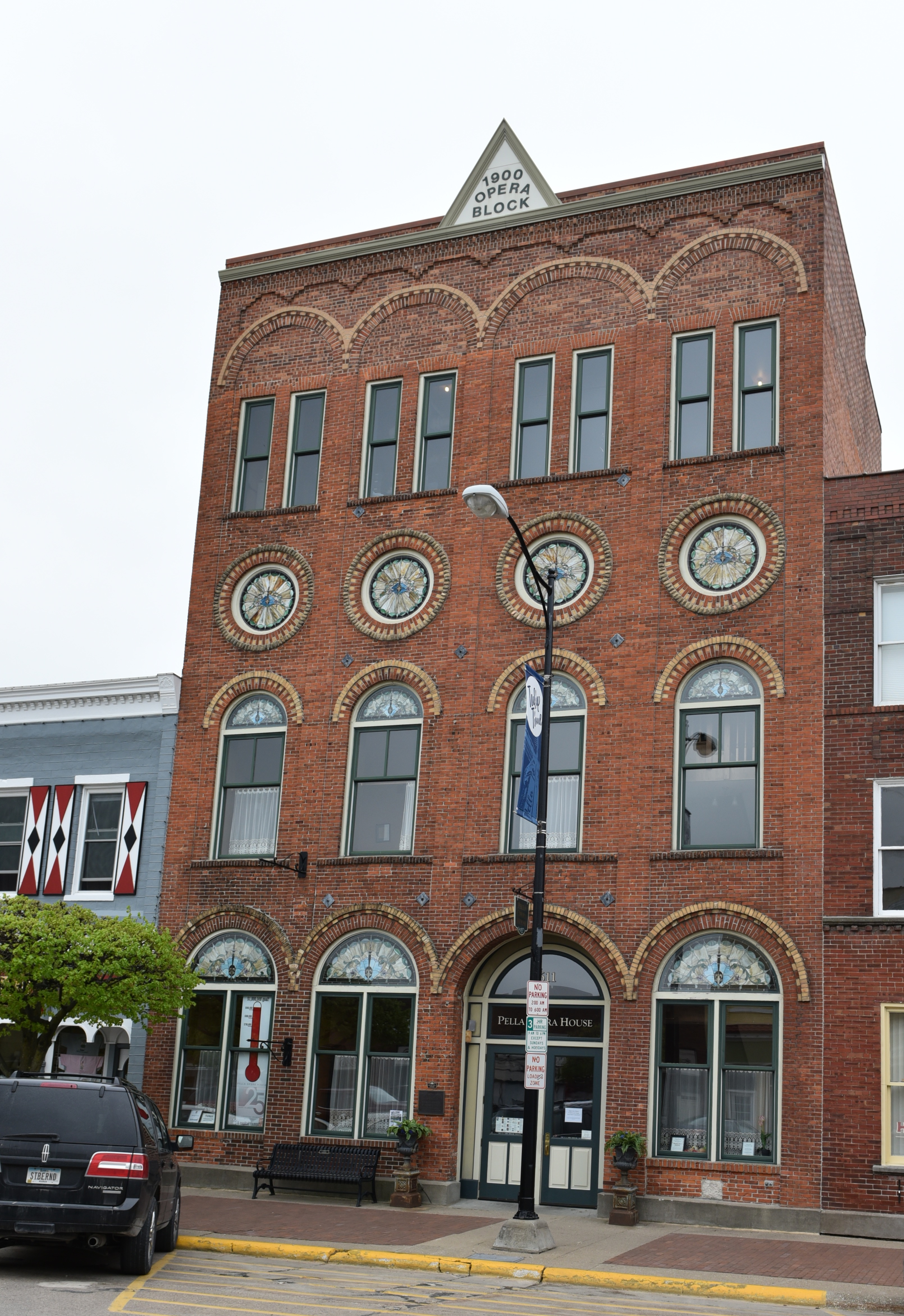

- Location within Iowa Location within the United States
- Location: 611 Franklin St. Pella, Iowa
- Coordinates: 41°24′23″N 92°54′55″W
- Area: Less than one acre
- Built: 1900
- Architect: Henry DeGooyer
- Architectural style: Romanesque Revival
- NRHP reference No.: 91001080
- Added to NRHP: March 20, 1992

The Pella Opera House is a historic building located in Pella, Iowa, United States. Herman Rietveld, a local businessman and promoter, was the main backer for building the opera house, which was underwritten by the Pella Opera House Association. A previous opera house had been destroyed in a fire in the late 19th century. Pella architect Henry DeGooyer designed the four story, brick Romanesque Revival structure. He used the opera house in Sioux City, Iowa, as his guide. The locally produced orange-colored bricks are said to be distinctive to Pella.

The opera house opened in November 1900 and regularly served its intended purpose for only a few years. After that it sporadically hosted stage performances until 1918. The building was converted into a commercial building at that time. It continued to serve that purpose until the 1980s when the Pella Opera House Commission acquired the property and converted back into a live entertainment venue. A Des Moines architect, Lawrence M. Erickson, was architect for the rehabilitation project, completed in 1990. The building was listed on the National Register of Historic Places in 1992.
