= Thomas F. and Nancy Tuttle House =

Historic house in Iowa, United States

- U.S. National Register of Historic Places
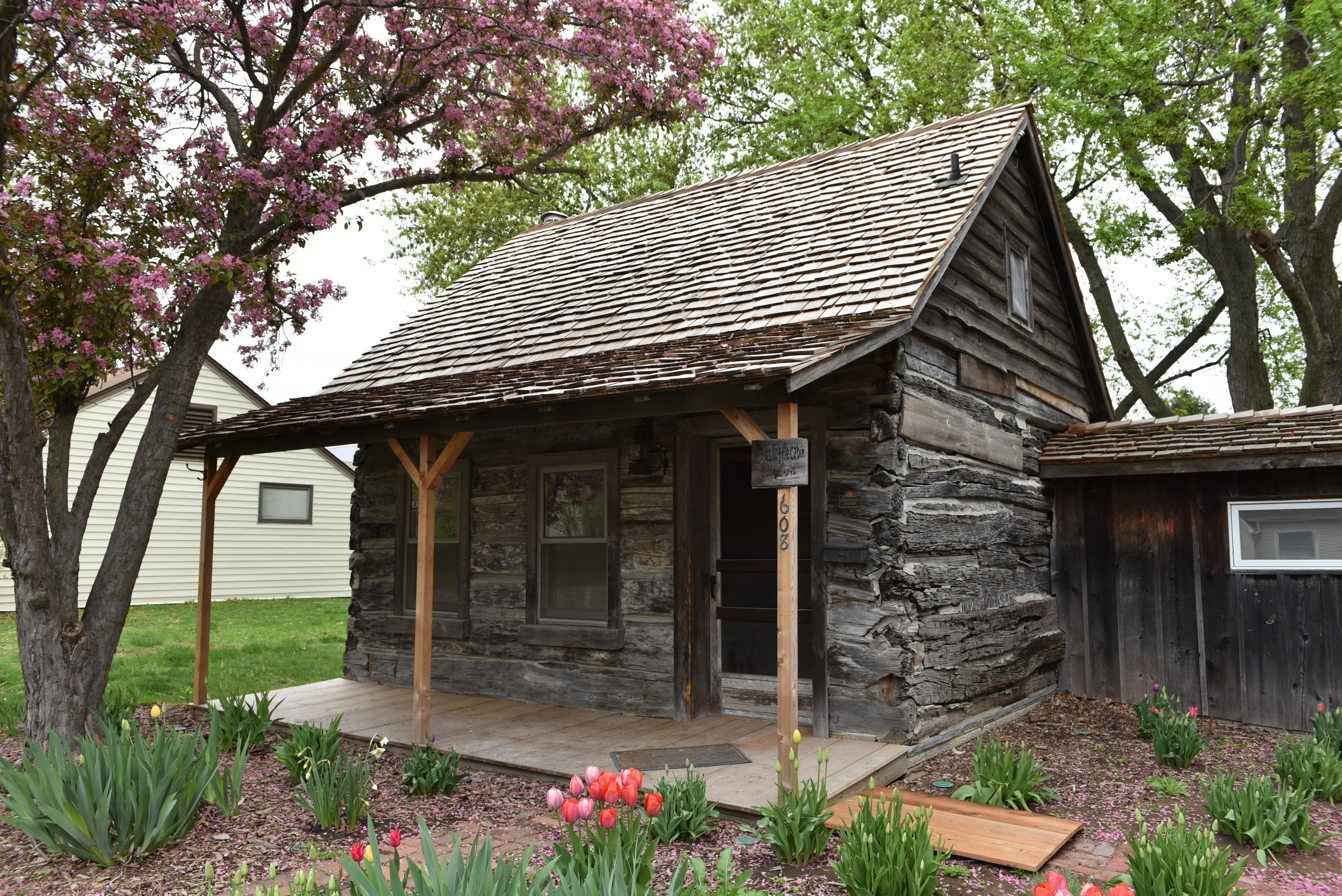

- Location within Iowa Location within the United States
- Location: 608 Lincoln St. Pella, Iowa
- Coordinates: 41°24′39″N 92°54′56.5″W
- Area: less than one acre
- Built: 1843
- NRHP reference No.: 14001209
- Added to NRHP: January 27, 2015

The Thomas F. and Nancy Tuttle House, also known as the Tuttle Cabin, is a historic residence located in Pella, Iowa, United States. Built in 1843, it predates the founding of the Pella, and is therefore the oldest building in town. The 1½-story log cabin contains a single room, and was built as a farmhouse for a homestead claim by Thomas Tuttle. In 1847 Pella's founder, Dominie Henry P. Scholte, bought the dwelling and farm from Tuttle for the location of the settlement for Dutch immigrants. Scholte sold the cabin in 1866. The last family to live here was the Sneller family who lived here from 1912 to 1973. Robert Van Vark bought the cabin at an auction in 1973 and his daughter, Gail Van Vark Kirby, inherited it from him. The house was listed on the National Register of Historic Places in 2015. Pella Preservation Trust acquired the property in April of the same year.
