= First Christian Church (Pella, Iowa) =

- U.S. National Register of Historic Places
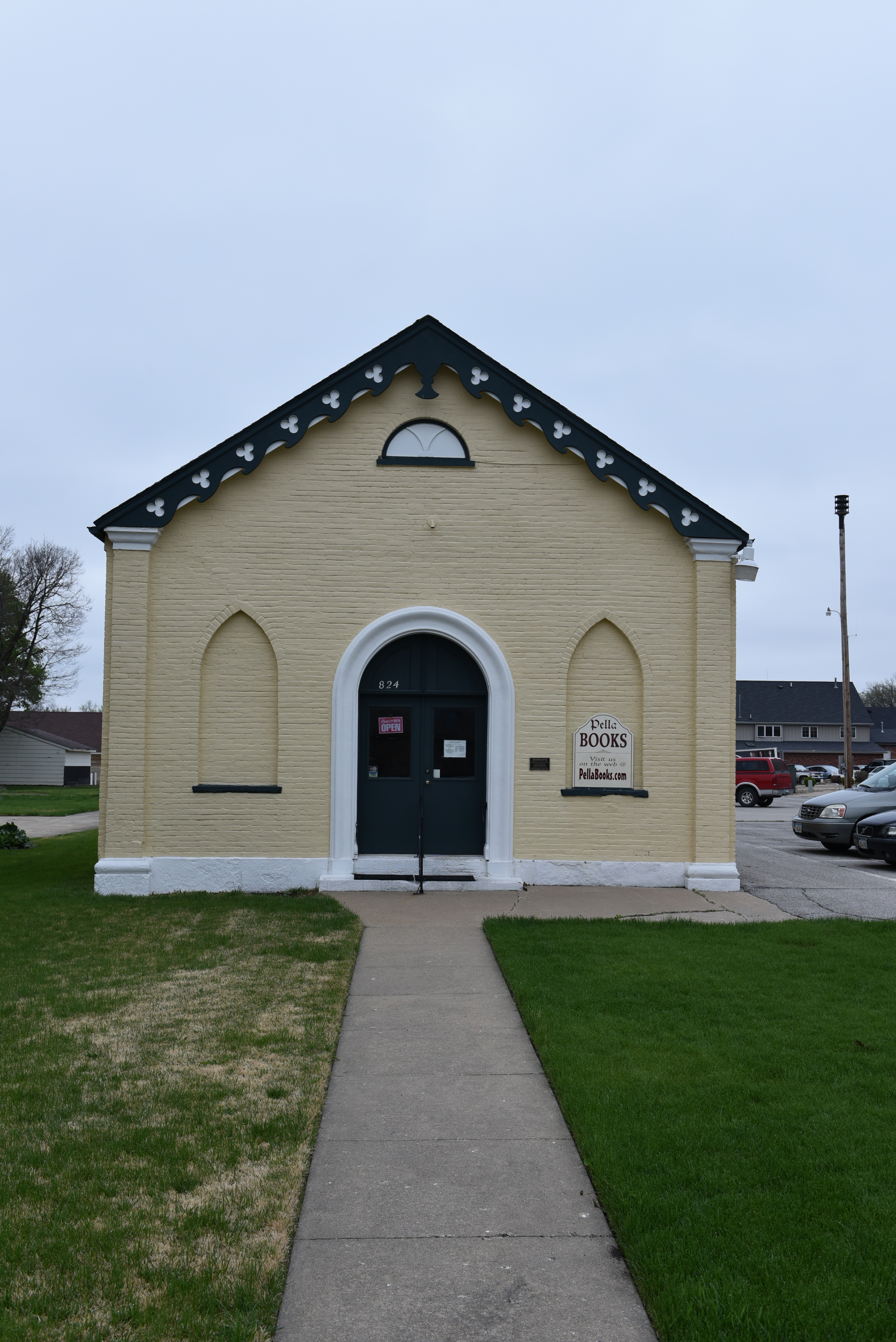

- Location within Iowa Location within the United States
- Location: 824 Franklin St. Pella, Iowa
- Coordinates: 41°24′26″N 92°55′9″W
- Area: less than one acre
- Built: c. 1860
- Architectural style: Gothic Revival
- NRHP reference No.: 07000206
- Added to NRHP: March 29, 2007

First Christian Church (also known as Maasdam's Christian Church) is a historic church at 824 Franklin Street in Pella, Iowa.

It is a small, one-story brick church, was built between 1858 and 1862. As of 1869, it was named the Soul Sleepers Church. During the 1880s it held the Pella Y.M.C.A. As of 2022 it is the site of an independent bookstore, Pella Books.

Its significance includes that, according to its NRHP nomination:

"...it calls attention to religion and social history among the Pella Dutch. During the 19th century, attempts to unite the various stripes of Dutch Protestantism in the United States, evolving since the 17th century, failed and resulted in schism and the formation of two separate denominations. This national schism exacerbated a religious volatility already simmering in Pella. First Christian Church calls attention to this strife within the otherwise homogeneous Dutch-American community, as religion became the focus of local controversy during the 1850s and 1860s. These controversies centered on Domine Henry P. Scholte, the pastor of the original flock of Dutch Reformed settlers in Pella, and divergent forms of worship then emerging among some of the settlers. Elder Jacob Maasdam, a charismatic layman, led one of these latter groups. His adherents built the First Christian Church, where they worshipped until circa 1869, splitting Scholte's flock, which built another church.

It was added to the National Register of Historic Places in 2007.
