= Pella Dutch =

Dutch dialect spoken in Pella, Iowa, USA

- Pella Nederlands
- Native to: Pella, Iowa, United States
- Native speakers: some
- Language family: Indo-European: Germanic; West Germanic; Istvaeonic; Low Franconian; Dutch; Brabantic; Pella Dutch

Language codes
- ISO 639-3: –
- Glottolog: None
- Location of Pella, Iowa
- Coordinates: 41°24′N 92°55′W

Pella Dutch, also known as Iowa Dutch, is a dialect of the Dutch language spoken in Pella, Iowa.

Pella Dutch's origins began with the migration of a group of 800 Dutch settlers under the leadership of Dominee (Reverend) H. P. Scholte in 1847.

In 1860, the Pella Weekblad, Pella's first Dutch language newspaper, debuted. The paper continued to be published weekly until 1941.

Language use was strongly affected by Governor William L. Harding's controversial 1918 Babel Proclamation, which banned the speaking of languages other than English in public.

Semi-speakers of the dialect have been attested as recently as 2011.
