= Hendrik J. and Wilhelmina H. Van Den Berg Cottage =

Historic house in Iowa, United States

- U.S. National Register of Historic Places
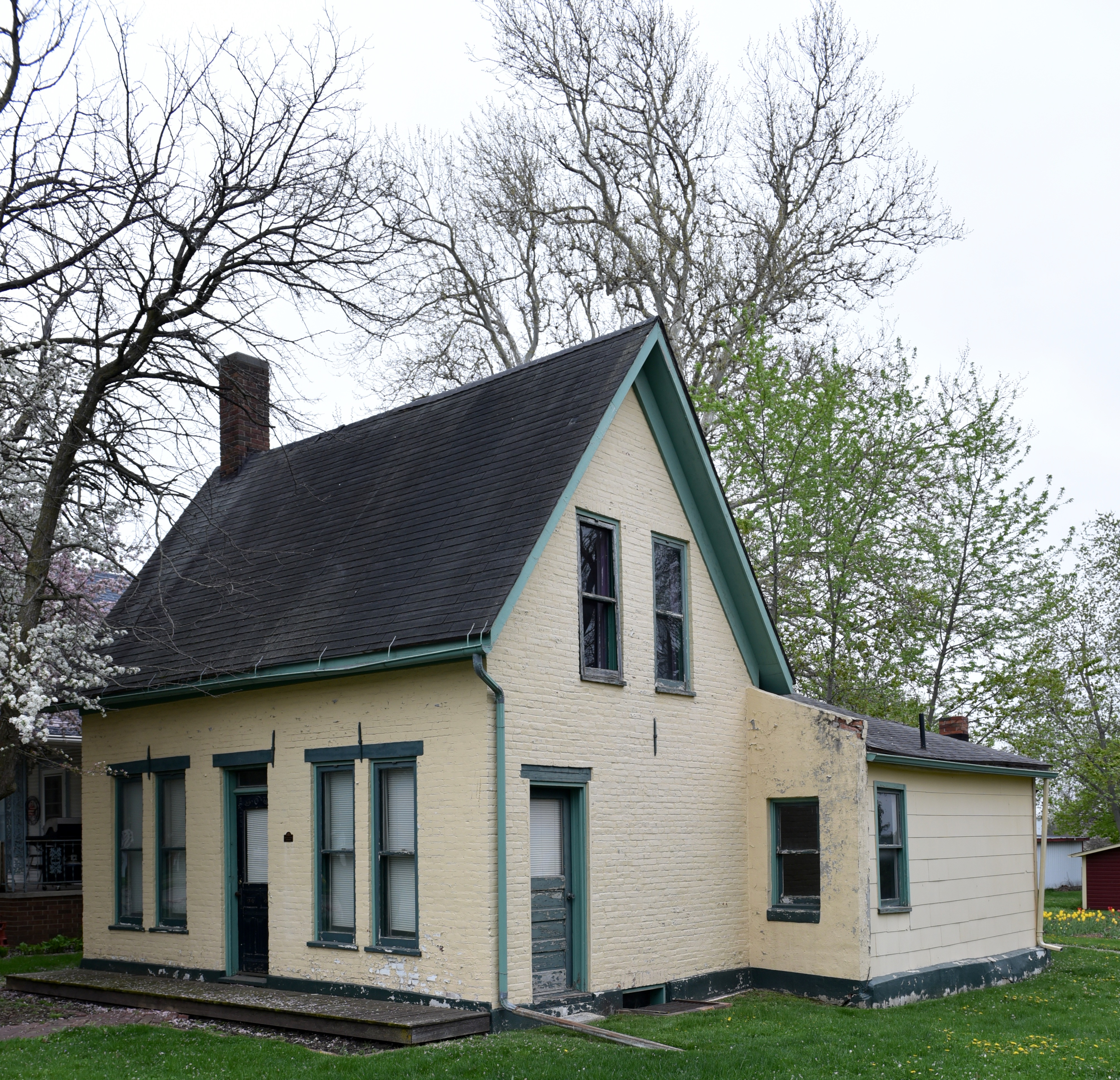

- Location within Iowa Location within the United States
- Location: 1305 W. Washington St. Pella, Iowa
- Coordinates: 41°24′4″N 92°55′42″W
- Built: 1862, 1880
- NRHP reference No.: 03000835
- Added to NRHP: August 28, 2003

The Hendrik J. and Wilhelmina H. Van Den Berg Cottage is an historic building located in Pella, Iowa, United States. During the 1840s and the 1850s immigrants moved to Iowa from the Netherlands to escape religious persecution. Hendrik J. Van den Berg was one such person. He built this home in two phases, 1862 and 1880. It exemplifies the first generation of houses built in Pella and exhibits architectural influences of the Netherlands. It is one of only a few such structures that still remain in the town. The house was listed on the National Register of Historic Places in 2003.
