= Gary T. DiCamillo =

American businessman

- Born: c. 1952
- Education: Rensselaer Polytechnic Institute; Harvard Business School
- Occupation: Business executive

Gary T. DiCamillo (born c. 1952) is an American businessman. He is the former chairman and chief executive officer of the Polaroid Corporation.

== Early life ==
Gary T. DiCamillo was born circa 1952. He graduated from the Rensselaer Polytechnic Institute, where he earned a bachelor of science in chemical engineering in 1973. He earned a master in business administration from the Harvard Business School in 1975.

== Career ==
DiCamillo began his career at Procter & Gamble. He later worked for McKinsey & Company, followed by Black & Decker. He served as the chairman and chief executive officer of the Polaroid Corporation from 1995 to 2001.

DiCamillo is a partner at Eaglepoint Advisors. He is also an adjunct lecturer at Babson College. He serves on the boards of directors of the Whirlpool Corporation and Pella.
