= Dominie Henry P. Scholte House =

Historic house in Iowa, United States

- U.S. National Register of Historic Places
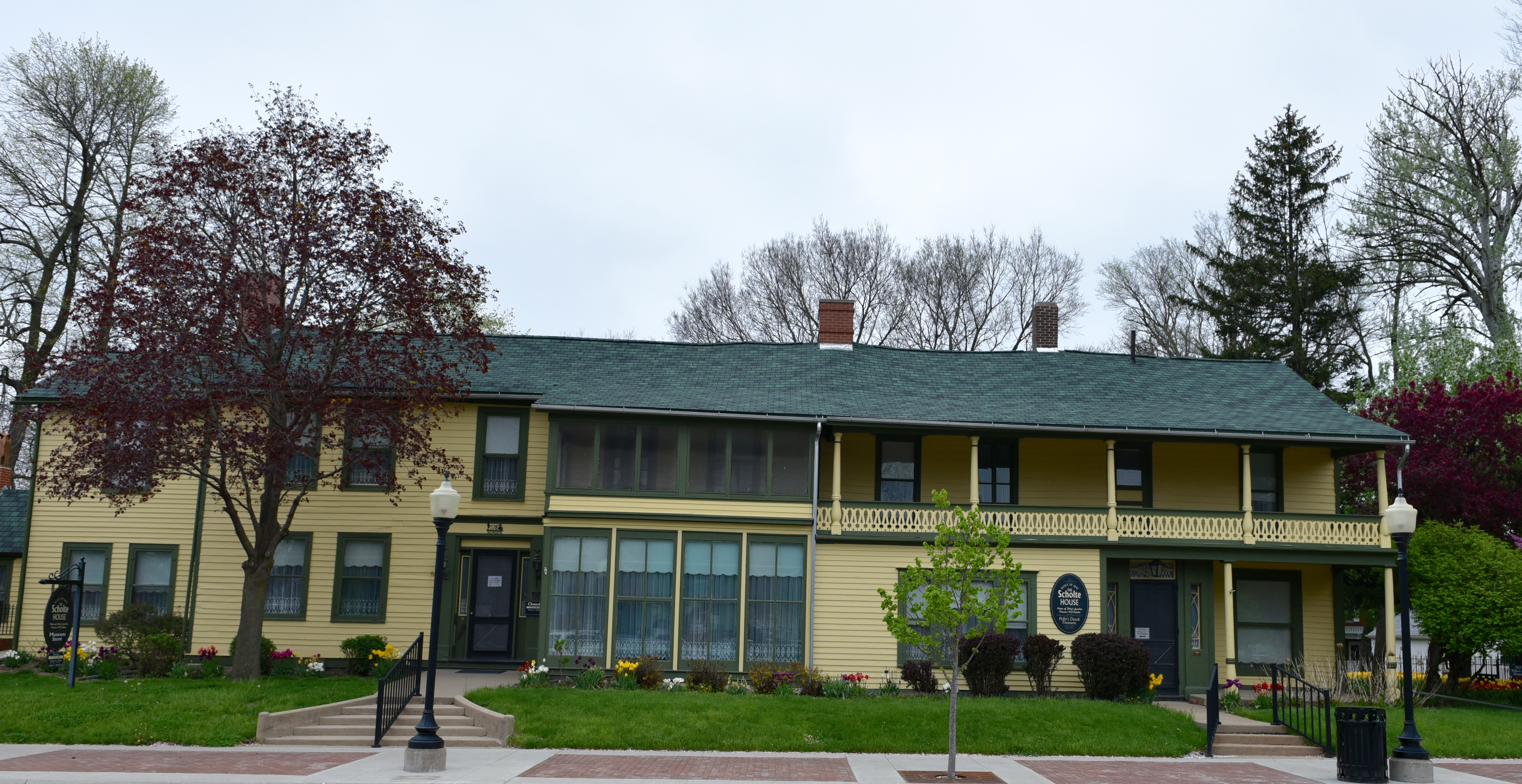

- Location within Iowa Location within the United States
- Location: 739 Washington St. Pella, Iowa
- Coordinates: 41°24′30″N 92°55′04″W
- Area: less than one acre
- Built: 1848
- Built by: H.P. Scholte
- Architectural style: Greek Revival
- NRHP reference No.: 82000415
- Added to NRHP: December 10, 1982

The Dominie Henry P. Scholte House is an historic residence located in Pella, Iowa, United States. Dominie Scholte was the leader of a secessionist movement from the organized church in the Netherlands in the 1830s. He became the spiritual, practical and formal leader of the Dutch Emigration Society, which prepared and executed the immigration of several hundred Dutch people to Pella in 1847. He is credited with founding the town itself, and was heavily involved in the town's early economic development. Initially a Democrat, he switched to the new Republican party and gave a speech on behalf of Abraham Lincoln at the 1860 Republican National Convention. Switching political parties and his involvement in church schism issues diminished his influence. He died in 1868. R.R. Beard, who married his widow, carried on Scholte's economic leadership in the community.

The first part of the house was built from 1847 to 1848, making it one the first buildings constructed in town. Its use of the Greek Revival style shows that the early Dutch immigrants used American styles and local materials. The easternmost section with the two-story porch is the original house. Two-story additions were made to the west, and the two-story addition off of the rear of the original house was completed in 1903. A single-story addition off that was added in 1980. The house was listed on the National Register of Historic Places in 1982. It is now the Scholte House Museum, operated by the Pella Historical Society.
