= East Amsterdam School =

- U.S. National Register of Historic Places
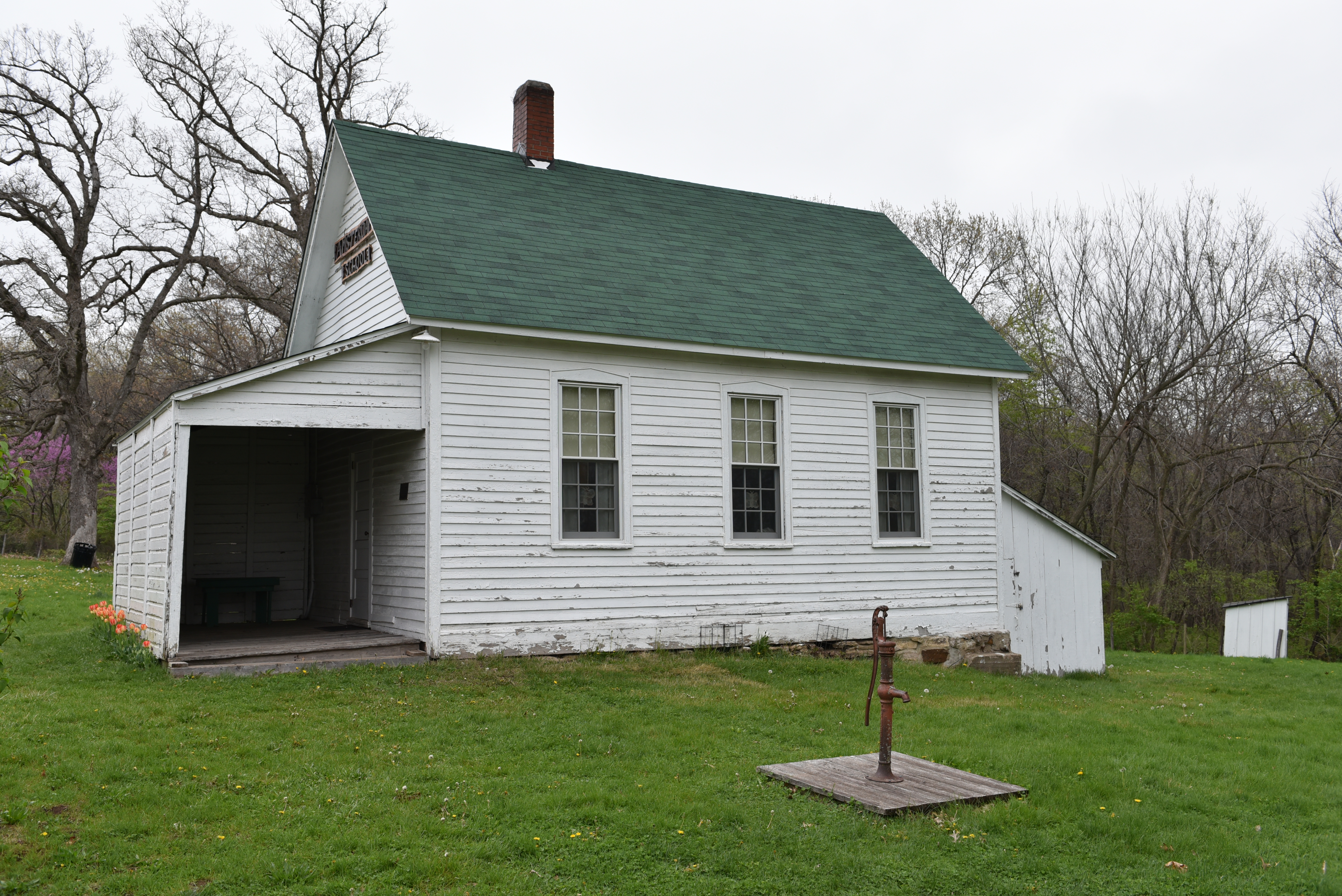
- The New Amsterdam schoolhouse

- Location within Iowa Location within the United States
- Location: 1010 198th Place
- Nearest city: Pella, Iowa
- Coordinates: 41°22′34″N 92°57′28″W
- Area: less than one acre
- Built: 1882
- Built by: Bootsma, Teunis & Co.
- Architectural style: Late Victorian
- NRHP reference No.: 00001471
- Added to NRHP: December 1, 2000

East Amsterdam School is a historic building located in the ghost town of New Amsterdam, which is located to the southwest of Pella, Iowa, United States. The Wabash Railroad began construction of its line through this area in 1882. The route split the Independent School District of Amsterdam in two, and it required that its only school building be torn down. They decided to build two school buildings, East Amsterdam School and West Amsterdam School, so the districts children would not have to cross the tracks. The west building is no longer extant. The East Amsterdam School was in use from 1882 to 1960 when it was closed by the Pella Community School District, with which it had merged in 1958. It is now a museum operated by the Pella Historical Society. The building was listed on the National Register of Historic Places in 2000.

The single-story, one-room, frame structure was completed in 1882 by Bootsma, Teunis & Co. The open porch was added in 1905, and the lean-to was built around 1942. There are two privies that sit 70 feet (21 m) behind the school building. It is unknown when they were built, but they were extant when the school closed in 1960. They are not part of the historic designation.
