= William Van Asch House-Huibert Debooy Commercial Room =

Historic house in Iowa, United States

- William Van Asch House- Huibert Debooy Commercial Room
- U.S. National Register of Historic Places
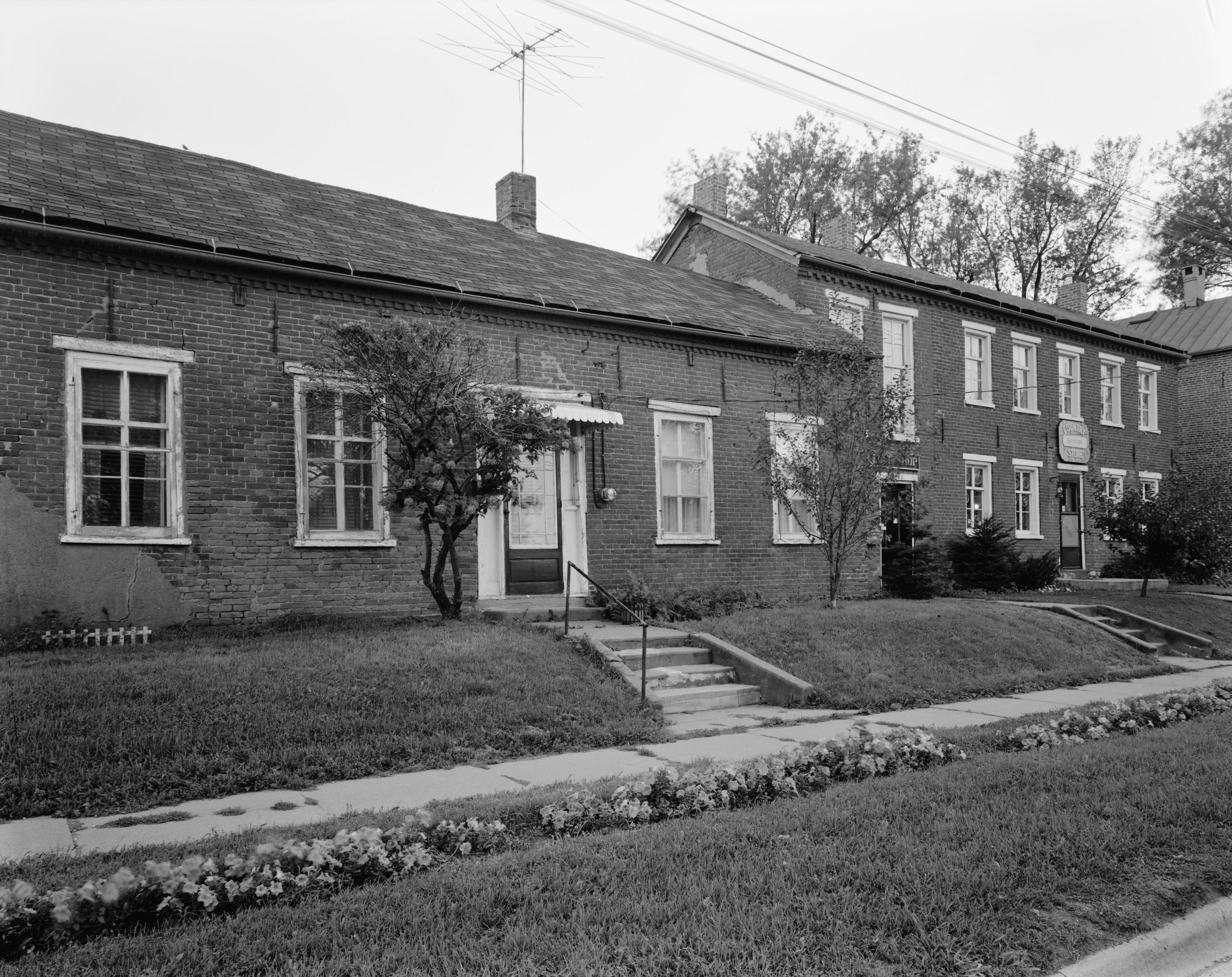

- Location within Iowa Location within the United States
- Location: 1105, 1107, and 1109 W. Washington St. Pella, Iowa
- Coordinates: 41°24′28.5″N 92°55′28″W
- Area: less than one acre
- NRHP reference No.: 87002056
- Added to NRHP: December 2, 1987

The William Van Asch House-Huibert Debooy Commercial Room, also known as the Central College Temporary Quarters, is a historic building located in Pella, Iowa, United States. It is one of the finest extant examples of vernacular architecture that the early Dutch settlers to Pella brought with them from the Netherlands. Both Van Asch and Debooy were among the earliest settlers in Pella. Van Asch had the two-story brick house built in 1854. Before he and his wife could move in, he rented the house to Central University of Iowa for its use. The college used it for two years. DeBooy built the 1½-story brick commercial room to the east in 1856. He bought the Van Asch's house in 1864 and joined the two buildings together with a hyphen. The DeBooys lived in the house. After they died in the early 20th century the entire complex housed apartments. The Strawtown Corporation bought it in 1974 and it now houses retail businesses.

Dutch building techniques were utilized in the construction of both buildings. They include the use of beam anchors, which are similar to tie rods, a floor system where the flooring rests on top of the floor joists without the use of a subfloor, the window sash configuration, the use of hyphens to join two separate buildings and increase floor space, and the mousetooth pattern brickwork. The house was listed on the National Register of Historic Places in 1987.
