= Pella Corporation =

American window and door manufacturer est. 1925

- Type: Private
- Industry: Windows and doors
- Founded: Des Moines, Iowa (1925)
- Founder: Pete and Lucille Kuyper
- Headquarters: Pella, Iowa, United States
- Key people: Emily Videtto, President & CEO
- Number of employees: 7,000 (2019)
- Website: www.pella.com

The Pella Corporation is a privately held window and door manufacturing company headquartered in Pella, Iowa, and with manufacturing and sales operations in a number of locations in the United States.

The company was founded in 1925 when Peter Kuyper and his wife Lucille invested $5,000 to buy the Rolscreen Company, a small business that had created the Rolscreen insect window screen that rolls out of sight when not in use. In 1926, they moved the company to Pella, Iowa, where the Kuyper family had a lumber business. The company developed into one of the largest window manufacturers in the United States. The company changed its name to Pella Corporation in 1992. Pella Corporation has around 10,000 employees nationwide and 20 manufacturing sites throughout the United States and select regions of Canada. Pella's most notable brand of windows includes the EnduraClad and EnduraGuard systems.

== Background ==
In 1992, Pella entered the national retail market with windows and patio doors, adding select lumberyard distribution in 1994. In 2001, Pella introduced Pella Design Centers to mainstream market customers, as a “store-within-a-store inside Lowe's stores and staffed by Lowe's employees.

In 2000, Fortune Magazine recognized Pella as one of the 100 Best Companies To Work For and Pella was awarded for six consecutive years. In 2018, Pella was awarded Forbes America's Best Large Employers of the Year.

Pella earned the U.S. Environmental Protection Agency (EPA) and Department of Energy‚ (DOE) Energy Star Sustained Excellence Award in 2009 and 2010. Pella Corporation earned an ENERGY STAR Partner of the Year 2013 award, presented by the U.S. Environmental Protection Agency (EPA) and the Department of Energy (DOE) for manufacturing energy-efficient windows and educating consumers about them.

Pella has been an Energy Star partner since 1999. Pella is a member of the United States Green Building Council (USGBC), the American Architectural Manufacturers Association (AAMA) and the Window and Door Manufacturers Association (WDMA).

== Charitable activities ==
The Kuyper Rolscreen Charitable Trust was established in 1952 by Pete and Lucille Kuyper. It was reorganized in 1968 as the Pella Rolscreen Foundation. The foundation's primary focus was supporting education, community betterment and giving. Matching Gifts was added in 1984; in 2002, they established a volunteer recognition program in honor of the foundation’s 50th anniversary.

Since 2003, Pella Corporation has partnered with JDRF, an organization fighting type 1 diabetes. The organization's two goals are to find a cure and support children and adults who are fighting this disease. In 2017, Pella and its employees raised $2.7 million USD for the organization.
