= Knoxville WPA Athletic Field Historic District =

Historic district in Iowa, United States

- Knoxville WPA Athletic Field; Historic District
- U.S. National Register of Historic Places
- U.S. Historic district
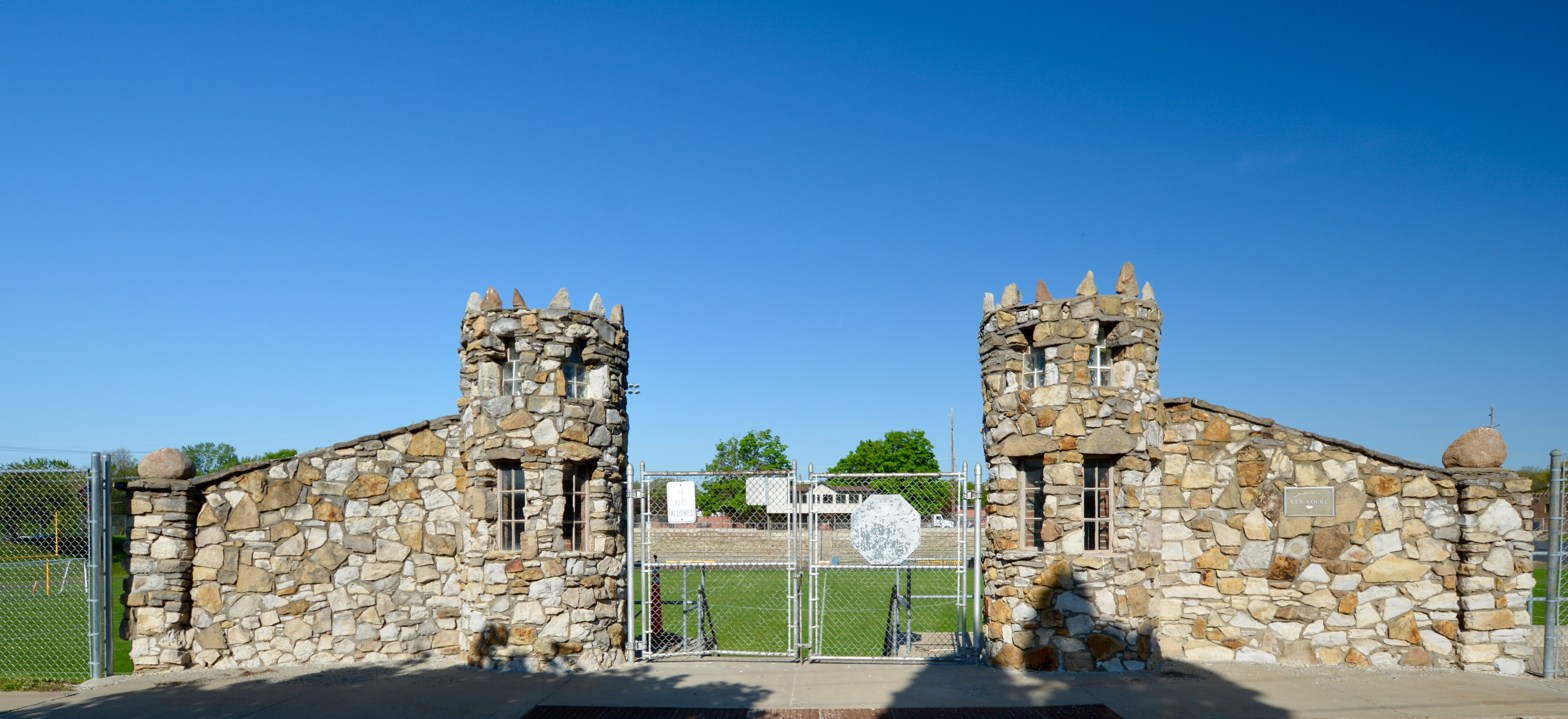
- One set of gateway structures

- Location within Iowa Location within the United States
- Location: Bounded by Lincoln St., Robinson St., Stadium St., and Marion St. Knoxville, Iowa
- Coordinates: 41°19′08″N 93°06′31″W
- Area: 4 acres (1.6 ha)
- Built by: Works Progress Administration
- NRHP reference No.: 07000775
- Added to NRHP: August 2, 2007

The Knoxville WPA Athletic Field Historic District is a nationally recognized historic district located in Knoxville, Iowa, United States. It was listed on the National Register of Historic Places in 2007. At the time of its nomination the district consisted of 14 resources, including three contributing buildings, seven contributing structures, one contributing site, two noncontributing buildings, and one noncontributing structure. The oldest structure in the district is the city-owned water tower that was completed in 1922 on what was the city reservoir. Two Works Progress Administration (WPA) projects were added in the 1930s.

== Former Swimming Pool ==
The first WPA project was a concrete swimming pool and brick bathhouse that were completed in 1938. The main pool and the wading pool were owned by the city and used until 1988 when a new facility opened in another location. The Knoxville Community School District took ownership at that time and filled the pools in and built a concession stand over the wading pool in 1990. The bathhouse and the former mothers' pavilion, where mothers could watch their children swim, remain in place.

== Ken Locke Stadium ==
The football stadium is the second WPA project. It was dedicated in 1939 and completed the following year. The stadium is located in the drained reservoir. It is composed of a grass playing field surrounded by a cinder track, two gateway structures with castellated stone towers that double as ticket booths, a stone storage building, sections of a stone retaining wall, and two sets of bleachers. The concession stand and press box were built in 1990, and are not considered historical. The same is true for the retaining wall at the north end of the field, which replaced the original stone wall in the mid-1960s.

On the evening of October 16, 1964, Kenneth John Locke, a football player for the Knoxville Panthers, collapsed on the field due to a blood clot in his brain. He was transported to Mercy Hospital in Des Moines, Iowa and died on October 21, 1964. The stadium was renamed in his honor in 1964 and bears his name to this day.

In 2006, the Knoxville Alumni Association launched the "Save Our Stadium" (SOS) committee with the goal of raising $1 million to repair various parts of the stadium, with a focus on restoring the original stone seating. Restoration occurred over a four-year period from 2007 to 2010.
