= Veterans Administration Medical Center (Grant County, Indiana) =

Coordinates: 40°31′12″N 85°38′15″W

The Veterans Administration Medical Center was a sanatorium in Center Township, Grant County, Indiana dedicated to the treatment of U.S. military personnel inflicted with mental illness.

Approved for construction in 1888 as a National Asylum for disabled soldiers and sailors of the Civil War, the center served veterans of several conflicts and was known by various names over its century-long operation: Marion Branch, National Home for Disabled Volunteer Soldiers (1888–1921), changed to Marion National Sanitorium (1921–1930) to accommodate neuropsychiatric care, and finally Veterans Administration Medical Center from July 1930 on, as the result of the consolidation of various Federal agencies handling veterans’ affairs.
