= DiCamillo Bakery =

American family-run bakery chain

- Industry: Bakery
- Founded: 1920; 106 years ago
- Founder: Tomaso and Addolorata DiCamillo
- Headquarters: Niagara Falls, New York
- Number of locations: 5 (2017)
- Areas served: New York State (local area distribution); United States (mail order)
- Products: Biscotti, cookies, breads, cakes
- Website: dicamillobakery.com

DiCamillo Bakery is an Italian American family-run bakery chain founded in 1920 in Niagara Falls, New York. It has locations in Niagara Falls, Williamsville, and Lewiston. It is known mainly for its biscotti.

== History ==
The DiCamillo Bakery was founded by Tomaso and Addolorata DiCamillo in 1920 on 14th Street. They were joined in business by their 11 children.

DiCamillo’s was one of the first Italian bakeries to open in Niagara Falls. It operated in the basement of a three-story building, delivering bread to locals by horse-drawn wagons. In 1931, the bakery was bombed and was the subject of an armed attack after the eldest son Tom refused to pay protection money to the mob collector.

=== Second generation, 1940s–1970s ===
Tomaso DiCamillo died in 1941, leaving the family business in the hands of his four sons. In 1942, they moved the bakery from 14th Street to 20th Street where the bakery operated until 1976.

By 1954, the company had three stores in Niagara Falls and offered a variety of traditional pastries.

=== Third generation, 1970s–1990s ===
In the late 1960s, a third generation of DiCamillo family entered the business. David, Thomas, Francis, and Michael DiCamillo opened a new production facility in 1976. In 1979, the company started to deliver products in tin boxes by mail orders. It opened a gourmet department headed by Michael DiCamillo and catered to gourmet departments at Saks Fifth Avenue, Macy's, Bloomingdale's in New York and Marshall Field's in Chicago. In 1980, DiCamillo also opened their first store outside of Niagara Falls in Lewiston at the historic Hotchkiss building. The bakery maintained its business model, Michael DiCamillo saying, "There are no brokers, no distributors, no agents. Everyone has to buy directly from us. There are no salesmen, no one else but us, which is an oddity in this business."

DiCamillo’s most popular product in the 1980s was biscotti, especially Biscotti Di Vino (red wine biscuits topped with sesame seeds) introduced in 1979 and sold in a brown coffee-style bag. In 1990, the name "Biscotti Di Vino" was registered as a trademark. Another popular product of the 1980s was traditional focaccia introduced in 1983.

The DiCamillo family were featured on the cover of Allison and Margaret Engel’s 1984 book Food Finds: America's Best Local Foods and the People Who Produce Them. The authors praised the Biscotti Di Vino, stating that it "has a taste, crunch, and flavor that is unequal." In 1989, an article by Margaret Engel in The Washington Post said of DiCamillo’s "Dolcetti Delicati" tin "as with all of the DiCamillo products, the presentation, from the magical graphics on the burnished gold tin to the neatly arranged cookies, equals the quality of the baked goods."

=== Fourth generation ===
In 2002, the bakery was operated by four brothers, each overseeing a particular business area: production, finance, marketing, and retail operations. DiCamillo added new varieties of cookies and sweets which were sold at retailers including Neiman Marcus and Bergdorf Goodman.

In 2006, the bakery opened its fifth retail store in Williamsville at a historic 1840 Greek Revival building.
