= Evan F. Ellis Farmhouse =

Historic house in Iowa, United States

- U.S. National Register of Historic Places
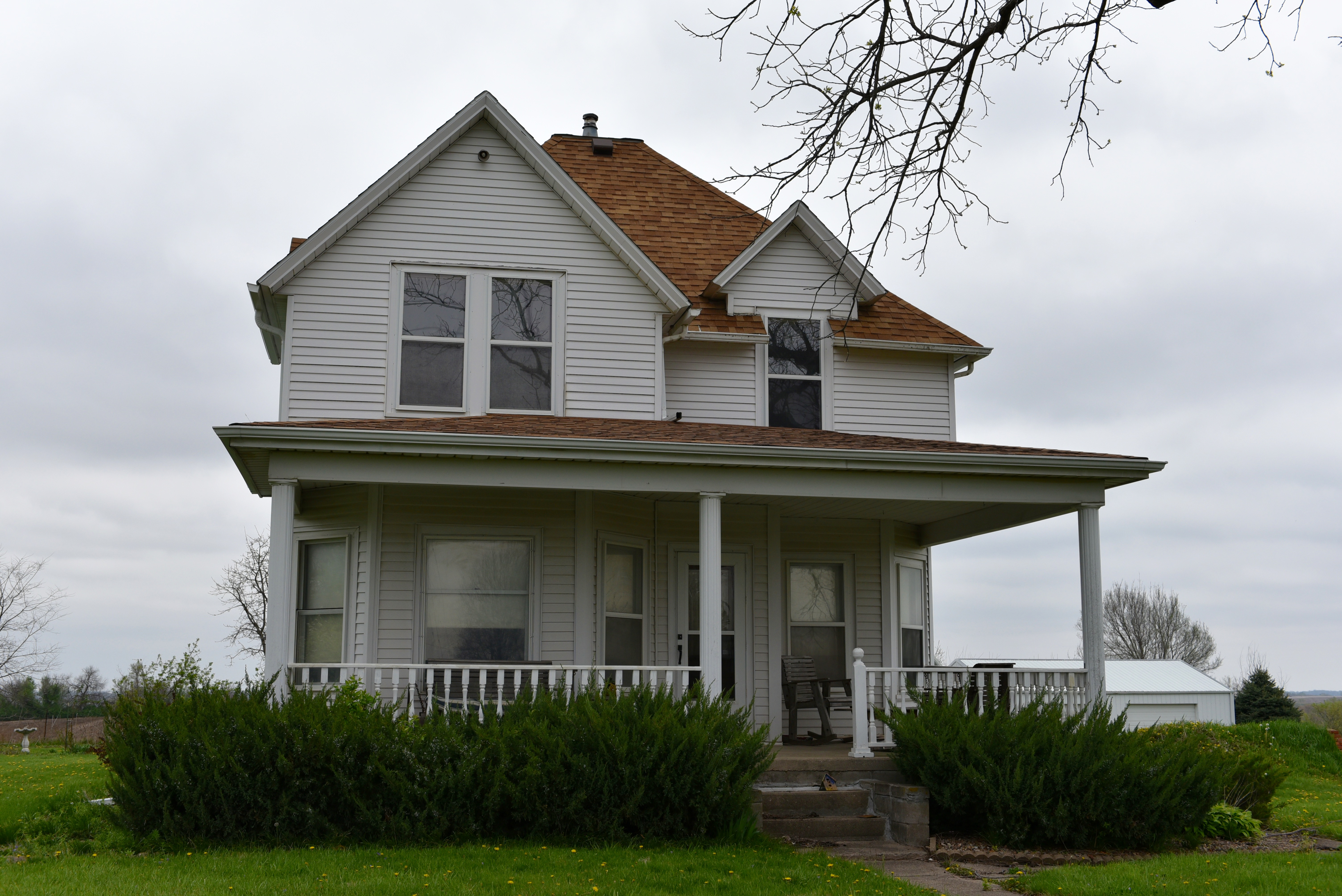

- Location within Iowa Location within the United States
- Location: Junction of Story and West Sts.
- Nearest city: Bussey, Iowa
- Coordinates: 41°13′10″N 92°53′21″W
- Area: less than one acre
- Built: 1913
- Built by: Evan F. Ellis
- NRHP reference No.: 85000006
- Added to NRHP: January 3, 1985

The Evan F. Ellis Farmhouse is an historic residence located north of Bussey, Iowa, United States. Evan, his wife Bertha, and their two daughters moved from Illinois and settled on the 120-acre (49 ha) farm they bought in Marion County, Iowa in 1909. He built this Sears, Roebuck & Co. "Honor Bilt Modern Homes" pre-cut house in 1913. It was unusual for such a house to be built in a rural area because all the parts would have to be transported a longer distance. The two-story frame house features a full-length front porch, projecting wall dormers, and it is capped with a hipped roof. After Evan's (1949) and Bertha's (1959) deaths, their daughter Mary continued to live in the house and run the farm until her death in 1974. While the family continued to own the farm, the house was rented to tenants until 1983 when Bonnie Vanderlinden Noah, Evan and Bertha's granddaughter, and her husband Jack began restoring the house for them to live in. The house was listed on the National Register of Historic Places in 1985.
