= Sons of Veterans =

Sons of Veterans was a general term used in the United States at the turn of the 20th century for fraternal organizations of men whose fathers fought in the United States Civil War.

It may refer to:

- Sons of Confederate Veterans
- Sons of Union Veterans of the Civil War
