= Knoxville Veterans Administration Hospital Historic District =

Historic district in Iowa, United States

- U.S. National Register of Historic Places
- U.S. Historic district
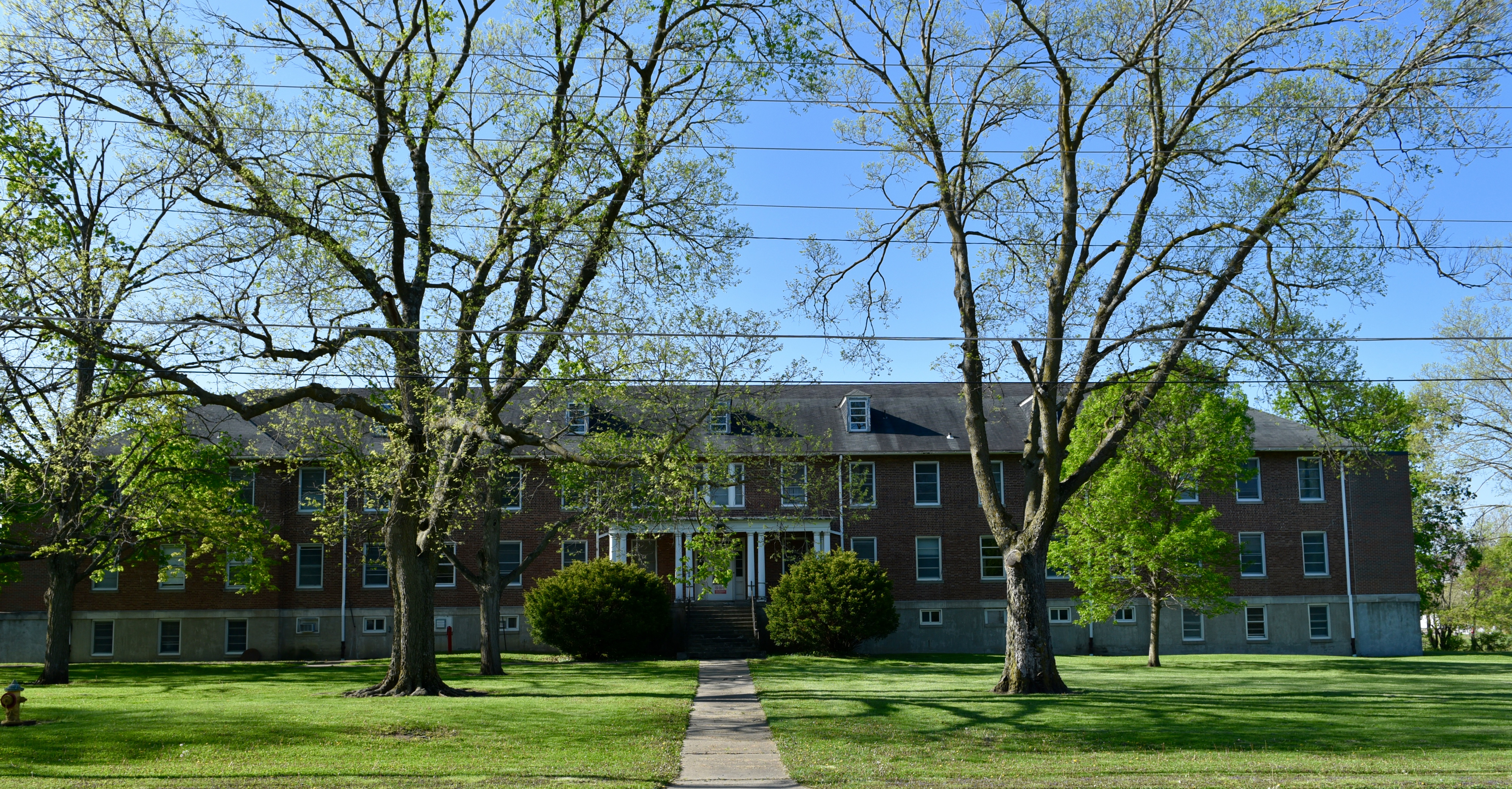

- Location within Iowa Location within the United States
- Location: 1515 W. Pleasant St. Knoxville, Iowa
- Coordinates: 41°19′20″N 93°06′51″W
- Architect: Henry F. Liebbe
- Architectural style: Classical Revival
- MPS: United States Second Generation Veterans Hospitals MPS
- NRHP reference No.: 12000246
- Added to NRHP: May 1, 2012

Knoxville Veterans Administration Hospital Historic District is a nationally recognized historic district located in Knoxville, Iowa, United States. It was listed on the National Register of Historic Places in 2012. The first part of the property that was developed is a cemetery, which is located in the middle of the former VA golf course. It contains 40 plots. The State Industrial Home for the Blind was opened on the site of what would become the Veterans Administration Hospital on January 1, 1892. It remained in operation until April 30, 1900, when the last patient moved out. Two years later the facility was transformed into the State Hospital for Inebriates, which was a place of detention and treatment for males addicted to morphine, cocaine and other narcotics. Local citizens protested, and it was closed a few years later.

The buildings sat empty until 1920 when they became a temporary hospital for disabled military veterans. There were initially 125 patients in a facility that had a bed capacity of 171. The US Government bought the property two years later for $200,000. The 345-acre (140 ha) site contained five brick structures, a greenhouse, and several frame buildings. The city of Knoxville advocated for a permanent hospital facility on the site, which it secured the following year. Buildings 1-5, 8-9, the warehouse, engineering shops, power plant, four resident quarters, three garages, the VA flag pole and a modern dairy barn were built in 1923. Buildings 101 and 102 were the last patient buildings to be constructed in 1944. The bed capacity increased to 1,631. The fire station, laundry facility and education building were renovated in 1996. Later that year it was announced that the Des Moines and Knoxville VA Medical Centers were to be integrated, and they became known collectively as VA Central Iowa Healthcare System in 1997. Secretary of Veterans Affairs Anthony J. Principi announced on January 7, 2005 that the Knoxville facility would close. The last Knoxville patients were moved to the new extended care building in Des Moines on December 18, 2009.

By February 2019 the city was negotiating to purchase the campus.
