= Pella, Iowa =

- City
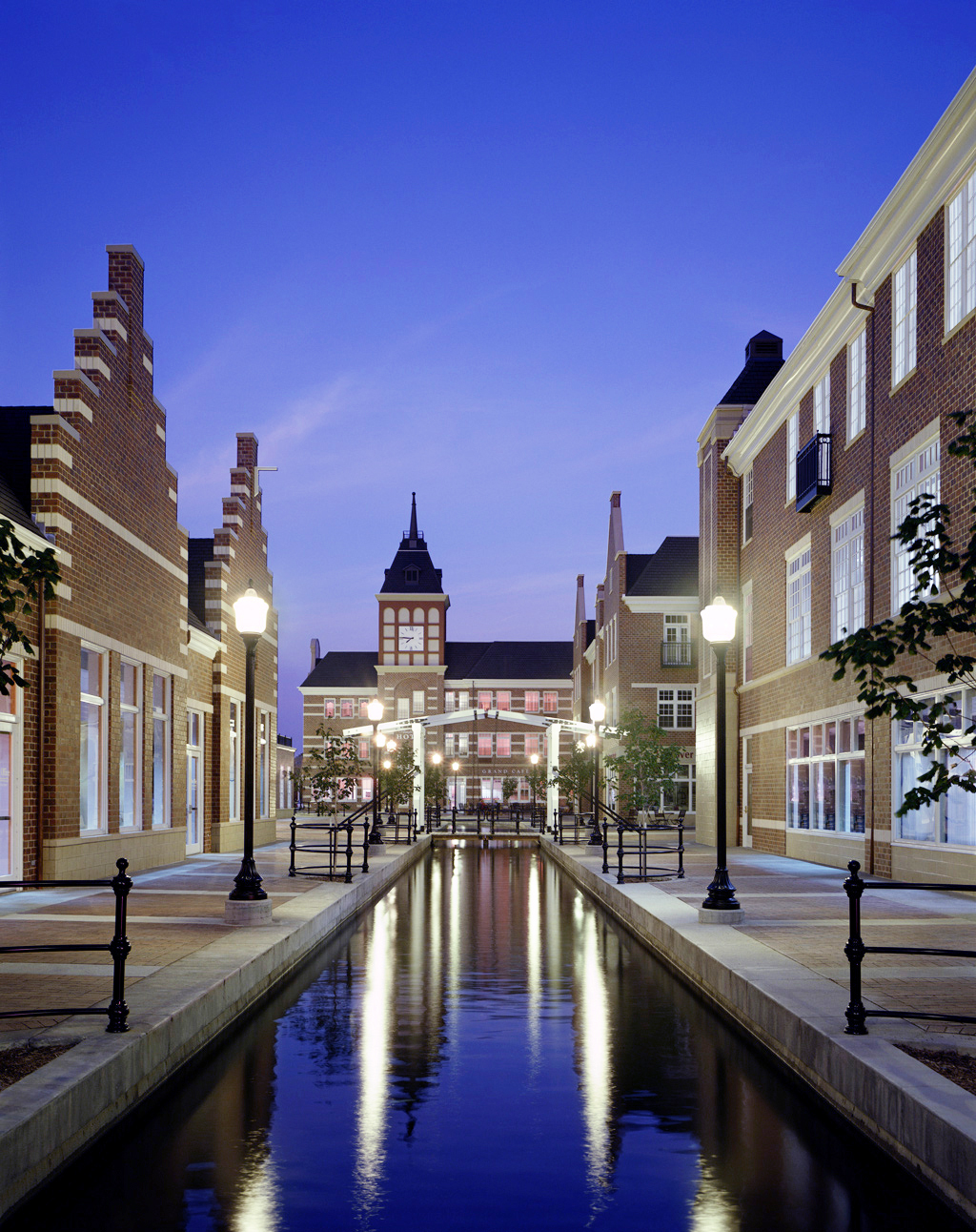
- Molengracht Canal, Downtown Pella
- Motto: "A Touch of Holland"
- Location of Pella, Iowa

- Location in the United States
- Coordinates: 41°24′17″N 92°53′40″W
- Country: United States
- State: Iowa
- County: Marion

Area
  - Total: 9.19 sq mi (23.79 km^{2})
  - Land: 9.18 sq mi (23.78 km^{2})
  - Water: 0 sq mi (0.00 km^{2})
- Elevation: 876 ft (267 m)

Population (2020)
  - Total: 10,464
  - Density: 1,139.6/sq mi (439.99/km^{2})
- Time zone: UTC-6 (Central (CST))
  - Summer (DST): UTC-5 (CDT)
- ZIP code: 50219
- Area code: 641
- FIPS code: 19-62040
- GNIS feature ID: 2396174
- Website: cityofpella.com

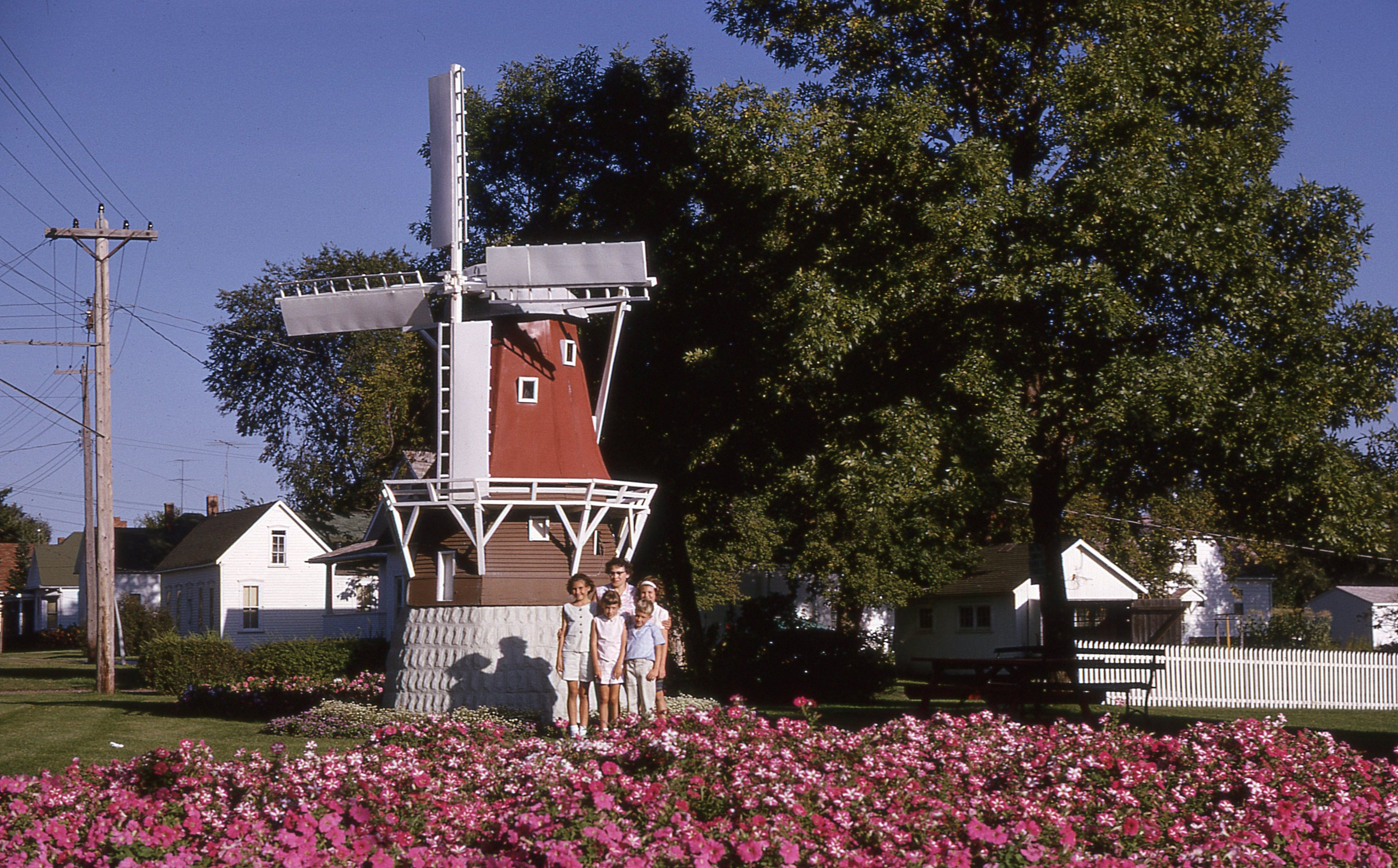
Brinkhoff Park, Pella

Pella is a city in Marion County, Iowa, United States, with a population of 10,464 at the time of the 2020 U.S. census. Founded by immigrants from the Netherlands, it is forty miles southeast of Des Moines. Pella is the home of Central College, as well as several manufacturing companies, including Pella Corporation and Vermeer Manufacturing Company.

== History ==
In 1847, 800 Dutch immigrants led by Dominee (Minister) Hendrik "Henry" P. Scholte settled the area known as Pella. The name "Pella" is a reference to Pella of the Decapolis, where the Christians of Jerusalem had found refuge during the Roman–Jewish war of 70; the name was selected because the Dominee and his followers sought religious freedom as well. The pioneer years are evoked in a biography of the Dominee's widow, Mareah Scholte, published by her granddaughter in 1939. Pella was the childhood home of Wyatt Earp, whose father Nicholas Porter Earp had settled on a farm near Pella. His brothers Warren and Morgan were born in Pella.

On July 19, 2018, a destructive EF3 tornado struck the Vermeer manufacturing plant in the city. Due to early warning, only seven of the thousands of people on-site were injured.

== Geography ==
According to the United States Census Bureau, the city has a total area of 8.73 square miles (22.61 km^{2}), all land. Since 2013, it has been located in Iowa's 2nd congressional district. Before that year, it was part of Iowa's 3rd congressional district.

== Demographics ==
Historical populations
Year	Pop.	±%
1860	1,644	—
1870	1,909	+16.1%
1880	2,430	+27.3%
1890	2,408	−0.9%
1900	2,623	+8.9%
1910	3,021	+15.2%
1920	3,338	+10.5%
1930	3,326	−0.4%
1940	3,638	+9.4%
1950	4,427	+21.7%
1960	5,198	+17.4%
1970	6,668	+28.3%
1980	8,349	+25.2%
1990	9,270	+11.0%
2000	9,832	+6.1%
2010	10,352	+5.3%
2020	10,464	+1.1%
Source:"U.S. Census website". United States Census Bureau. and Iowa Data Center; Source: U.S. Decennial Census

=== 2020 census ===
As of the 2020 census, Pella had a population of 10,464, with 3,981 households and 2,573 families. The population density was 1,139.6 inhabitants per square mile (440.0/km^{2}). There were 4,271 housing units at an average density of 465.1 per square mile (179.6/km^{2}).

96.9% of residents lived in urban areas, while 3.1% lived in rural areas.

Among households in Pella, 27.2% had children under the age of 18 living in them. Of all households, 55.6% were married-couple households, 3.5% were cohabiting-couple households, 16.0% were households with a male householder and no spouse or partner present, and 25.0% were households with a female householder and no spouse or partner present. In total, 35.4% of households were non-family households. About 31.9% of all households were made up of individuals and 15.2% had someone living alone who was 65 years of age or older.

Of housing units, 6.8% were vacant. The homeowner vacancy rate was 2.1% and the rental vacancy rate was 5.5%.

The median age was 37.4 years. 26.9% of residents were under the age of 20; 10.2% were between the ages of 20 and 24; 21.2% were from 25 to 44; 21.0% were from 45 to 64; and 20.7% were 65 years of age or older. 21.6% of residents were under the age of 18. For every 100 females there were 95.3 males, and for every 100 females age 18 and over there were 93.6 males age 18 and over.

Racial composition as of the 2020 census
Race	Number	Percent
White	9,546	91.2%
Black or African American	113	1.1%
American Indian and Alaska Native	16	0.2%
Asian	261	2.5%
Native Hawaiian and Other Pacific Islander	17	0.2%
Some other race	109	1.0%
Two or more races	402	3.8%
Hispanic or Latino (of any race)	278	2.7%

=== 2010 census ===
As of the census of 2010, 10,352 people, 3,735 households, and 2,500 families resided in the city. The population density was 1,185.8 inhabitants per square mile (457.8/km^{2}). The 4,086 housing units averaged 468.0 per square mile (180.7/km^{2}). The racial makeup of the city was 95.0% White, 0.7% African American, 0.2% Native American, 2.3% Asian, 0.3% from other races, and 1.4% from two or more races. Hispanics of any race were 1.7% of the population.

Of the 3,735 households, 30.0% had children under the age of 18 living with them, 58.6% were married couples living together, 6.5% had a female householder with no husband present, 1.9% had a male householder with no wife present, and 33.1% were not families. About 29.5% of all households were made up of individuals, and 13.4% had someone living alone who was 65 years of age or older. The average household size was 2.40 and the average family size was 2.96.

The median age in the city was 33.3 years. About 22.3% of residents were under the age of 18; 18.4% were between the ages of 18 and 24; 21.1% were from 25 to 44; 21.8% were from 45 to 64; and 16.4% were 65 years of age or older. The gender makeup of the city was 47.7% male and 52.3% female.

=== 2000 census ===
As of the census of 2000, 9,832 people, 3,497 households, and 2,395 families resided in the city. The population density was 1,437.4 inhabitants per square mile (555.0/km^{2}).

The median income for a household in the city was $45,496, and for a family was $56,321. Males had a median income of $40,344 versus $25,833 for females. The per capita income for the city was $19,674. About 3.2% of families and 7.7% of the population were below the poverty line, including 7.9% of those under age 18 and 13.9% of those age 65 or over.

== Arts and culture ==
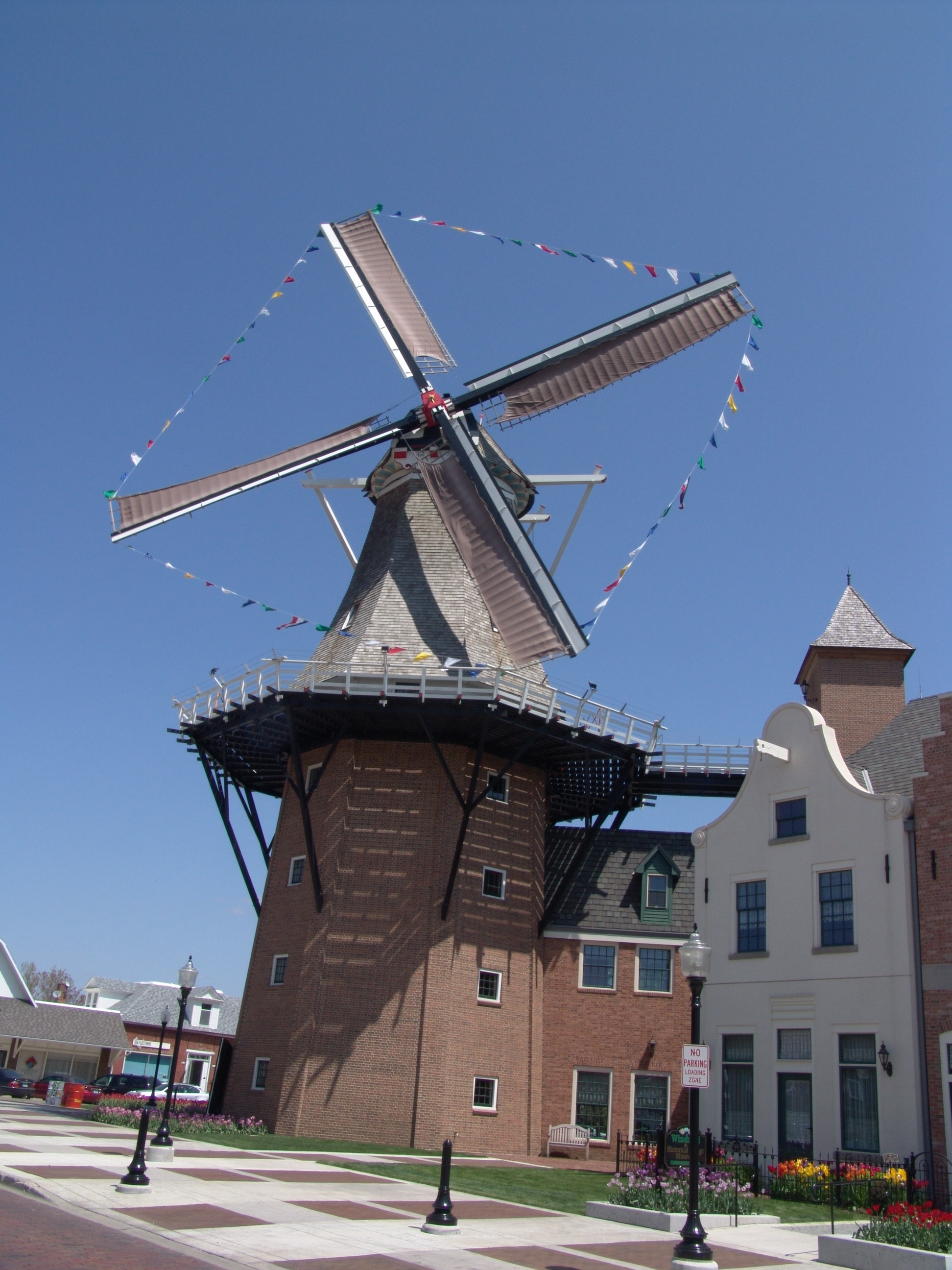
Pella's Vermeer Mill

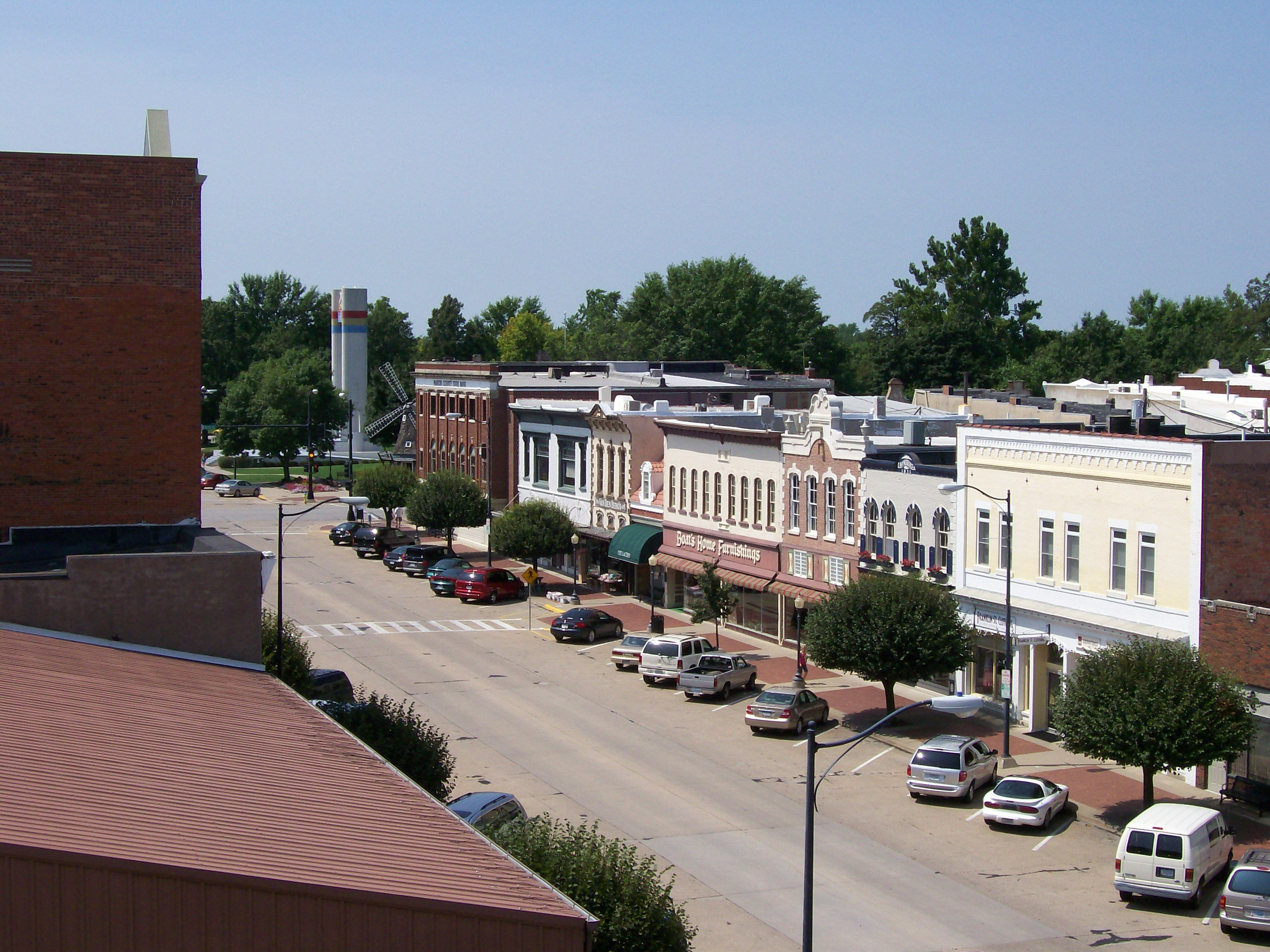
Franklin Street in Pella and some of the businesses located there: Notable in the background are the Tulip Toren (tall white statue) and Information Windmill located in Pella's Central Park.

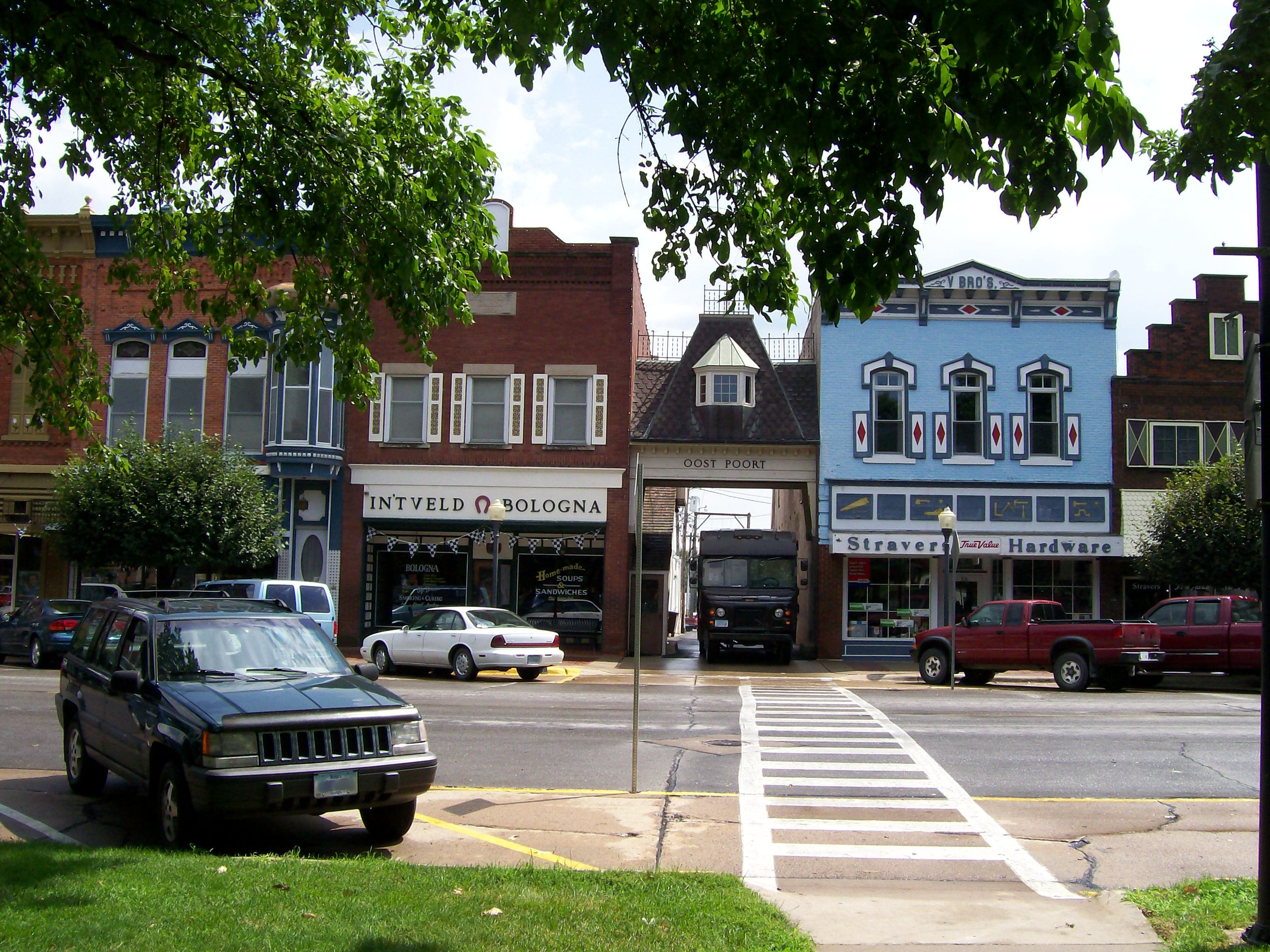
Shops on Main Street in Pella illustrating Dutch architecture

Pella is home to a number of local events and architectural sites.

The Vermeer Mill is a fully functional 1850s-style windmill, reaching 134 ft (41 m) high. The Vermeer Mill grinds wheat into flour using only wind power and is the tallest working windmill in the United States.

The Pella Opera House, built in 1900, was renovated in 1990 and is a popular entertainment destination, featuring stained-glass windows and ornate tin ceilings. A canal winds through nearby Molengracht Plaza, home to shops, restaurants, a hostelry, a movie theatre, and a full-size working drawbridge. On June 28, 2011, Sarah Palin visited the opera house for the premiere of The Undefeated, a documentary about her role in Alaska politics and rise to national attention.

The annual Tulip Time Festival is a celebration of Pella's Dutch heritage. It features tulip gardens, performances, crafters, music, food, Dutch costumes, and daily parades. The festival is held for three days (Thursday, Friday, and Saturday) during the first weekend in May. A queen and court are selected from the two high schools in the town to represent Pella and advertise the Festival. During the 2010 Festival, a world record was set for the most people dancing in wooden shoes. Over 2,600 people danced for more than six minutes to set the new standard.

Pella Dutch is a dialect of the Dutch language and spoken in Pella.

== Education ==
The Pella Community School District operates local public schools.

Pella Christian Grade School (Pre-K through 8) and Pella Christian High School (9-12) serve students in Pella and the surrounding areas.

In April 2011, Forbes rated Pella as third on its list of "The Best Schools For Your Real Estate Buck." Central College is located in Pella.

== Parks and recreation ==
A few miles to the west is Lake Red Rock, Iowa's largest reservoir, a popular destination for biking, hiking, boating, and fishing. The Bos Landen golf club is also in the town. The Pella Tulip Festival is held annually, honoring Pella's Dutch heritage.

== Notable people ==
- Bert Bandstra, served one term as a Democratic U.S. Representative
- Rachel Brand, United States Associate Attorney General under US President Donald Trump
- Kory DeHaan, former Major League Baseball player
- Sons of Nicholas Porter Earp:
  - Morgan Earp, lawman, born in Pella
  - Virgil Earp, lawman, deputy U.S. Marshal
  - Wyatt Earp, lawman and gunfighter of OK Corral fame, spent most of his childhood in Pella
  - Warren Earp, youngest of Earp brothers, born in Pella
- Paul Emerick, professional rugby player, 2006 MVP
- John Hospers, academic and the first Libertarian presidential candidate in 1972
- Dave Keuning, guitarist for The Killers
- Barb Kniff McCulla, member of the Iowa House of Representatives
- Kyle Korver, former professional basketball player
- Louis LeCocq, Pella native, World War I-era auto racer, killed in 1919 Indianapolis 500
- Wendell L. Roelofs, scientist
- Ron Schipper, football coach, member of the College Football Hall of Fame
- Edward Owings Towne, author and playwright
- Andy Thompson, Ohio state representative, born in Pella

== See also ==
- Dutch letter – a pastry first introduced to the United States in Pella
