= National Register of Historic Places listings in Des Moines County, Iowa =

Location of Des Moines County in Iowa

This is a list of the National Register of Historic Places listings in Des Moines County, Iowa.

This is intended to be a complete list of the properties and districts on the National Register of Historic Places in Des Moines County, Iowa, United States. Latitude and longitude coordinates are provided for many National Register properties and districts; these locations may be seen together in an online map.

There are 36 properties and districts listed on the National Register in the county. Another 4 properties were once listed but have been removed.

This National Park Service list is complete through NPS recent listings posted June 13, 2025.

== Current listings ==
	Name on the Register	Image	Date listed	Location	City or town	Description
1	Robert and Catharine (Ripley) Allen House		June 16, 2025 (#100011922)	17201 Highway 61; 40°55′53″N 91°10′12″W	Sperry vicinity	
2	Aspen Grove Cemetery Historic District		April 22, 2022 (#100007633)	2043 Sunnyside Ave. 40°49′39″N 91°07′11″W	Burlington	
3	Baptist Church	Baptist Church	April 18, 1977 (#77000509)	West of Sperry off U.S. Route 61; 40°57′30″N 91°11′56″W	Sperry	
4	Bridgeport Bridge	Bridgeport Bridge	May 15, 1998 (#98000533)	Old Quarry Rd. 40°47′26″N 91°21′51″W	Denmark	A Pennsylvania through truss bridge built by the Clinton Bridge and Iron Works and completed in 1904. Extends into Lee County.
5	Burlington and Missouri River Railroad Passenger Station	Burlington and Missouri River Railroad Passenger Station	October 22, 1976 (#76000761)	237 S. 4th St. 40°48′22″N 91°06′19″W	Burlington	
6	Burlington High School		October 10, 2024 (#100010911)	1201 Valley Street; 40°48′39″N 91°06′50″W	Burlington	Not the current high school, most recently the Apollo Middle School.
7	Burlington Public Library	Burlington Public Library	March 27, 1975 (#75000682)	501 N. 4th St. 40°48′44″N 91°06′13″W	Burlington	
8	Burlington, Cedar Rapids & Northern Freight House	Burlington, Cedar Rapids & Northern Freight House	January 27, 1983 (#83000351)	Front and High Sts. 40°48′50″N 91°05′56″W	Burlington	
9	The Capitol Theater	The Capitol Theater	November 22, 1996 (#96001373)	211 N. 3rd St. 40°48′34″N 91°06′11″W	Burlington	
10	Cascade Bridge	Cascade Bridge	June 25, 1998 (#98000793)	S. Main St. over the Cascade Ravine; 40°46′52″N 91°05′54″W	Burlington	
11	Chicago, Burlington, and Quincy Station	Chicago, Burlington, and Quincy Station	February 4, 2002 (#01001540)	300 S Main St. 40°48′21″N 91°06′06″W	Burlington	
12	Church of St. John the Baptist	Church of St. John the Baptist	February 26, 1982 (#82002615)	712 Division St. 40°48′28″N 91°06′31″W	Burlington	
13	Crapo Park and Arboretum Historic District	Crapo Park and Arboretum Historic District	June 3, 1976 (#76000762)	Bounded by Parkway Dr., Koestner, Madison Rd., and the Mississippi River; 40°46′33″N 91°06′07″W	Burlington	
14	Mary Darwin House	Mary Darwin House	January 24, 1980 (#80001445)	537 Summer St. 40°48′06″N 91°06′51″W	Burlington	
15	Des Moines County Court House	Des Moines County Court House	August 28, 2003 (#03000817)	513 N. Main St. 40°48′43″N 91°06′04″W	Burlington	
16	Augustus Caesar Dodge House	Augustus Caesar Dodge House	January 25, 1980 (#80001446)	829 N. 5th St. 40°48′57″N 91°06′12″W	Burlington	
17	Downtown Commercial Historic District	Downtown Commercial Historic District	January 21, 2015 (#14001168)	100-800 blocks of Jefferson Street, plus parts of adjacent blocks east of 4th Street from Columbia to Market; 40°48′36″N 91°06′10″W	Burlington	
18	First Congregational Church	First Congregational Church	November 21, 1976 (#76000763)	313 N. 4th St. 40°48′38″N 91°06′14″W	Burlington	
19	James M. Forney House	James M. Forney House	September 22, 1986 (#86002689)	401 Cedar St. 40°48′02″N 91°06′13″W	Burlington	
20	German Methodist Episcopal Church	German Methodist Episcopal Church	September 22, 1977 (#77000508)	7th and Washington Sts. 40°48′43″N 91°06′24″W	Burlington	
21	Hawkeye Creek Bridge	Hawkeye Creek Bridge	June 25, 1998 (#98000790)	Hawkeye Rd. over Hawkeye Creek; 41°02′33″N 91°03′26″W	Mediapolis	
22	Hedge Block	Hedge Block	October 7, 1982 (#82000405)	401-407 Jefferson St. 40°48′36″N 91°06′15″W	Burlington	
23	Heritage Hill Historic District	Heritage Hill Historic District	December 21, 1982 (#82000406)	Roughly bounded by Central Ave. and High, 3rd, and Jefferson Sts. 40°48′46″N 91°06′22″W	Burlington	
24	Hotel Burlington	Hotel Burlington	December 31, 1987 (#87002214)	206 N. 3rd St. 40°48′33″N 91°06′09″W	Burlington	
25	Jagger-Churchill House	Jagger-Churchill House	March 5, 1982 (#82002616)	201 Spring St. 40°48′55″N 91°06′00″W	Burlington	
26	Lagomarcino-Grupe Company	Lagomarcino-Grupe Company	September 30, 2013 (#13000796)	101-111 Valley St. 40°48′31″N 91°06′04″W	Burlington	
27	Lock and Dam No. 18 Historic District	Lock and Dam No. 18 Historic District	March 10, 2004 (#04000178)	Spanning the Mississippi River, 1.5 miles north of an unnamed county road from Gladstone, Illinois; 40°52′56″N 91°01′27″W	Burlington	Extends into Henderson County, Illinois.
28	Manufacturing and Wholesale Historic District	Manufacturing and Wholesale Historic District	June 12, 2012 (#12000326)	Roughly 209 N. 3rd to 231 S. 3rd & 219 to 425 Valley Sts. 40°48′29″N 91°06′12″W	Burlington	
29	Dennis Melcher Pottery and House	Dennis Melcher Pottery and House	August 28, 2003 (#03000832)	22981 and 22982 Agency Rd. 40°48′58″N 91°22′18″W	Danville	
30	Prairie Grove School		May 20, 2019 (#100003973)	13598 Beaverdale Rd. 40°52′49″N 91°14′55″W	West Burlington	
31	Schramm Building	Schramm Building	March 12, 1999 (#99000310)	212 Jefferson St. 40°48′36″N 91°06′07″W	Burlington	
32	Snake Alley	Snake Alley	September 6, 1974 (#74000783)	N. 6th St. between Washington and Columbia Sts. 40°48′43″N 91°06′21″W	Burlington	Street of many curves
33	Snake Alley Historic District	Snake Alley Historic District	May 21, 1975 (#75000683)	Roughly bounded by Columbia and Washington Sts., Cobblestone Alley, and Service Dr. 40°48′43″N 91°06′21″W	Burlington	
34	Starker-Leopold Historic District	Starker-Leopold Historic District	February 2, 1983 (#83000352)	101 and 111 Clay and 110 Grand Sts. 40°47′43″N 91°05′47″W	Burlington	
35	West Jefferson Street Historic District	West Jefferson Street Historic District	April 9, 1991 (#91000409)	Roughly the 400 to 800 blocks of W. Jefferson St. 40°48′38″N 91°06′22″W	Burlington	
36	Abiathar and Nancy White House	Abiathar and Nancy White House	January 15, 2014 (#13001076)	713 N. Main St. 40°48′50″N 91°06′01″W	Burlington	

== Former listings ==
	Name on the Register	Image	Date listed	Date removed	Location	City or town	Description
1	Flint River Bridge		June 25, 1998 (#98000792)	October 15, 2014	155th St. over the Flint River; 40°54′19″N 91°13′22″W	Burlington	
2	Charles Mason House	Charles Mason House	January 25, 1980 (#80001447)	September 23, 1987	931 N. 6th St. 40°49′03″N 91°06′15″W	Burlington	Demolished in 1984
3	Union Hotel	Union Hotel	April 4, 1993 (#93000328)	May 12, 2009	301-311 S. Main St. 40°48′21″N 91°06′09″W	Burlington	Hotel is the white and light gray building at the far right, matching a drawing in Commercial and Statistical Review of the City of Burlington, Iowa (1882).
4	Yellow Spring Creek Bridge		June 25, 1998 (#98000791)	December 15, 2003	Sperry Rd. over Yellow Spring Creek	Mediapolis	

== See also ==
- List of National Historic Landmarks in Iowa
- National Register of Historic Places listings in Iowa
- Listings in neighboring counties: Hancock (IL), Henderson (IL), Henry, Lee, Louisa, Mercer (IL)
