= Melcher =

Melcher may refer to:

== Geography ==
In the United States:

- Melcher-Dallas, Iowa
- Melcher Covered Bridge, Indiana

== People with the surname ==
- Al Melcher (1884–1944), American racecar driver
- Arturo Melcher (Borquez) (1921–2008), Chilean hammer thrower, competitor at the 1952 Summer Olympics
- Christin Melcher (born 1983), German politician
- David Melcher (born 1954), American businessman and retired Lieutenant General
- Erhard Melcher (born 1940), German engineer
- Frederic G. Melcher (1879–1963), American publisher
- Holman S. Melcher (1841–1905), American Civil War officer and postbellum mayor of Portland, Maine.
- James Melcher (born 1939), American Olympic fencer and hedge fund manager
- John Melcher (1924–2018), American politician
- Joseph Melcher (1806–1873), Roman Catholic bishop
- Kurt Melcher (1881–1970), German lawyer and politician
- Martin Melcher (1915–1968), American film producer
- Nancy Melcher (1916–2015), American lingerie designer
- Tai Melcher, American mathematician
- Terry Melcher (1942–2004), American musician and record producer
- Wilhelm Melcher (1940–2005), German violinist

== See also ==
- Dennis Melcher Pottery and House, listed on the National Register of Historic Places
- Melchers (disambiguation)
