= Downtown Commercial Historic District (Burlington, Iowa) =

Historic district in Iowa, United States

- U.S. National Register of Historic Places
- U.S. Historic district
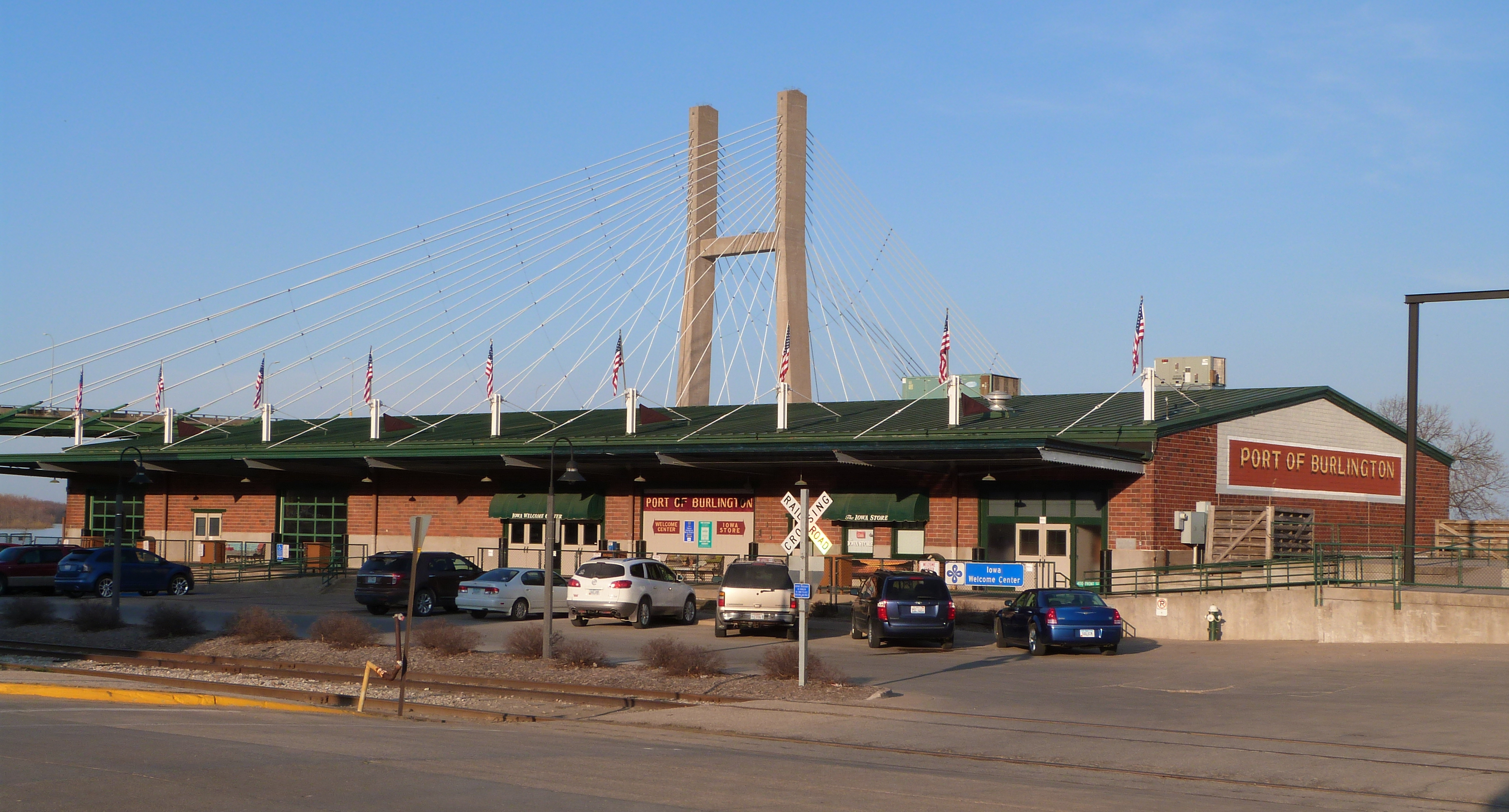
- Municipal River Terminal (1928) in 2013.

- Location within Iowa Location within the United States
- Location: 100-800 blocks of Jefferson Street, plus parts of adjacent blocks east of 4th Street from Columbia to Market, Burlington, Iowa
- Coordinates: 40°48′36″N 91°06′10″W
- NRHP reference No.: 14001168
- Added to NRHP: January 21, 2015

The Downtown Commercial Historic District encompasses most of the central business district of Burlington, Iowa, United States. It was listed on the National Register of Historic Places in 2015. The historic district includes 65 properties that were part of a 2012 to 2013 survey of the area. It also includes as contributing properties the buildings in the West Jefferson Street Historic District and three buildings in the Manufacturing and Wholesale Historic District that were previously listed on the National Register. All total there are 122 resources within the district, which includes 108 contributing and 14 non-contributing properties.

The downtown area developed in three periods. The first period (1865–1894) was an era of prosperity associated with the development of the city's railroad connections after the American Civil War. The second period (1895–1929) was an era of maturity and the development of modern commercial buildings. This is the time period when Burlington's "tall" downtown buildings were built. The third period (1930–1967) saw competition from suburban development, especially in West Burlington. There were efforts to retain old businesses and attract new ones, while modernizing and improving the area. The inclusion of West Jefferson Street was important because it was the main thoroughfare in the late 19th and early 20th centuries through the Hawkeye Creek Valley. It led from the central business district along the Mississippi River to the Agency Road that headed westward out of town.

For the most part the buildings in the district housed commercial enterprises, both retail, banking and professional offices. The government buildings are, for the most part, located elsewhere. The taller buildings are located on the east side along Jefferson Street and the adjacent blocks. Most of the buildings are three to four stories, with the tallest buildings rising eight to nine stories. There are also numerous one- and two-story structures. The buildings are mostly brick. The older buildings from the first period tend toward the Italianate and the Romanesque Revival styles. The taller, more modern buildings of the second period tend to utilize the Neoclassical style, and the buildings in the third period are in the more simplified modern styles.

== Contributing properties ==
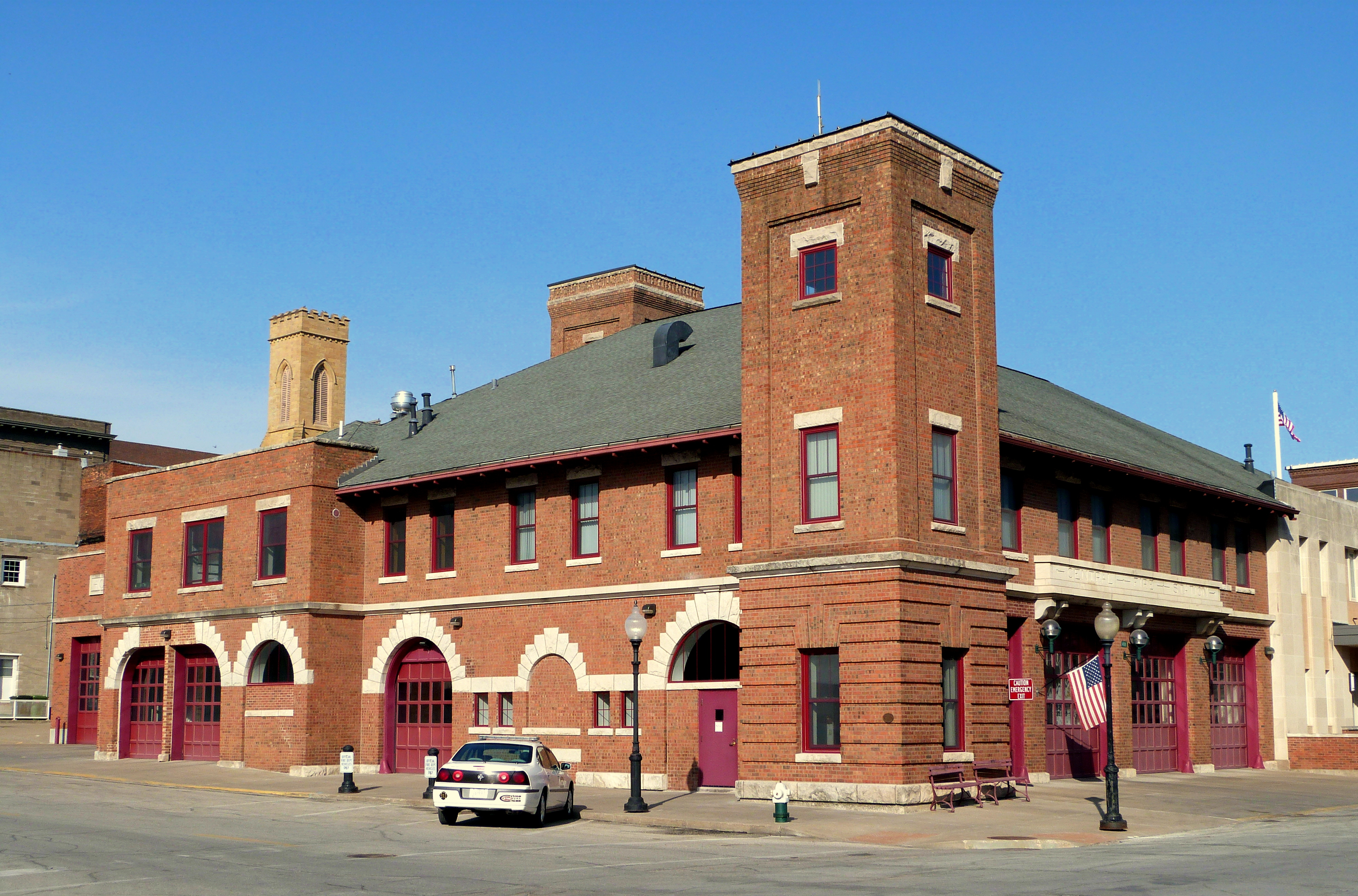
Burlington Fire-Police Station (1907)

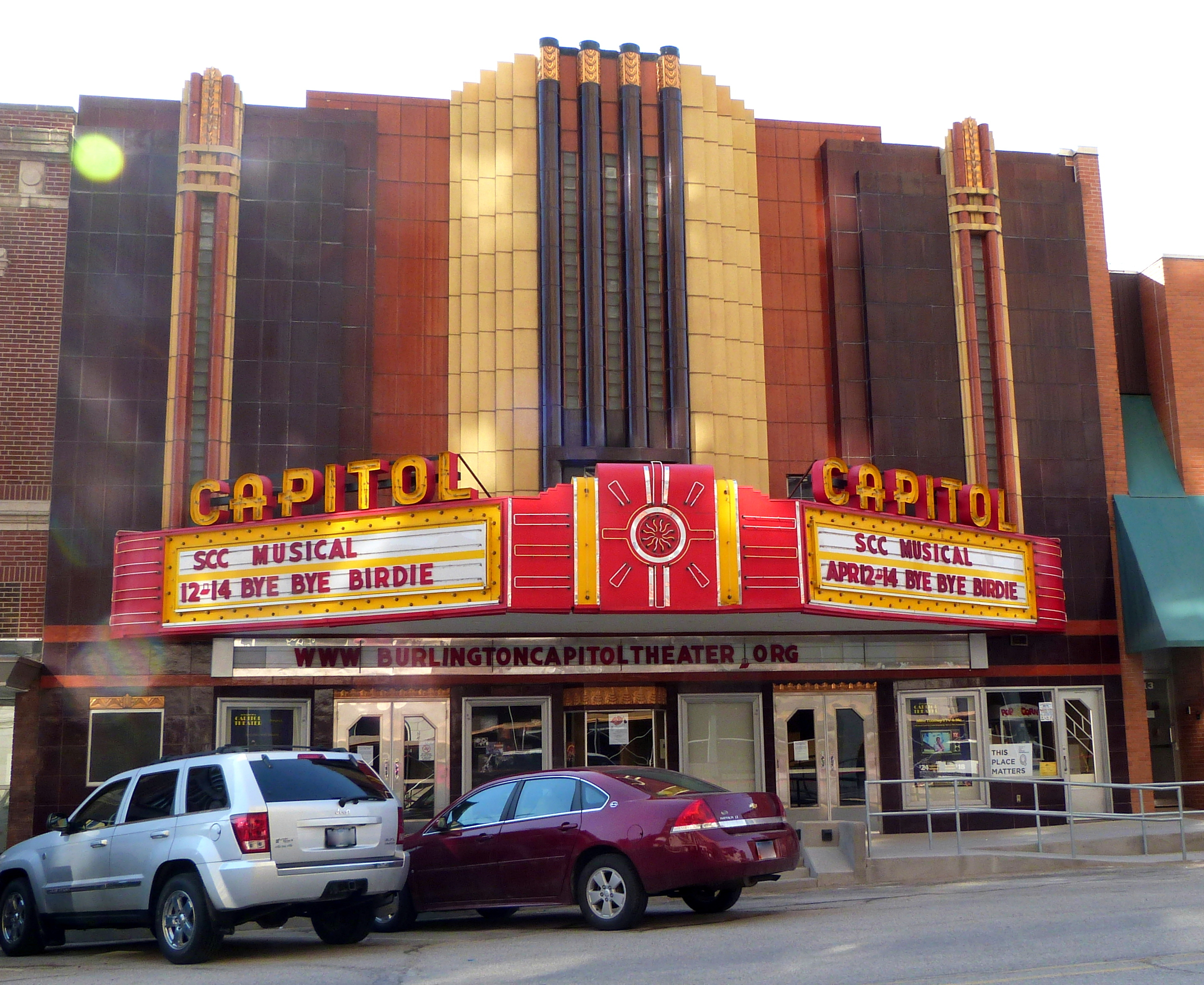
Capitol Theater (1937)

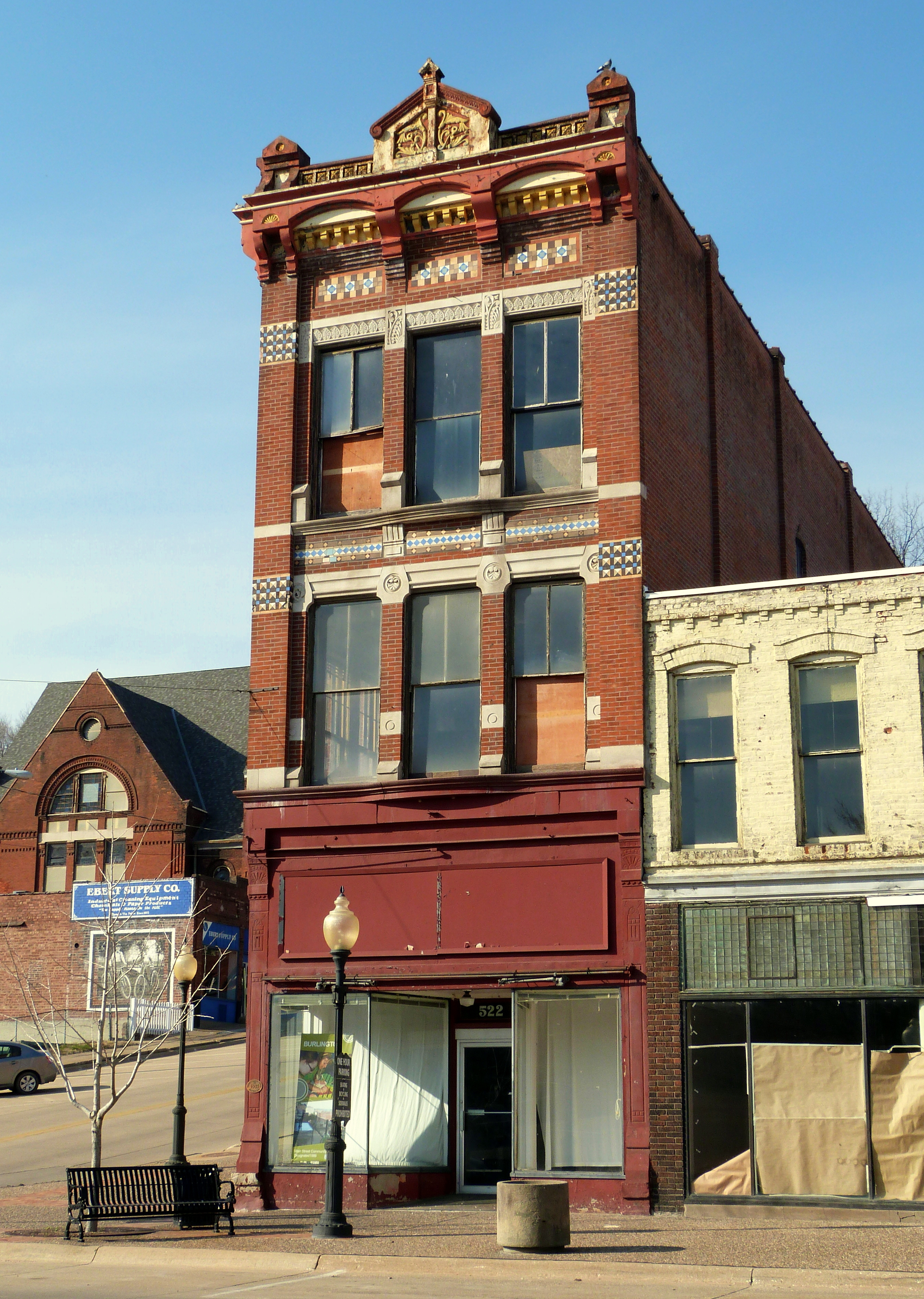
Forney & Mellinger Block (1883)

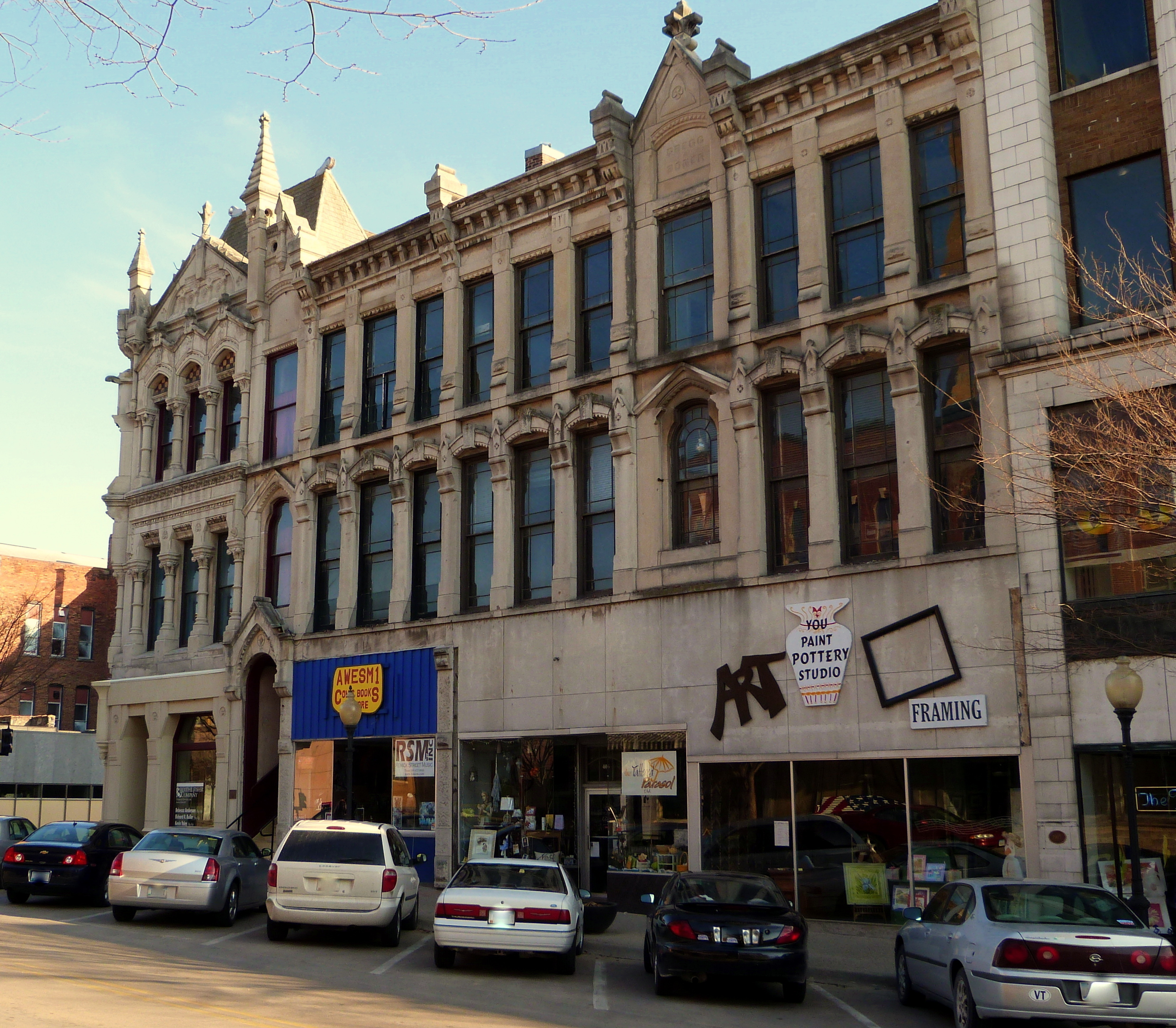
Hedge Block (1881)

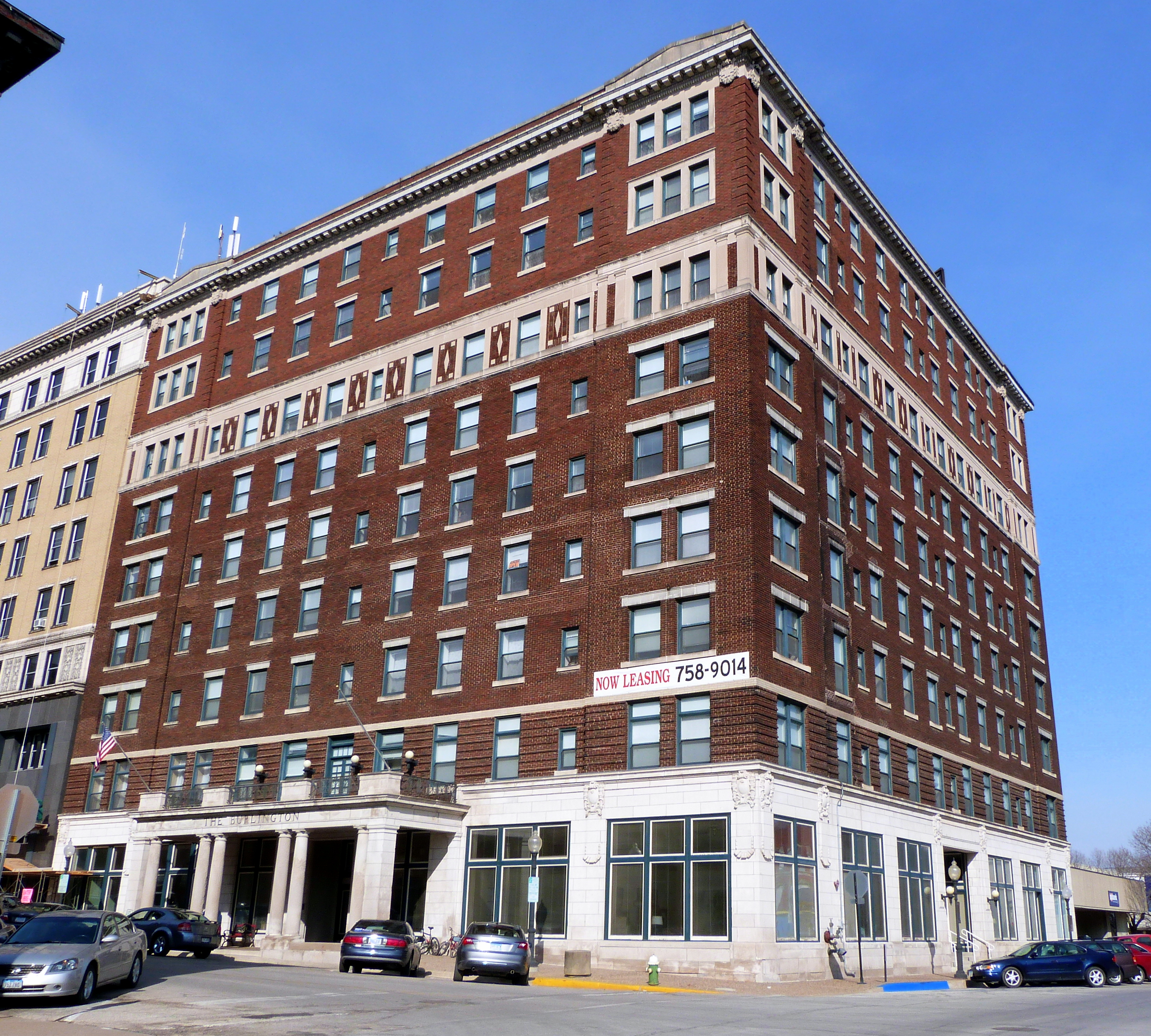
Hotel Burlington (1911)

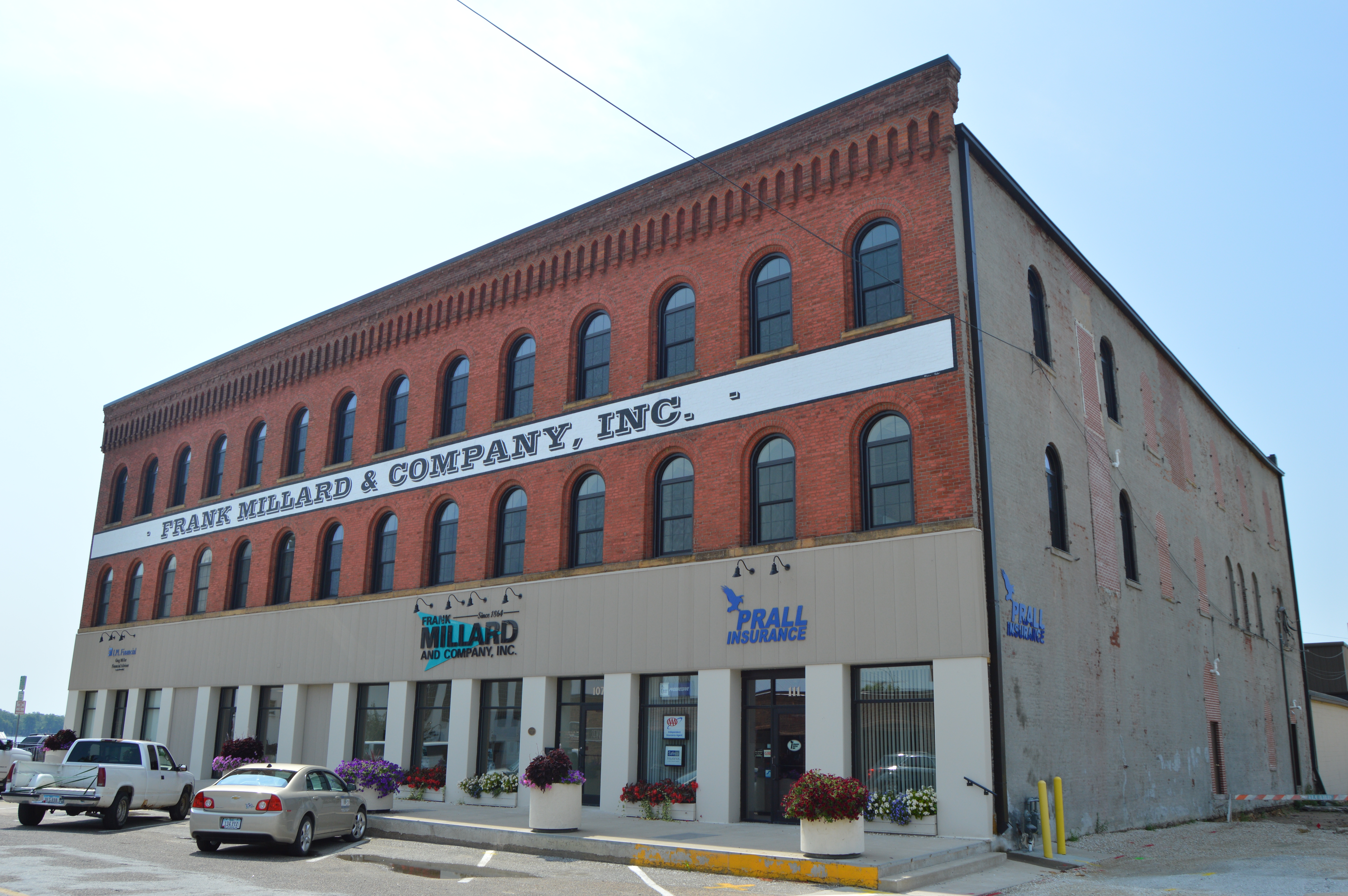
Lagomarcino-Grupe Company (1868)

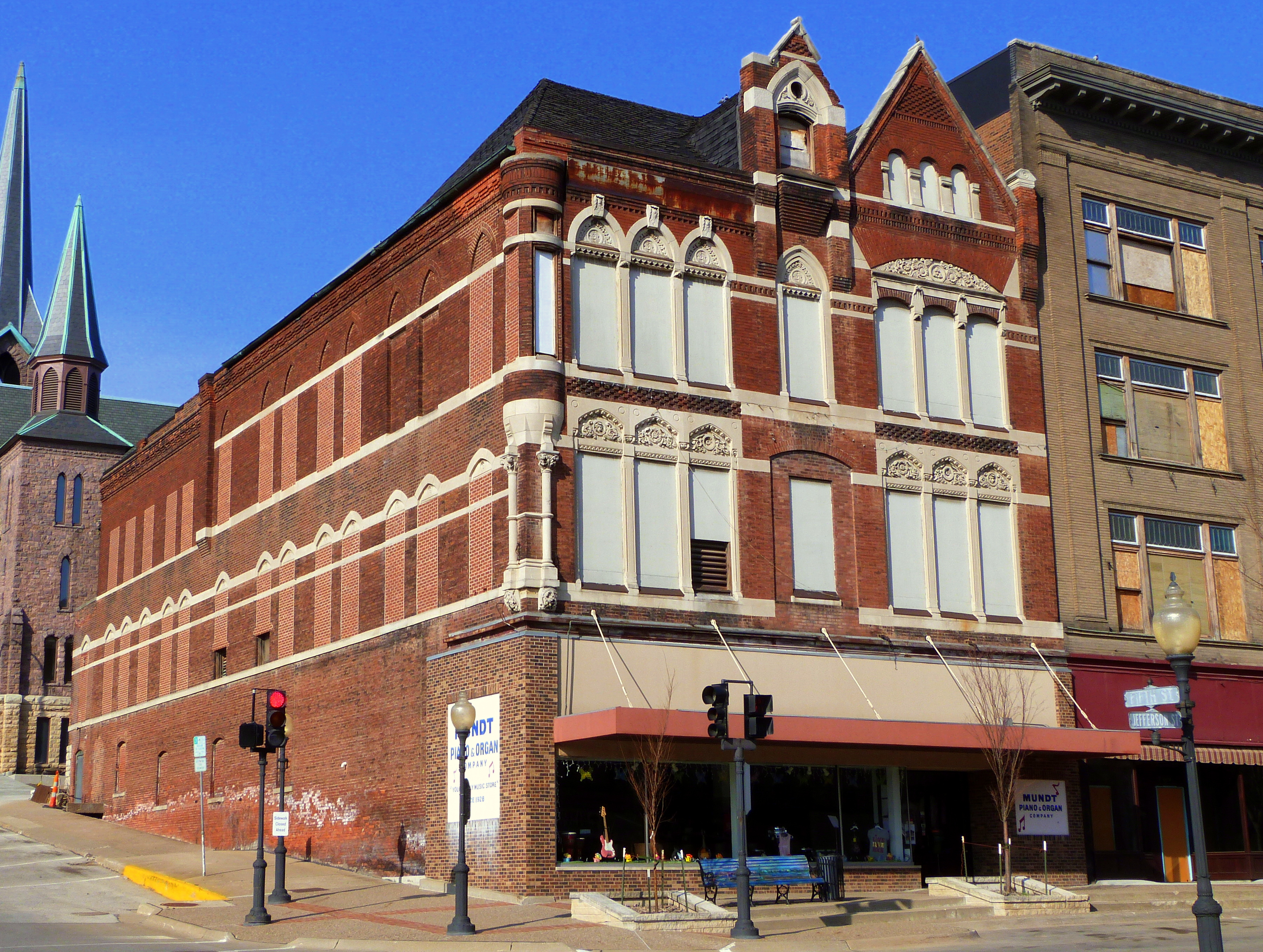
Masonic Temple-Gregg Building (1884)

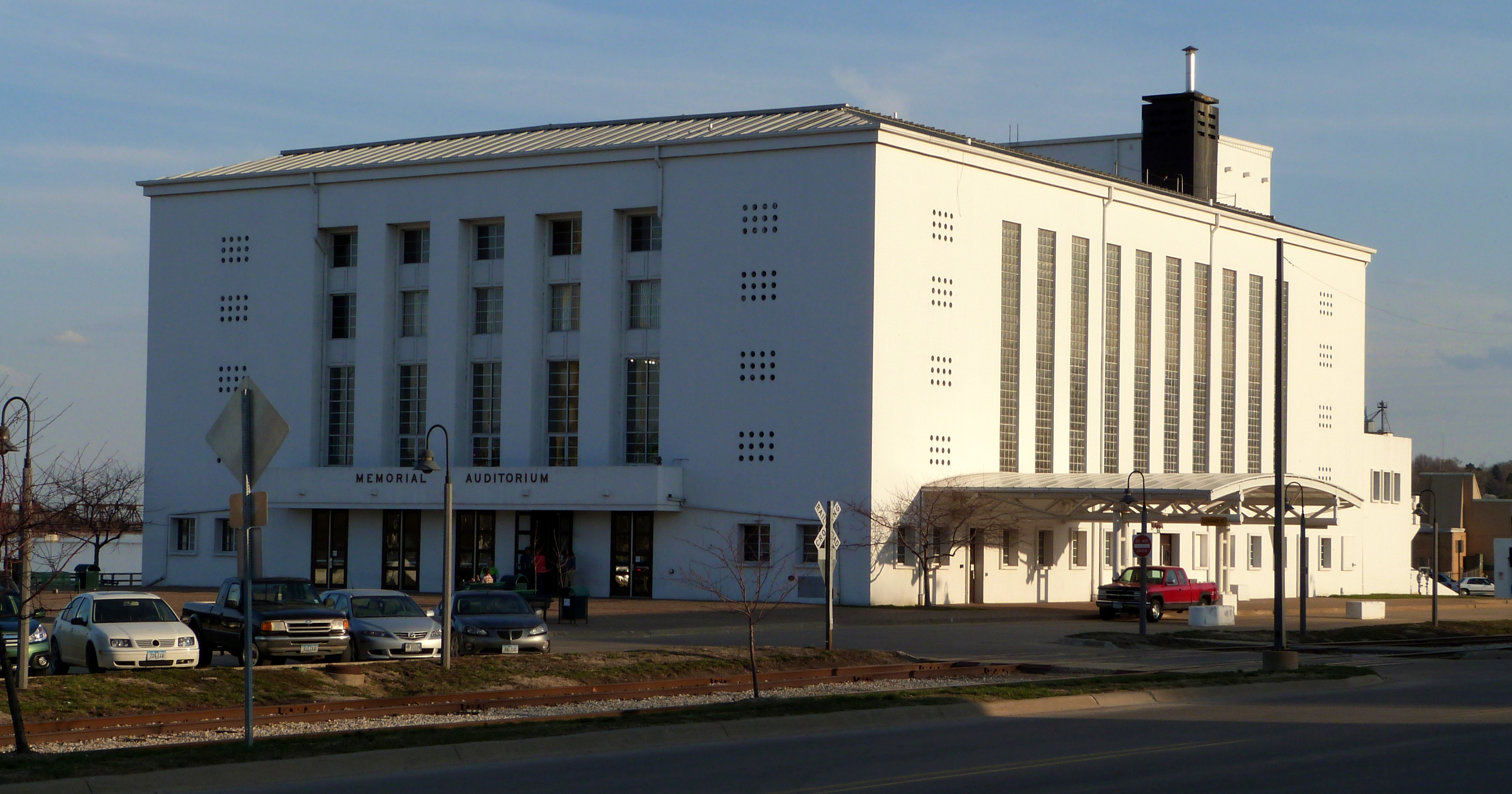
Memorial Auditorium (1939)

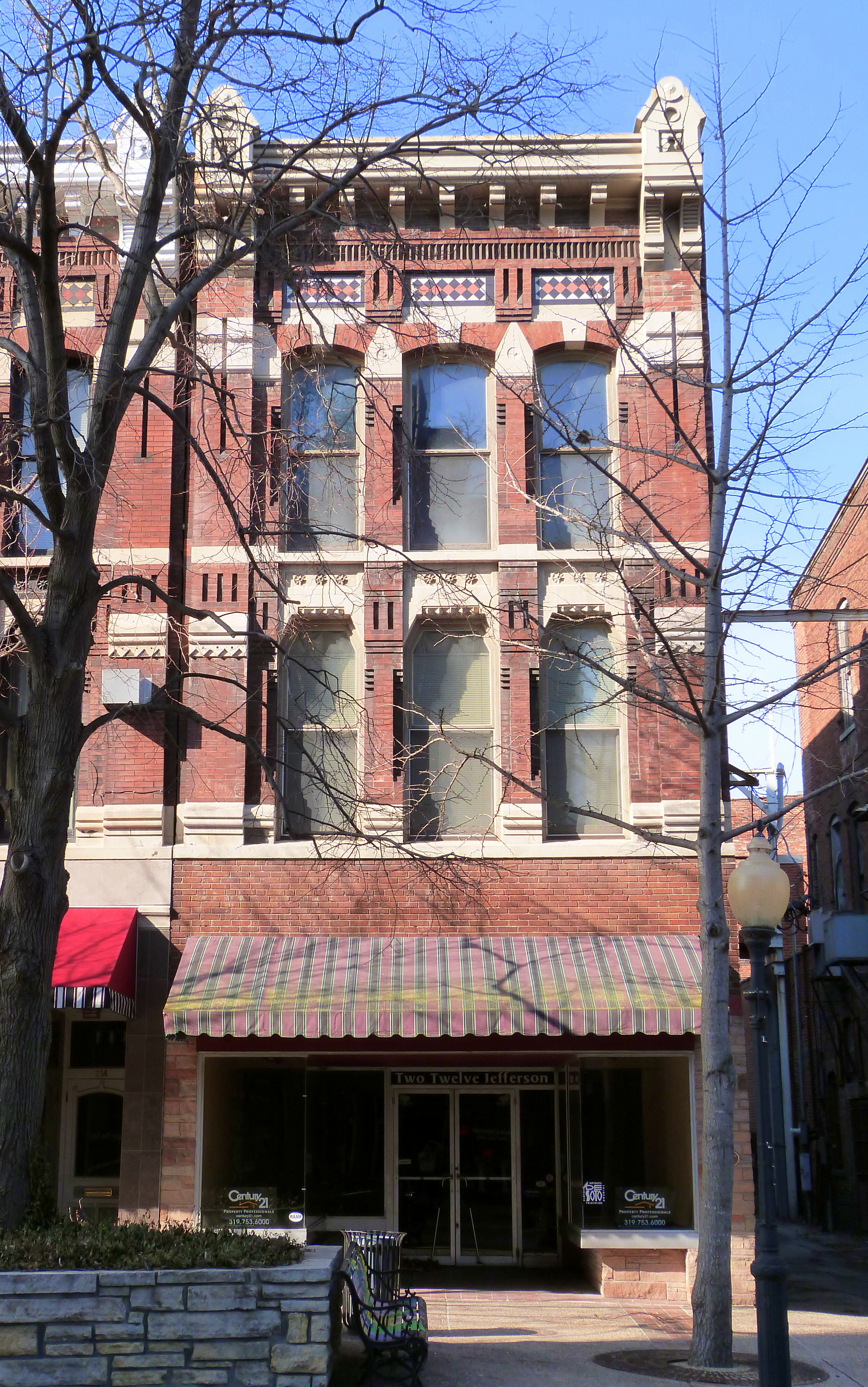
Schramm Building (1878)

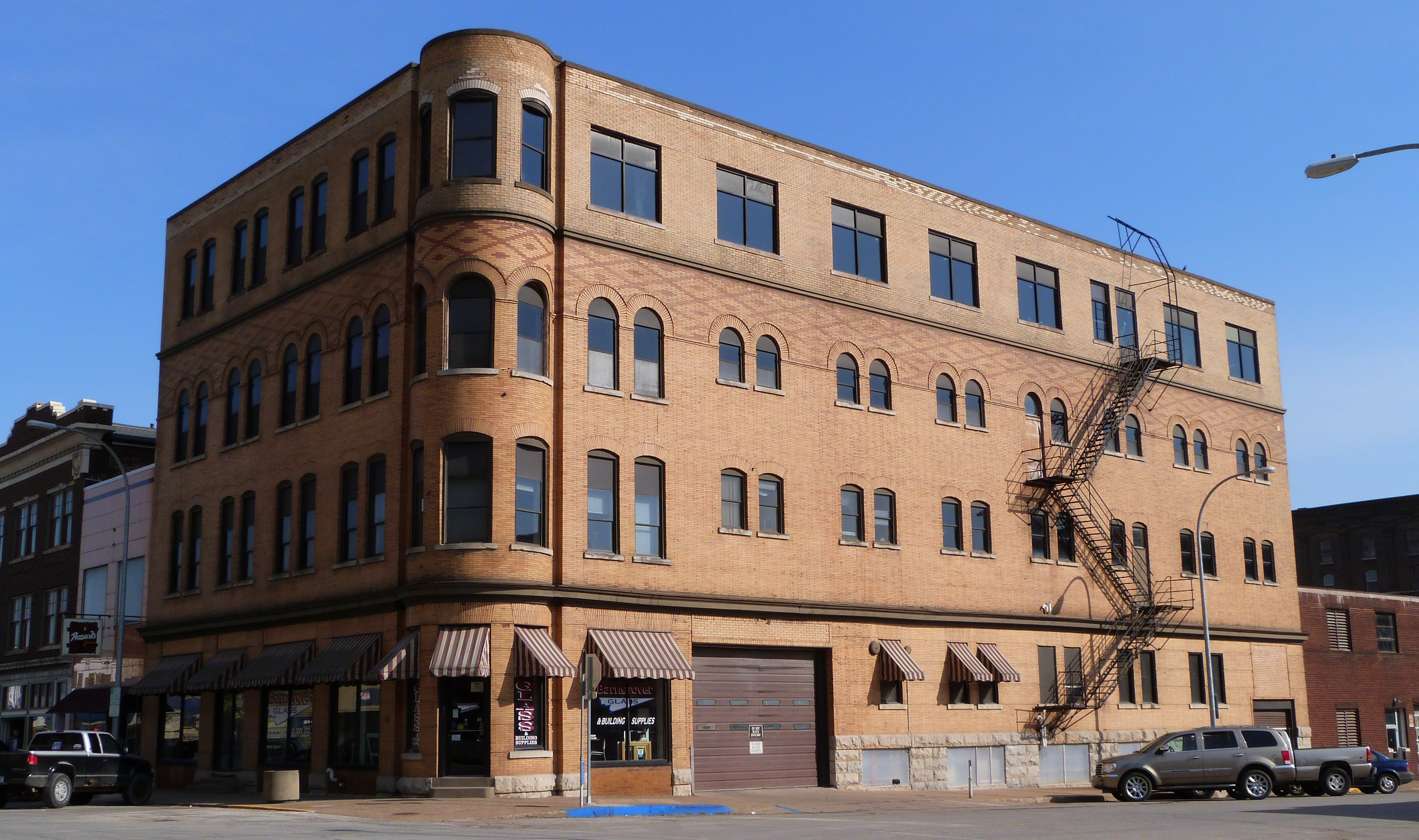
Unterkircher Building (1892)

== See also ==
- National Register of Historic Places listings in Des Moines County, Iowa
- Media related to Downtown Commercial Historic District (Burlington, Iowa) at Wikimedia Commons
