= Starker–Leopold Historic District =

Historic district in Iowa, United States

- U.S. National Register of Historic Places
- U.S. Historic district
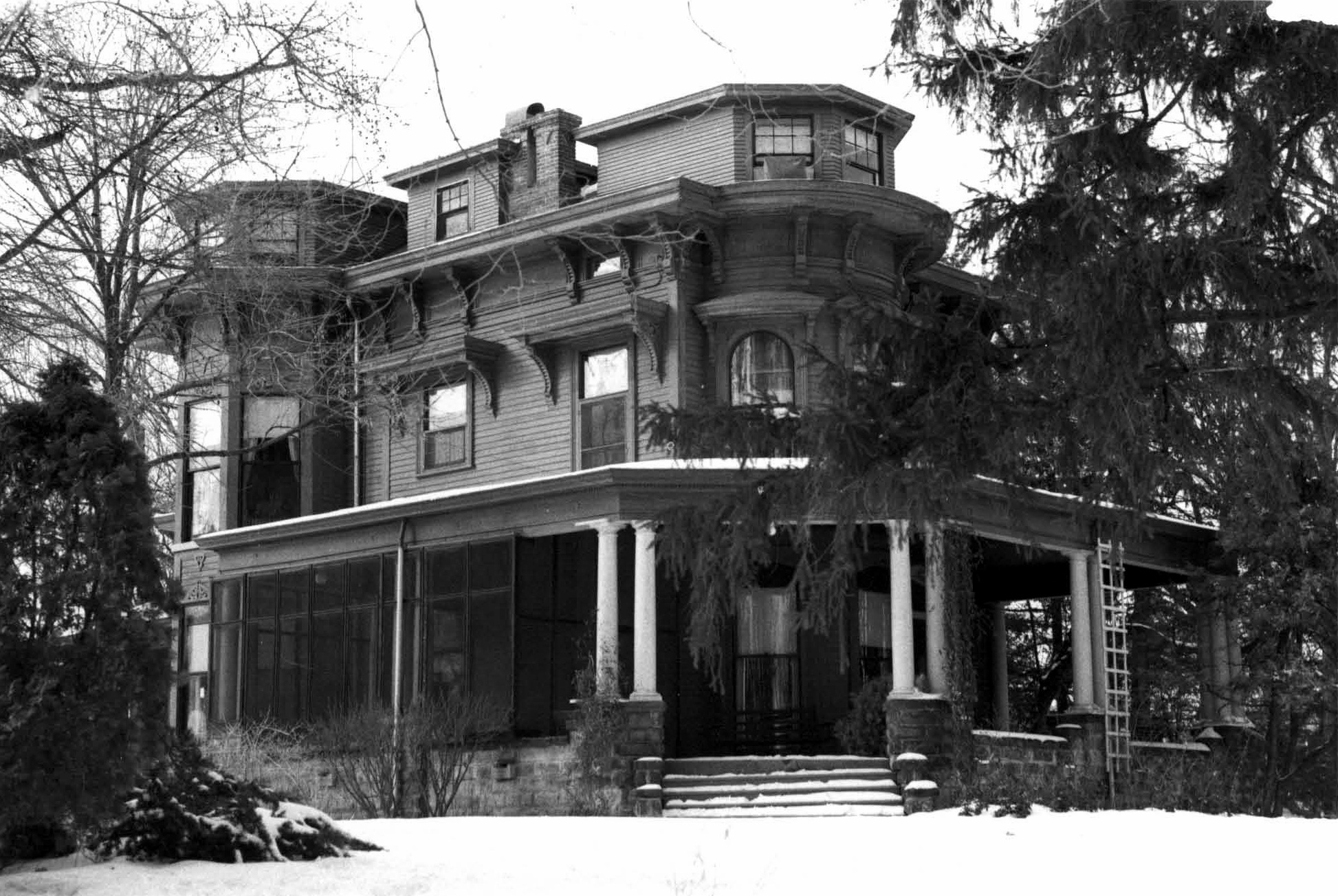
- Charles Starker House

- Location within Iowa Location within the United States
- Location: 101 and 111 Clay and 110 Grand Sts., Burlington, Iowa
- Coordinates: 40°47′43″N 91°05′47″W
- Area: 4.5 acres (1.8 ha)
- NRHP reference No.: 83000352
- Added to NRHP: February 2, 1983

The Starker–Leopold Historic District is composed of three houses and the surrounding grounds overlooking the Mississippi River in Burlington, Iowa, United States. It was listed on the National Register of Historic Places in 1983. The houses were built by the Starker-Leopold family who lived in them for most of their existence. Charles Starker was a successful Burlington businessman who contributed to public building and park development projects. He worked as an architect, engineer, and merchant before becoming an influential banker. His daughter Clara Starker-Leopold instilled her father's values in her children. Carl Leopold was Clara's husband and a local wood-working businessman and outdoor enthusiast.

The grounds on which the houses were built is divided into three distinct properties, but the lawn areas are open to each other and feature interior sidewalks that serve a centrally located garage. The Charles Starker House (101 Clay) is a large, Italianate frame house that was built sometime between 1868 and 1874. An extensive Georgian Revival porch was added around 1907. It is built on a limestone block foundation. The first Carl A. Leopold House (111 Clay) is a 2½-story, rustic Queen Anne-style residence built around 1893. It features a multiple gable roof and a central chimney. The foundation and first floor of the house are composed of rough-faced, cut limestone that was laid in a random manner. The second Carl S. Leopold House (110 Grand) is a 2½-story Colonial Revival-style residence with a gambrel roof and flared eaves. It was built around 1922.

== See also ==
- National Register of Historic Places listings in Des Moines County, Iowa
