= Melchers =

Melchers is a surname of German language origin, originally found mostly in North Rhine-Westphalia (the former Prussia).

People with this surname include:

- Claudia Melchers (born 1969), Dutch businesswoman and kidnapping victim
- Cor Melchers (1954–2015), Dutch painter
- Corinne Melchers (1880–1955), American painter, humanitarian, and gardener
- Gari Melchers (1860–1932), American painter
- Hans Melchers (born 1938), Dutch businessman
- Julius Theodore Melchers (1829–1908), American sculptor
- Marie Melchers (born 1939), Belgian fencer
- Mirjam Melchers (born 1975), Dutch cyclist
- Paul Melchers (1813–1895), German Roman Catholic clergyman
- Saskia Melchers (born 1962), Dutch cricketer

The Melchers Building, the oldest commercial building in Honolulu, Hawaii, was named for one of its original occupants, trader Gustav C. Melchers.

== See also ==
- Melcher (disambiguation)
