= Manufacturing and Wholesale Historic District =

Historic district in Iowa, United States

- Manufacturing and Wholesale; Historic District
- U.S. National Register of Historic Places
- U.S. Historic district
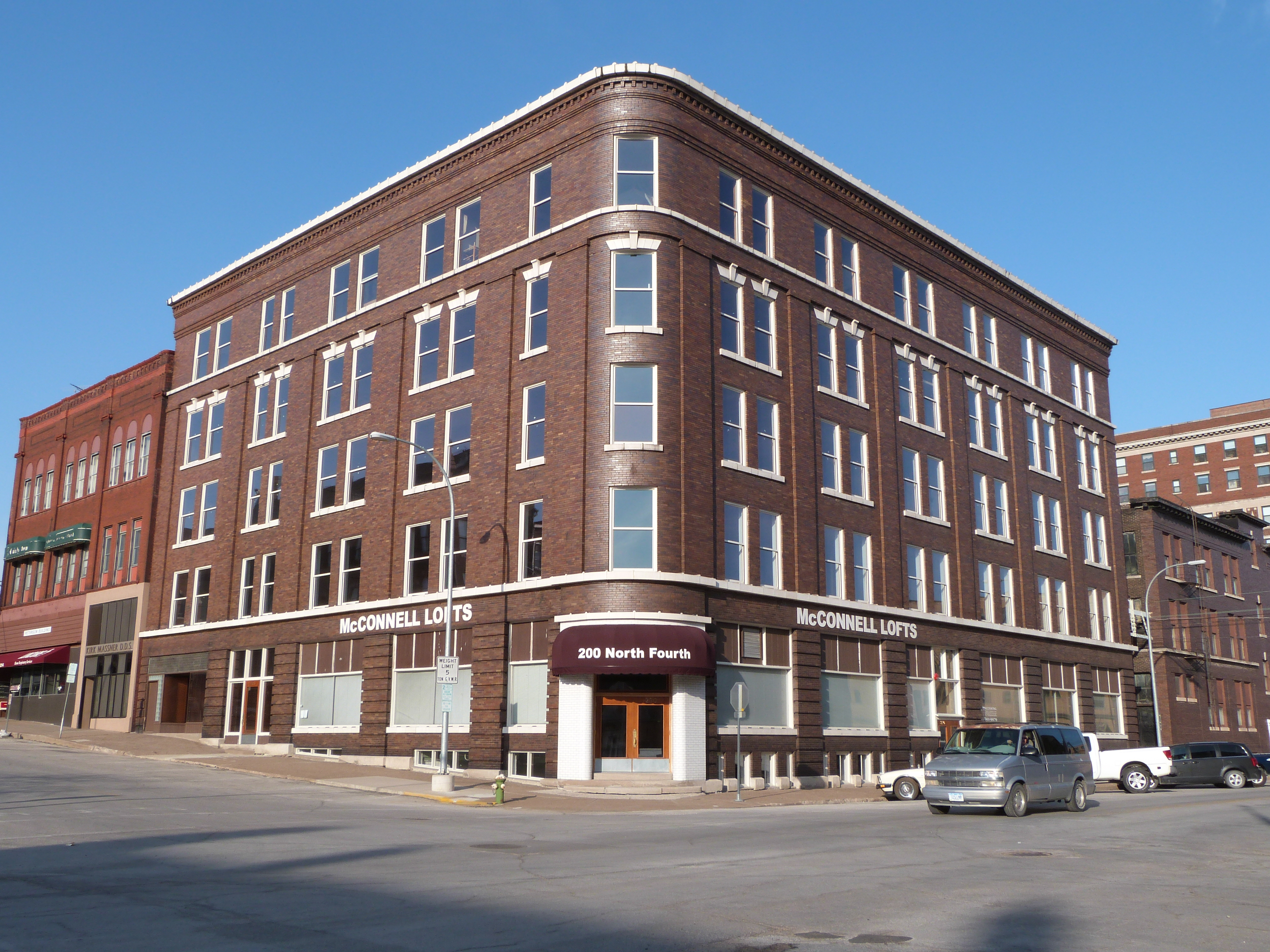
- S.R. and I.C. McConnell Wholesale Saddlery (1907) in 2013.

- Location within Iowa Location within the United States
- Location: Roughly 209 N. 3rd to 231 S. 3rd & 219 to 425 Valley Sts., Burlington, Iowa
- Coordinates: 40°48′29″N 91°06′12″W
- Area: 12.5 acres (5.1 ha)
- NRHP reference No.: 12000326
- Added to NRHP: June 12, 2012

The Manufacturing and Wholesale Historic District is a nationally recognized historic district located adjacent to the central business district of Burlington, Iowa, United States. It was listed on the National Register of Historic Places in 2012. At the time of its nomination it included 32 buildings of which 28 are contributing properties and 14 non-contributing properties. The tracks of the former Chicago, Burlington and Quincy Railroad bisect the district and contributed to its development. The buildings range in size from one single story office structure to two six-story buildings. Nine buildings were constructed before 1900, the earliest in 1876. The rest of the contributing buildings were built from 1900 to the 1930s. The four noncontributing buildings were built from the 1960s to the 1980s. The Romanesque Revival John Blaul and Sons Wholesale Grocery building is the only building that wasn't built in a utilitarian form with only general stylistic influences. All of the buildings are constructed in brick. The area largely housed manufacturing and wholesale businesses into the 1970s and 1980s. A few of them continue to do so into the second decade of the 21st-century.

== Contributing properties ==
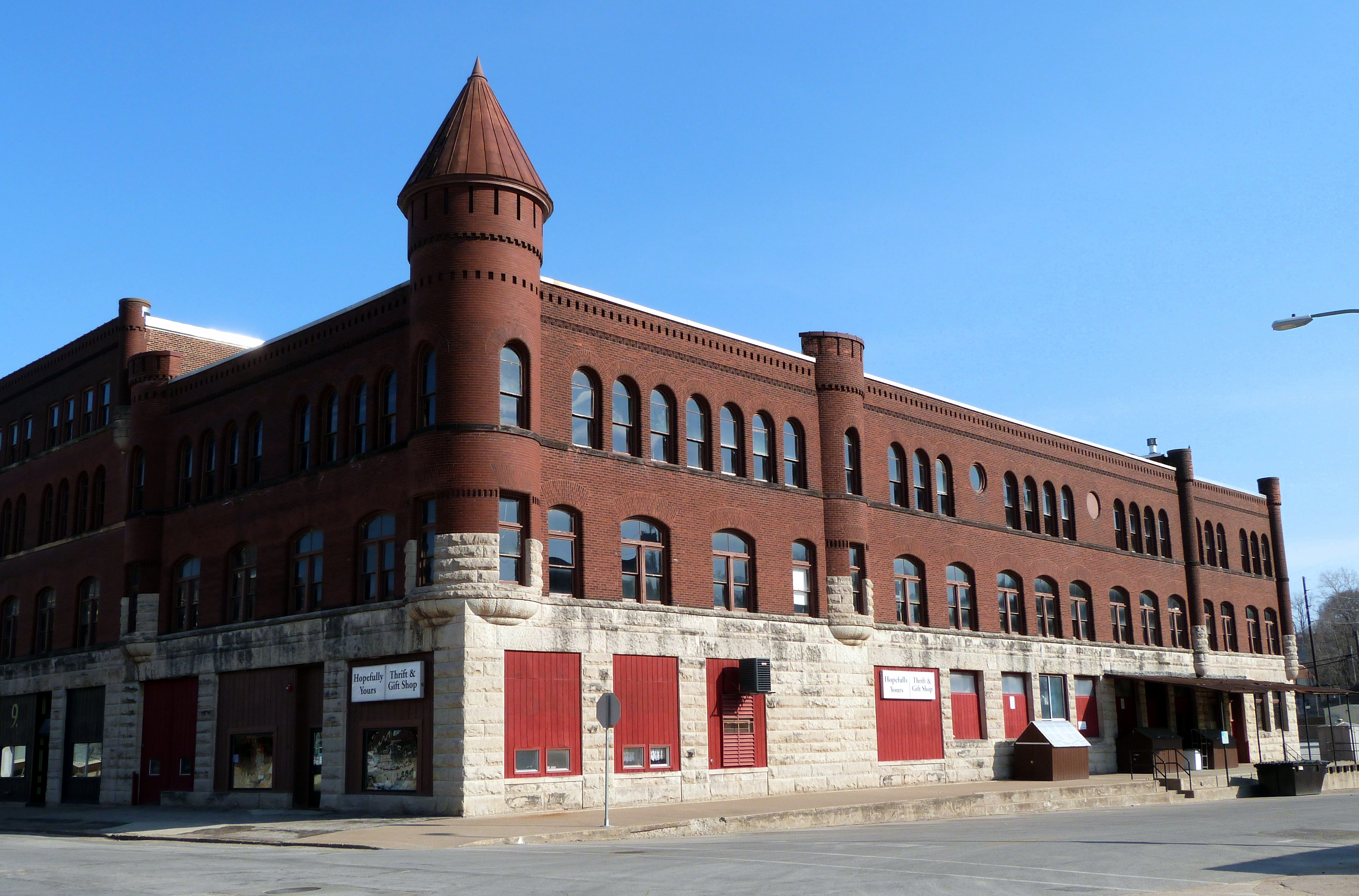
John Blaul and Sons Wholesale Grocery (1892)

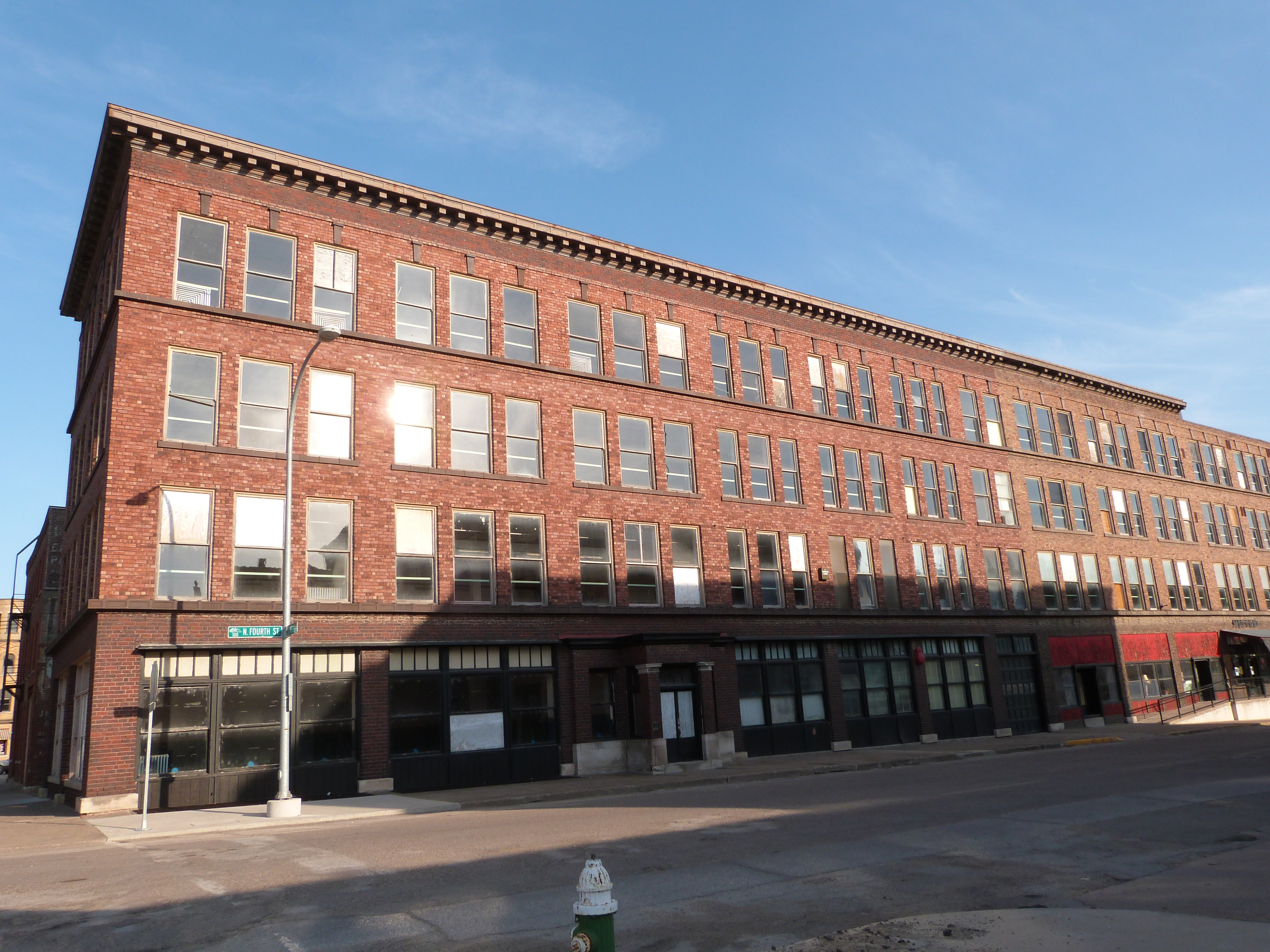
Churchill Drug Company (1920)

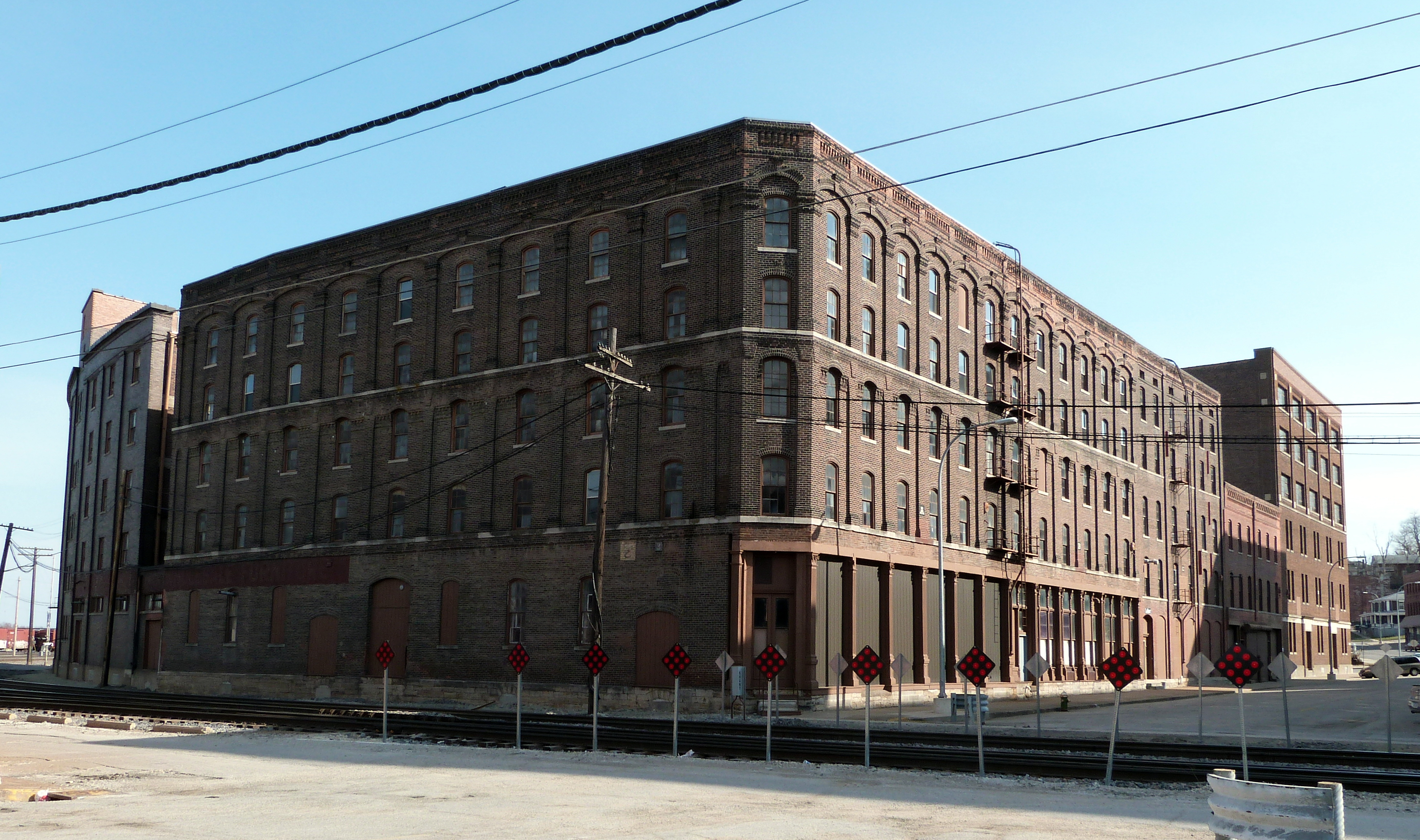
Chittenden & Eastman Company (1876)

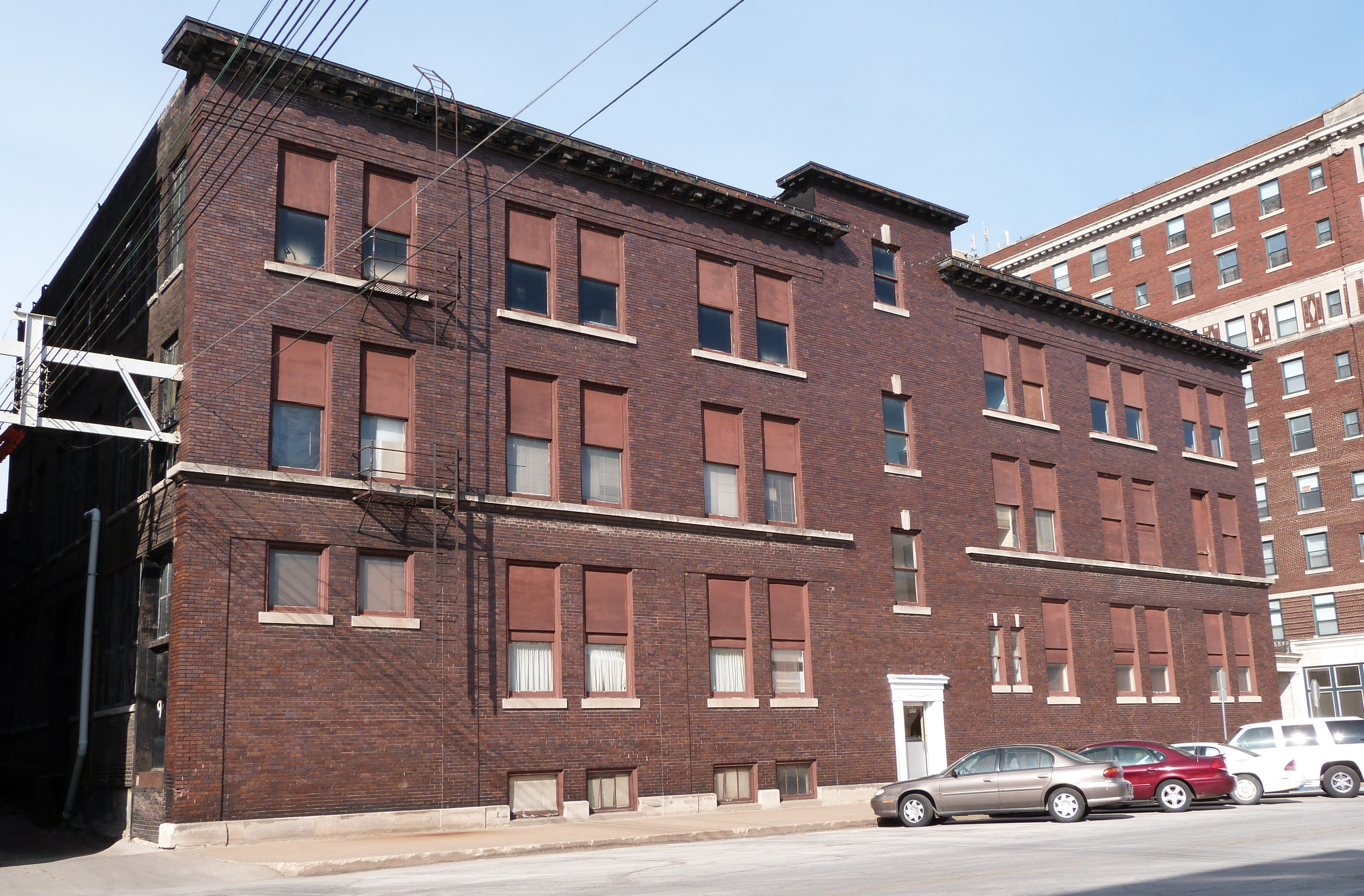
Schramm and Schmieg Wholesale Dry Goods (1908)

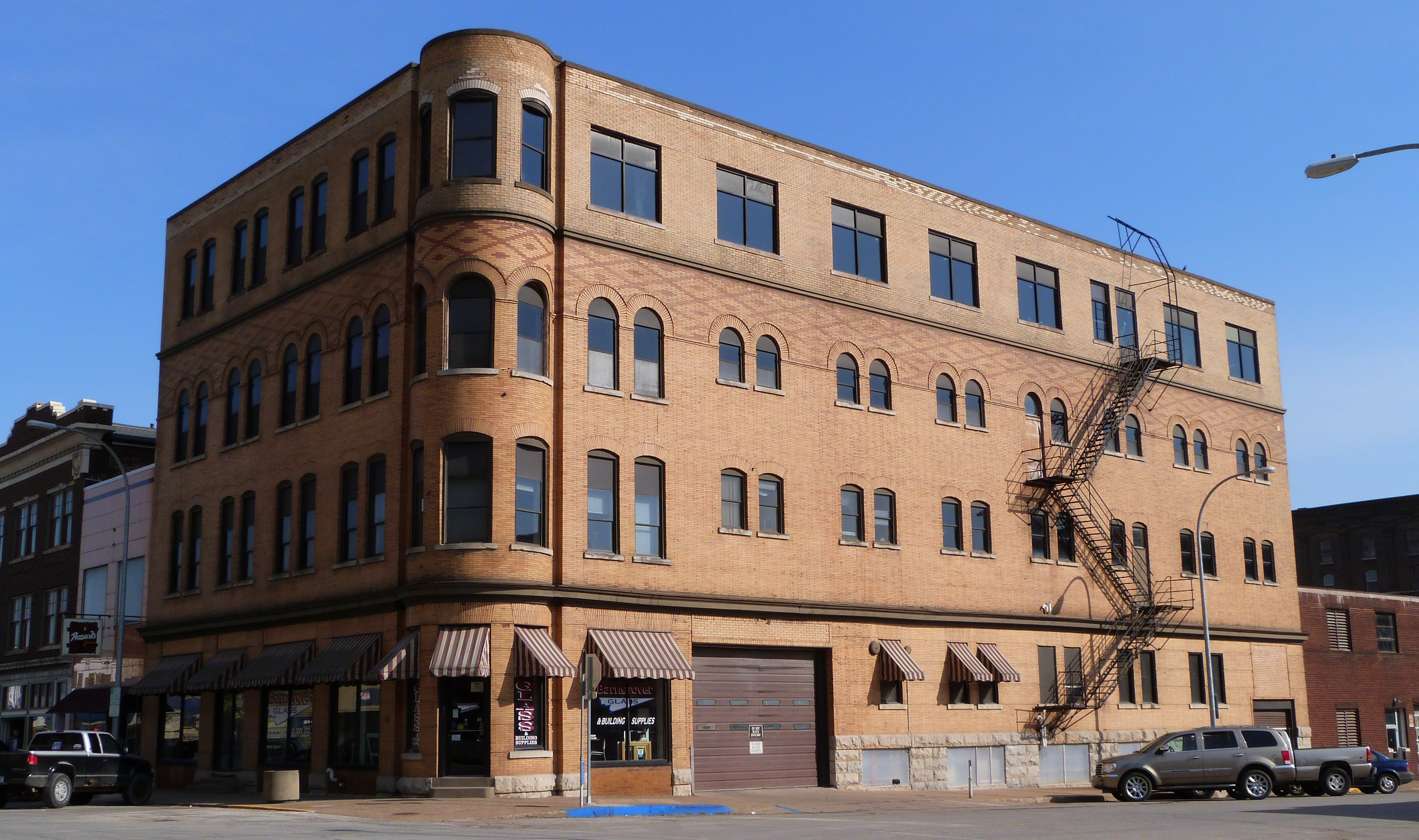
F.L. and G.L. Unterkircher Mortuary (1892)

== See also ==
- National Register of Historic Places listings in Des Moines County, Iowa
- Media related to Manufacturing and Wholesale Historic District at Wikimedia Commons
