= Lagomarcino-Grupe Company =

- U.S. National Register of Historic Places
- U.S. Historic district – Contributing property
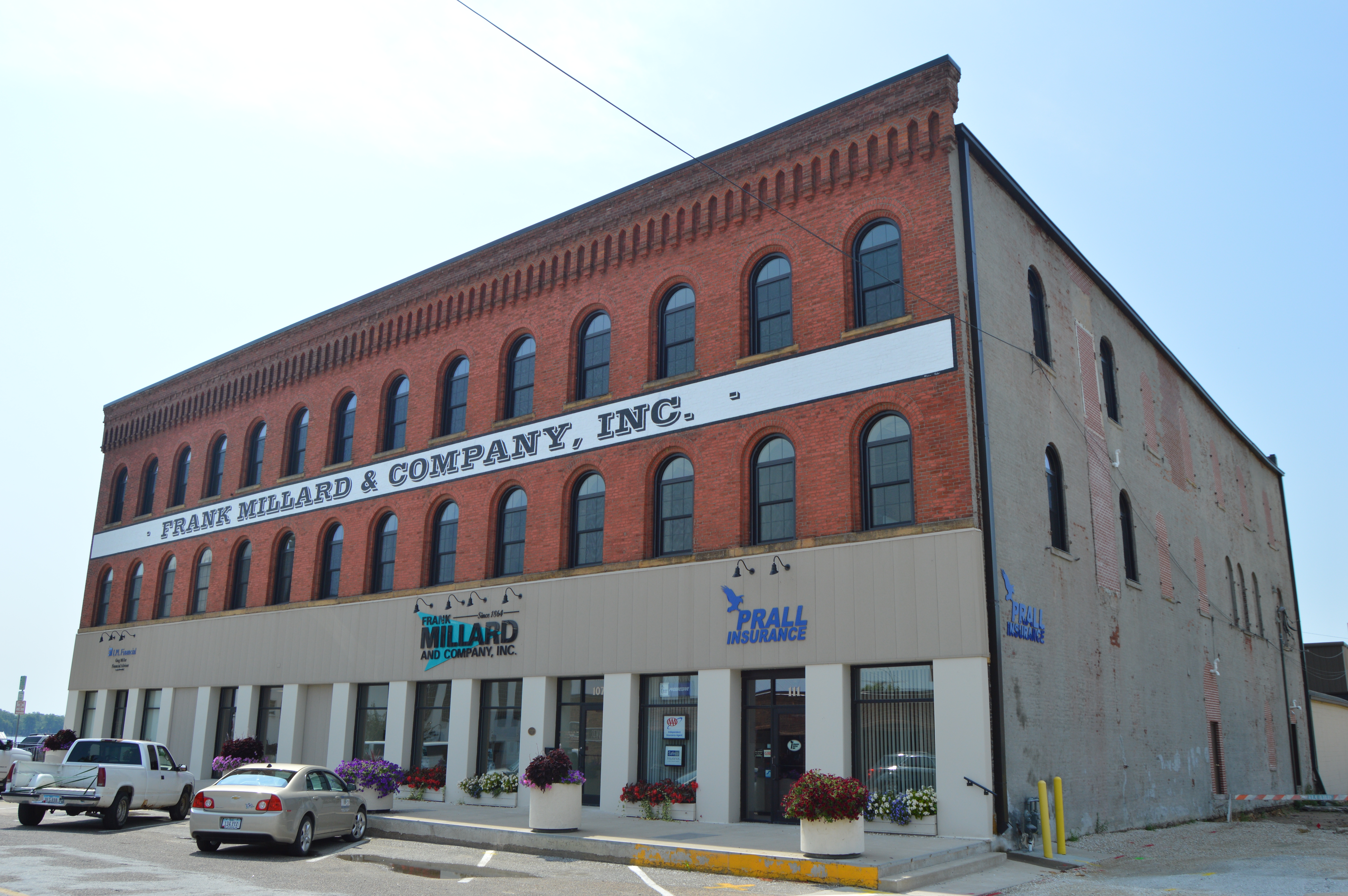

- Location within Iowa Location within the United States
- Location: 101-111 Valley St. Burlington, Iowa
- Coordinates: 40°48′31″N 91°06′04″W
- Area: less than one acre
- Built: 1868
- Architectural style: Renaissance Revival
- Part of: Downtown Commercial Historic District (ID14001168)
- NRHP reference No.: 13000796
- Added to NRHP: September 30, 2013

Lagomarcino-Grupe Company, also known as Rand & Coolbaugh's Block, is a historic building located in the central business district of Burlington, Iowa, United States. It was individually listed on the National Register of Historic Places in 2013, and it was included as a contributing property in the Downtown Commercial Historic District in 2015.

The three-story, brick commercial building was constructed in 1868 in the Renaissance Revival style. The main facade is 14 bays wide with a round arch window in each bay on the top two floors. Brick corbelling is located at the cornice level. The first floor was originally divided into four commercial spaces. Rand & Coolbaugh's Block refers to the structure's original owners. The buildings has had a variety of tenants including spirit's wholesalers, cigar manufacturing, ice cream saloon, haberdasher, dry goods, a printer, and a freight line. Hotel rooms for the Hotel Duncan across the alley were located on the upper floors for a time. The building has long been associated with the Lagomarcino-Grupe Company from 1892 to 1964. The wholesale fruit business was established in Burlington in 1875 and moved into the east half of the building in 1892. By 1907 they both owned and occupied the whole building. Lagomarcino-Grupe expanded to ten locations, but Burlington remained the main location. They also expanded into soda fountains and supplies, began manufacturing ice cream, and by the 1950s they were distributing Budweiser in Burlington. In 1964 they consolidated with the Benner Tea Company, and vacated this building two years later. Lagomarcino-Grupe sold the building to Benner in 1970, who then sold it to George Coffin the same year. The building has subsequently housed other businesses.
