= Schramm Building =

- U.S. National Register of Historic Places
- U.S. Historic district – Contributing property
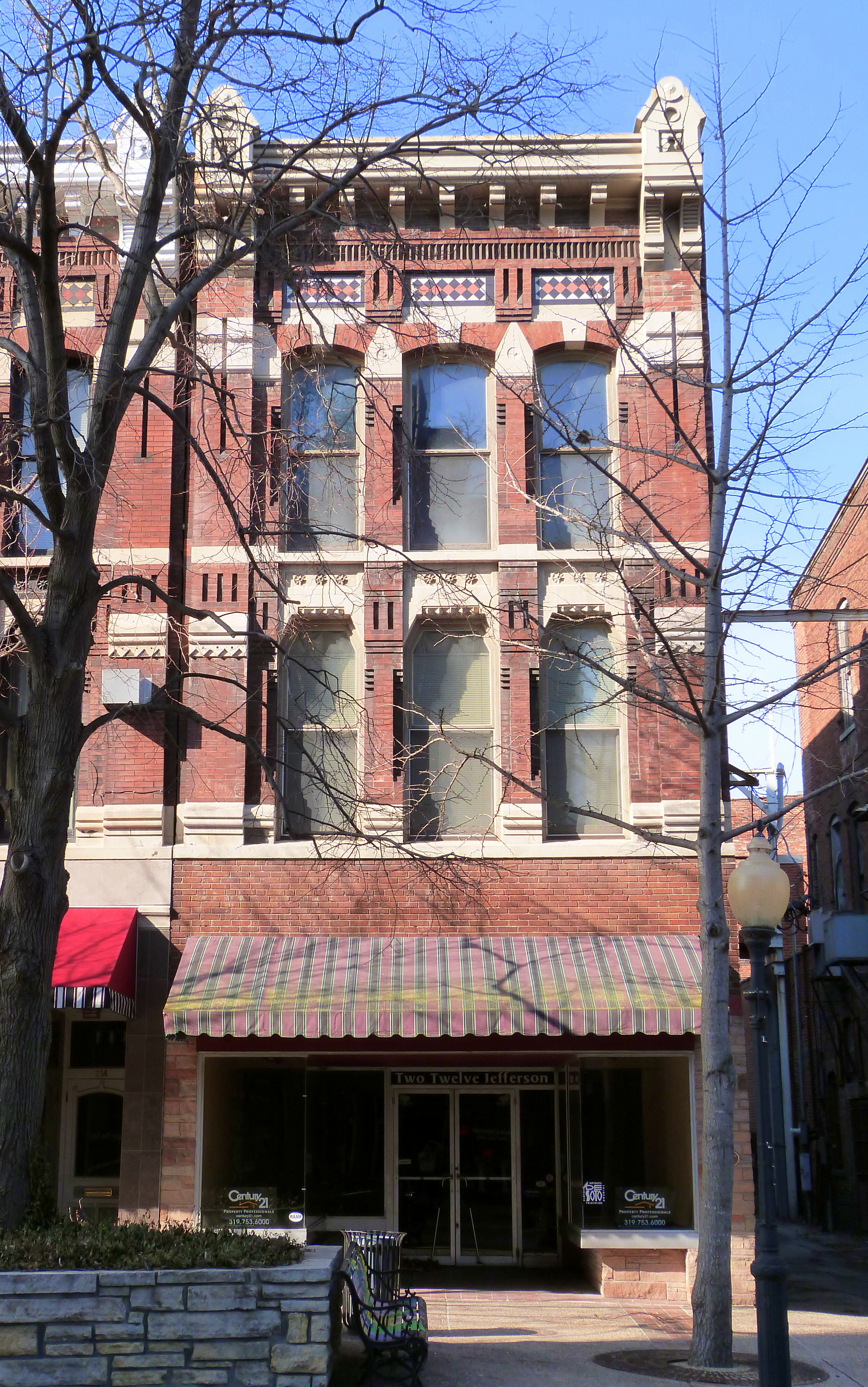

- Location within Iowa Location within the United States
- Location: 212 Jefferson St. Burlington, Iowa
- Coordinates: 40°48′36″N 91°06′07″W
- Area: less than one acre
- Built: 1878
- Architectural style: Late Victorian Gothic Revival
- Part of: Downtown Commercial Historic District (ID14001168)
- NRHP reference No.: 99000310
- Added to NRHP: March 12, 1999

Schramm Building, also known as Jochims Building, is a historic building located in the central business district of Burlington, Iowa, United States. It was individually listed on the National Register of Historic Places in 1999, and it was included as a contributing property in the Downtown Commercial Historic District in 2015.

The brick commercial building was constructed in 1878 in a Late Victorian Gothic Revival style. It is a three-story structure for the front 68 feet (21 m) and then two-story from that point to the rear of the building. An ornamental cornice tops the facade, and each of the front windows feature ornamental trim. The building next door (214 Jefferson Street) has a twin facade to this building. This building housed the first dry-goods millinery store in Burlington. A mesh concrete veneer was placed over the facade in the late 1950s. The storefront on the main level was altered in the 1960s. In the 1970s it was part of a complex of six buildings that housed the J.S. Schramm Department Store. The building was extensively renovated in 1995. The facade was restored, and the second floor was renovated to create an apartment.
