= Jagger–Churchill House =

Historic house in Iowa, United States

- U.S. National Register of Historic Places
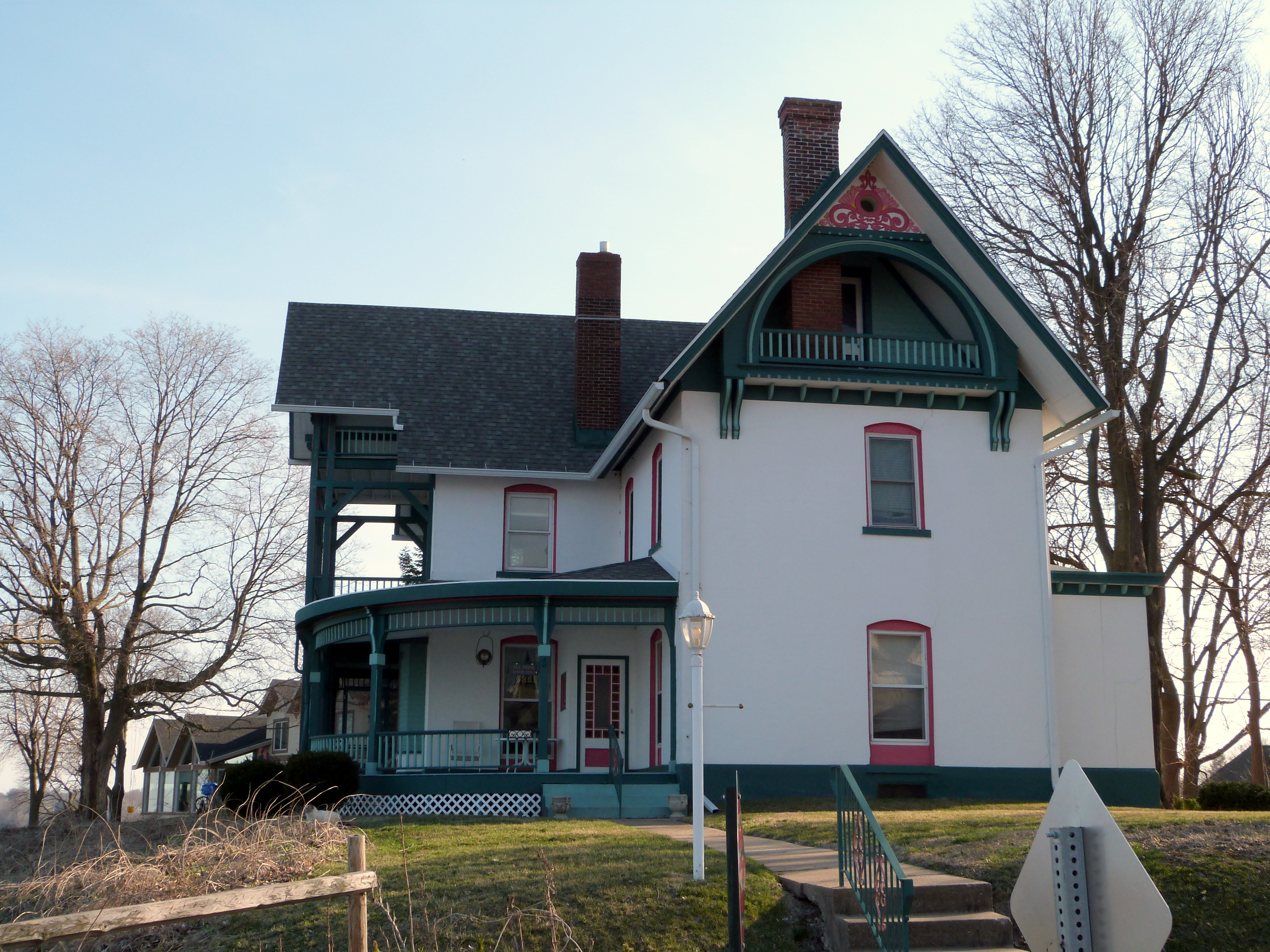

- Location within Iowa Location within the United States
- Location: 201 Spring St. Burlington, Iowa
- Coordinates: 40°48′55″N 91°06′00″W
- Area: 1 acre (0.40 ha)
- Built: 1853
- Architectural style: Victorian
- NRHP reference No.: 82002616
- Added to NRHP: March 5, 1982

The Jagger–Churchill House is a historic building located in Burlington, Iowa, United States. It was listed on the National Register of Historic Places in 1982. This house is representative of those built by Burlington's wealthier citizens when the city was one of Iowa's major commercial centers in the late 19th and early 20th centuries. Erasmus D. Jaggar, who had the house built, ran a successful linseed oil business. He and his wife Julia raised their five children here. Francis and Catherine W. Churchill bought the house from the Jaggar heirs in 1889. He founded the Churchill Drug Company, which became one of the largest wholesale drug firms in the Midwest by the time of his death in 1896. The house remained in the Churchill family until 1935. The structure does not exhibit any one architectural style, but is a combination of elements of the Gothic Revival, Italianate, Queen Anne, and Eastlake styles.
