= James M. Forney House =

Historic house in Iowa, United States

- U.S. National Register of Historic Places
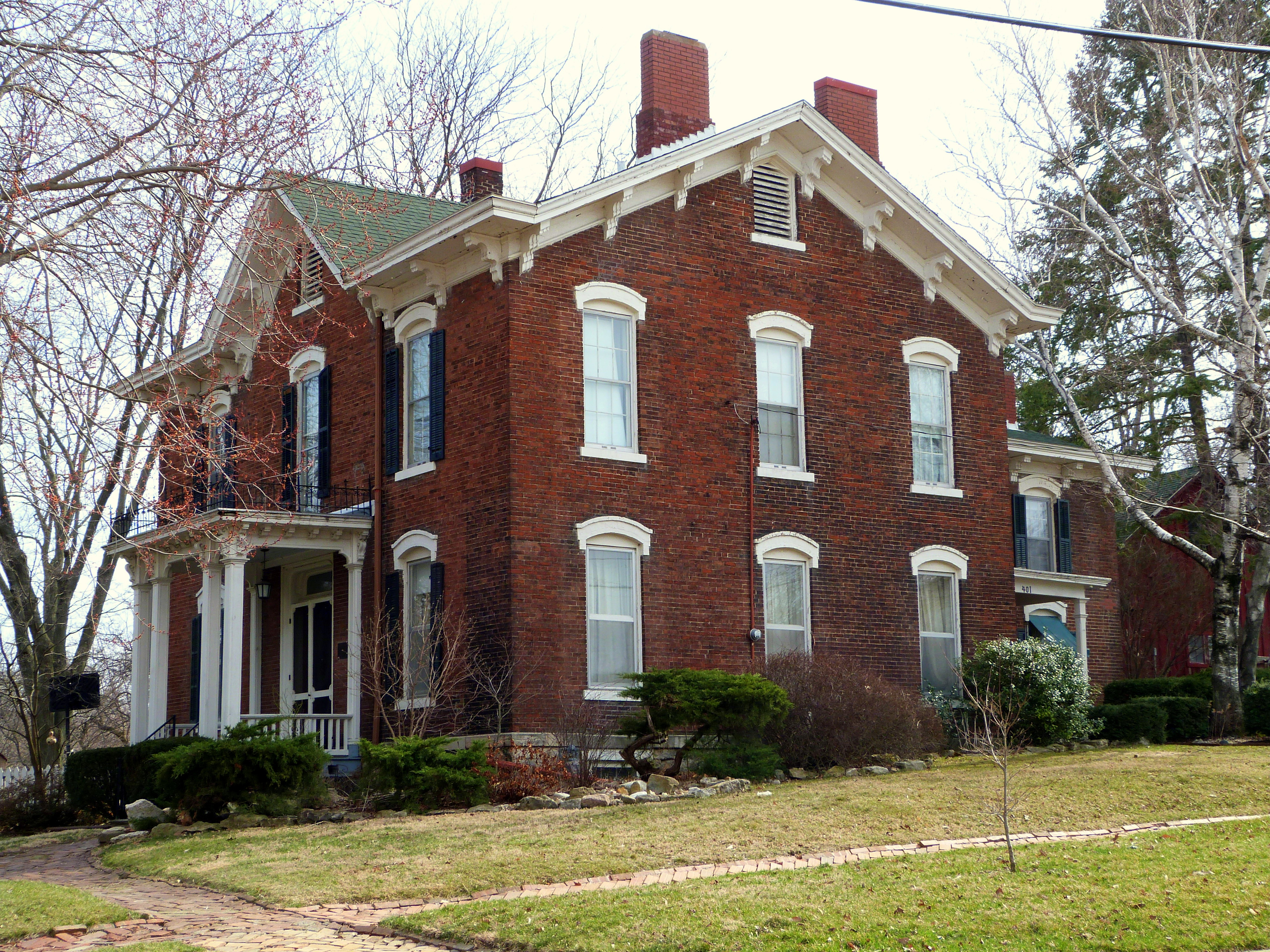

- Location within Iowa Location within the United States
- Location: 401 Cedar St. Burlington, Iowa
- Coordinates: 40°48′02″N 91°06′13″W
- Area: less than one acre
- Built: 1864
- Built by: Aimeon Russell
- Architectural style: Gothic Revival; Italianate
- NRHP reference No.: 86002689
- Added to NRHP: September 22, 1986

The James M. Forney House is a historic building located in Burlington, Iowa, United States. It was listed on the National Register of Historic Places in 1986. Forney was a cabinet maker in Pennsylvania who came to Burlington in 1850 and opened a saw mill. By 1857 he sold his business to his competitors and entered into a partnership with his brother-in-law, Samuel Mellinger, in a tin and coopersmith firm. By 1866 he put his wealth into real estate. In 1875 Forney started another commercial venture with M. C. Buffington, the inventor and patent holder for the Improved Sarven Wheel, also known as the Buffington Wheel. They formed a partnership and opened Buffington, Forney & Company, a carriage wheel manufacturer. They patented and manufactured the Universal Wheelwright Machine, which was considered the finest wheel making machine in the world.

The 2½ story, brick house is located on property that encompasses a half block at the top of a bluff. It features Italianate influences found in the main block, the roof line, and ornamental details. They are combined with the Gothic Revival influences found in the central cross gable, the pointed arch windows in the gables, and the tracery between the columns of the front porch.
