= Mary Darwin House =

Historic house in Iowa, United States

- U.S. National Register of Historic Places
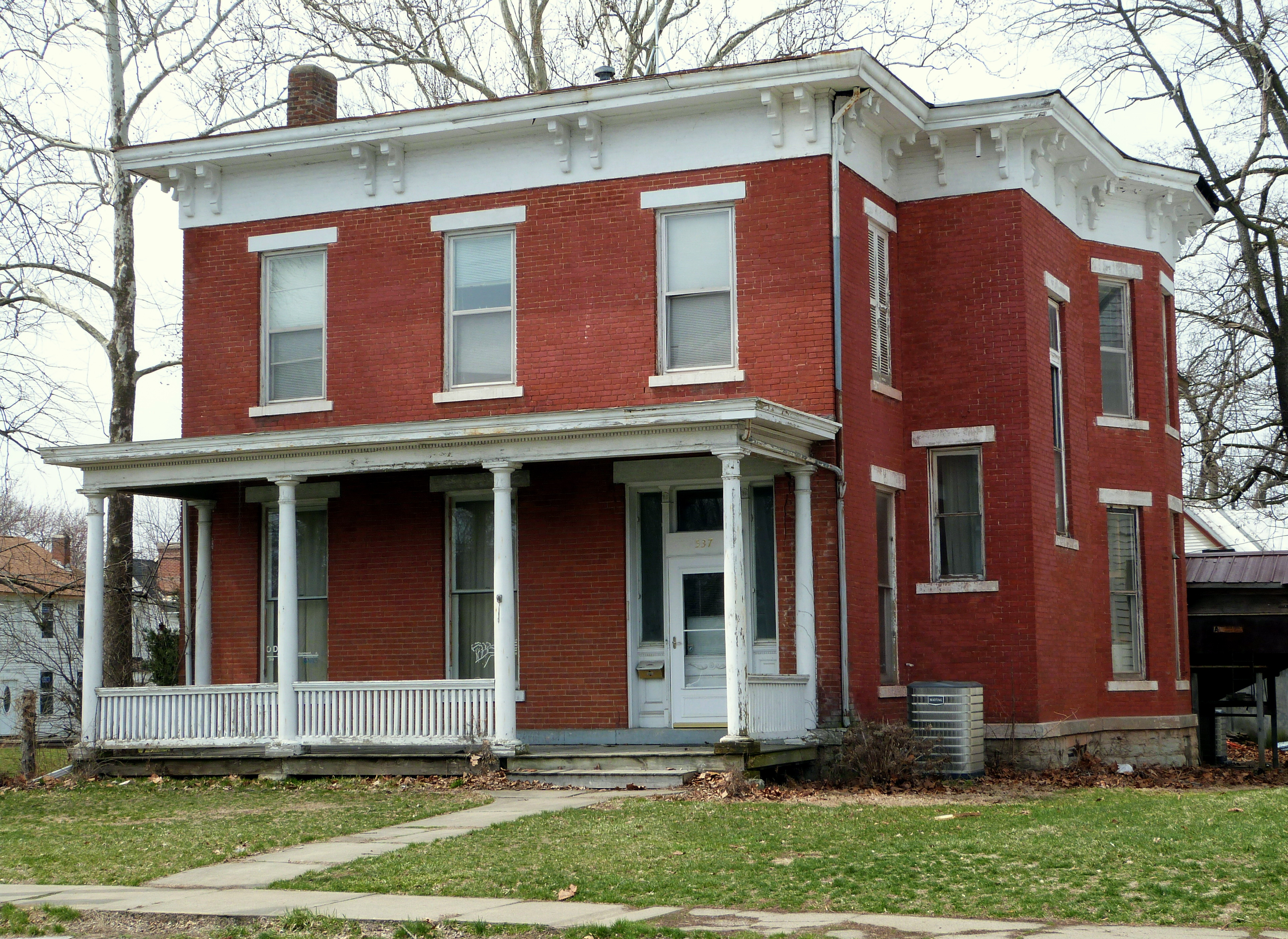

- Location within Iowa Location within the United States
- Location: 537 Summer St., Burlington, Iowa
- Coordinates: 40°48′06″N 91°06′51″W
- Area: less than one acre
- Built: 1866
- Architectural style: Vernacular Italianate
- NRHP reference No.: 80001445
- Added to NRHP: January 24, 1980

The Mary Darwin House is a historic house located at 537 Summer Street in Burlington, Iowa. It was listed on the National Register of Historic Places on January 24, 1980.

== Description and history ==
This house served as the residence of Mary Abigail Platt Darwin from 1866 to 1886. Darwin was major figure in the Women's suffrage movement in Iowa in the late 19th century. She and her husband, Charles Ben Darwin, resided together in Burlington from 1851 until he left for Washington state in 1870. They later divorced. That same year Mary Darwin chaired the first meeting of the executive committee of the Iowa Woman's Suffrage Association. She became a popular speaker on the subject throughout the state, but she was eventually shut out of the statewide movement because of her more liberal attitudes on such topics as free love. After living in Washington, D.C. from 1876 to 1880 she returned to Burlington and became involved with the Woman's Christian Temperance Union on both the local and state levels.

The house is a brick structure in a vernacular Italianate style. It is composed of a two-story main block that is three bays wide, and a projecting full-sized projection with a polygonal bay on the north side. The whole structure is built on a limestone foundation. The house features shallow hipped roofs; wide, bracketed eaves; brick friezes that are painted white; and two wooden verandas.
