= Hotel Burlington =

- U.S. National Register of Historic Places
- U.S. Historic district – Contributing property
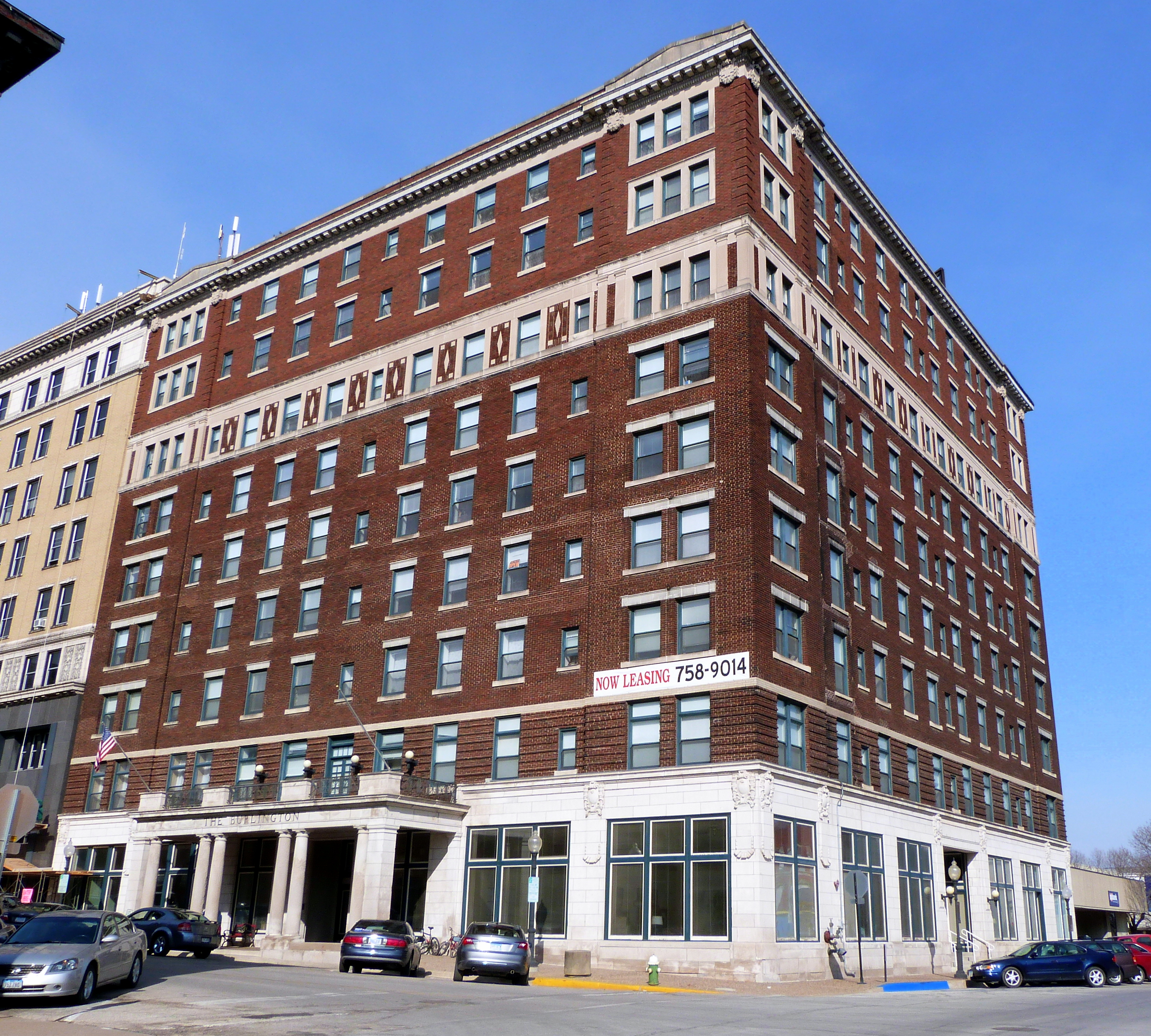

- Location within Iowa Location within the United States
- Location: 206 N. 3rd St. Burlington, Iowa
- Coordinates: 40°48′33″N 91°06′09″W
- Area: less than one acre
- Built: 1911, 1923, 1931
- Built by: West Lake Construction Co,
- Architect: Seth E. Temple; Parke T. Burrows
- Architectural style: Renaissance Revival
- Part of: Downtown Commercial Historic District (ID14001168)
- NRHP reference No.: 87002214
- Added to NRHP: December 31, 1987

Hotel Burlington, now known as The Burlington Apartments, is a historic building located in the central business district of Burlington, Iowa, United States. It was individually listed on the National Register of Historic Places in 1987, and it was included as a contributing property in the Downtown Commercial Historic District in 2015.

At the turn of the 20th-century Burlington had grown into a manufacturing town and a center for commercial travelers. In order to remain a leading commercial city in the state, the businessmen in the community saw a need for a quality hotel. They banded together and raised the $350,000 required for construction of the Hotel Burlington to serve the city's business, convention and tourist needs. Davenport architects Seth E. Temple and Parke T. Burrows designed the original seven-story L-shaped Renaissance Revival structure. It opened on February 6, 1911, with 125 guest rooms. All of the rooms had telephones and running water, and most of them had a private bath. An electric sign was placed on top of the building so that it was visible from the nearby train station.

The hotel proved so successful that a new $100,000 wing was added in 1923, in the rear, on the eastern side, giving the structure its current U-shaped form. Two more floors were added on top in 1931, at a cost of $300,000, bringing the structure to nine stories. In both instances the local businessmen funded the expansion. The hotel remained in operation with several different owners until 1980 when it went into receivership. The building was subsequently converted into an apartment building.
