= Chittenden & Eastman Company =

American mattress manufacturer

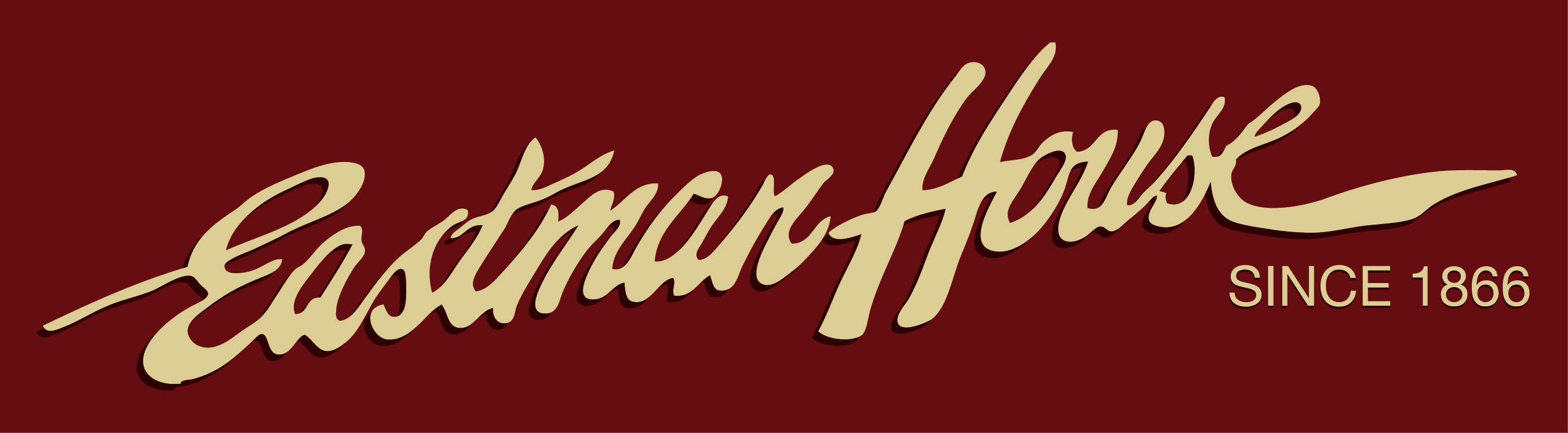
- Logo used since 1866
- Industry: Manufacturing
- Founded: 1866; Burlington, Iowa
- Founder: G.M. Todd; H. Bailey
- Successor: Eastman House
- Headquarters: North Brunswick, New Jersey, United States
- Area served: Worldwide
- Key people: Stuart Carlitz (CEO); Matthew Connolly (President)
- Products: Mattresses
- Services: Complete Line Mattress Manufacturer
- Divisions: Eastman House
- Website: eastmanhousemattress.com

Chittenden & Eastman Company (established in 1866) is an American handcrafting mattress manufacturer originally based in Burlington, Iowa. The company has thirty factories around the world and is currently headquartered in North Brunswick, New Jersey. Chittenden & Eastman's intellectual property has since been purchased by Mattress Development Company of Delaware which reintroduced the Eastman House brand into the marketplace. The company is active with over 30 factories and licensees worldwide.

== Company history ==
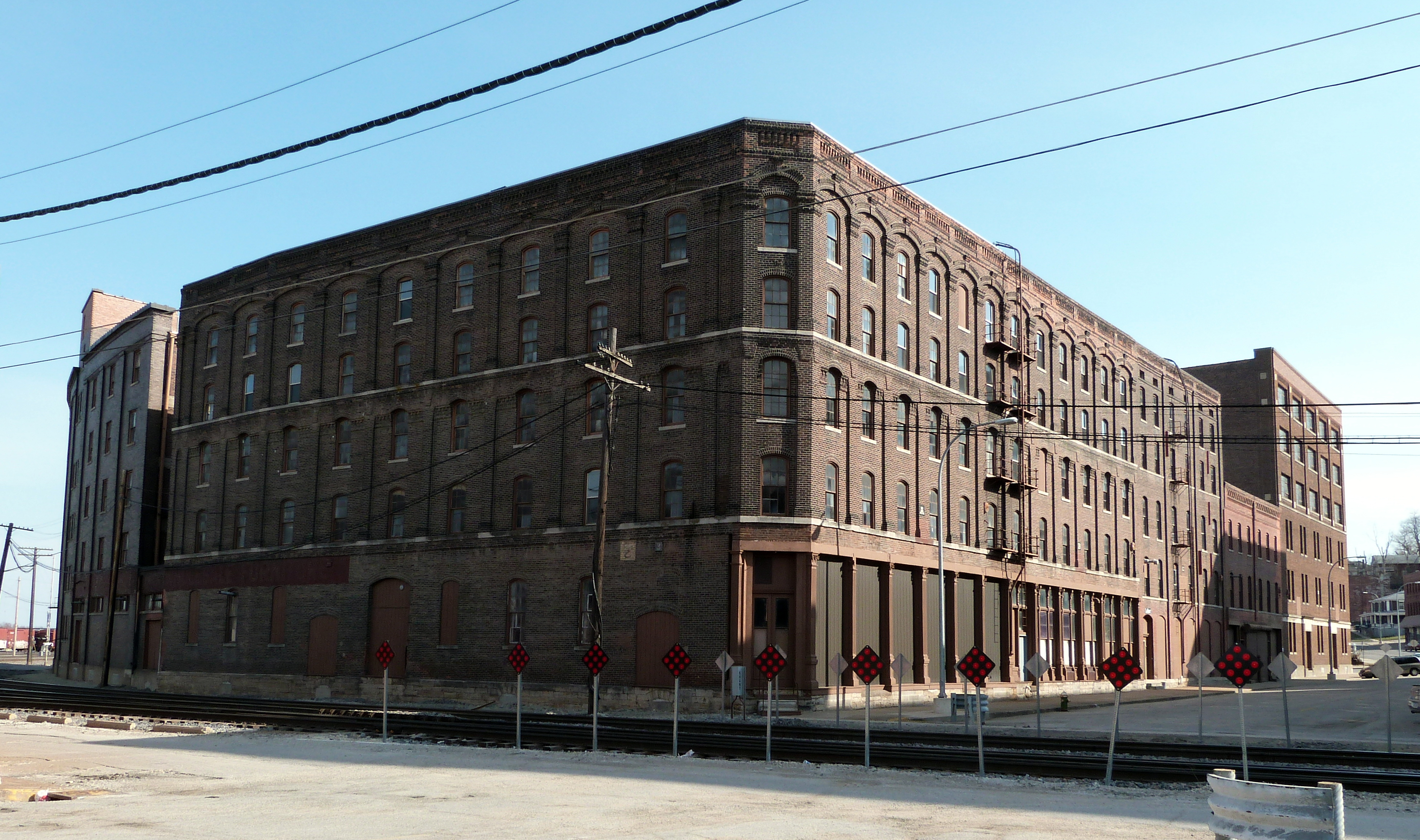
Chittenden & Eastman Company Building Burlington Iowa

Chittenden & Eastman Company was founded by G.M. Todd and H. Bailey in 1866. In 1972, the company moved its mattress manufacturing operations to a 90,000 sq ft (8,400 m^{2}) facility at Roosevelt Avenue; 170,000 sq ft (16,000 m^{2}) was added in 1975.

C&E expanded its business to New York and New England markets in 1993. The following year, it acquired Aireloom Bedding. In 1995, C&E signed to manufacturer Dormir Sleep Products.

In 2003, Chittenden & Eastman relocated production to Missouri. However, in 2007, their intellectual property was purchased by Mattress Development Company of Delaware which reintroduced the Eastman House brand into the marketplace. In 2008, Eastman House Company added Houston-based Sanitary Mattress as a licensee. Eastman House Company added Australia based company A.H. Beard as a licensee in 2009. It added Canada based company Vogue Bedding as a licensee in 2011.

In 2014, Matthew Connolly was appointed as president of the company. Eclipse and Eastman House mattress brand entered Guatemala in March 2015, and in April, Saudi Arabia's Almutlaq Group licensed Eastman House Mattress Brand. Also in April, Spears family of Heritage Sleep Products open new plant selling Eastman House and Eclipse mattresses. The same year, Illinois Sleep Products agreed to produce mattresses under Eastman House mattress brands. The same year, Eastman House Company donated mattresses for the Pope Francis entourage to Philadelphia.

== International presence ==
Eastman House has licensees in:

- Australia
- Bahrain
- Brazil
- Canada
- China
- Egypt
- Guatemala
- India
- Indonesia
- Iraq
- Jordan
- Korea
- Kuwait
- Lebanon
- Malaysia
- New Zealand
- Oman
- Pakistan
- Philippines
- Qatar
- Russia
- Saudi Arabia
- Singapore
- Syria
- Taiwan
- Thailand
- Türkiye
- Ukraine
- United Arab Emirates
- United States
- Vietnam
- Yemen
