= Prairie Grove School (Des Moines County, Iowa) =

- U.S. National Register of Historic Places
- Location within Iowa Location within the United States
- Location: 13598 Beaverdale Rd.
- Nearest city: West Burlington, Iowa
- Coordinates: 40°52′49.3″N 91°14′55.8″W
- Area: less than one acre
- Built: 1879
- Built by: Arch McCormick (addition)
- NRHP reference No.: 100003973
- Added to NRHP: May 20, 2019

Prairie Grove School is a historic building located northwest of West Burlington in rural Des Moines County, Iowa, United States. This was the third school building for Prairie Grove. The first was a log structure known as Cockayne School and was located in what is now the cemetery. The second school building was a red brick structure located on the same property, acquired in 1849, as the subject building. It was replaced by the present stone structure in 1879. Surplus money from the teacher's fund and the sale of the old building provided the funds for construction. The stone was quarried locally. A wood-frame addition was built onto the front of the building in 1924 by Arch McCormick. The cupola and bell were added at the same time. In 1874 the school had 58 students and by 1936 that number was reduced to 10. It remained in operation until 1960. The building was deeded to the cemetery association the following year. It was listed on the National Register of Historic Places in 2019.
