= Dennis Melcher Pottery and House =

Historic house in Iowa, United States

- U.S. National Register of Historic Places
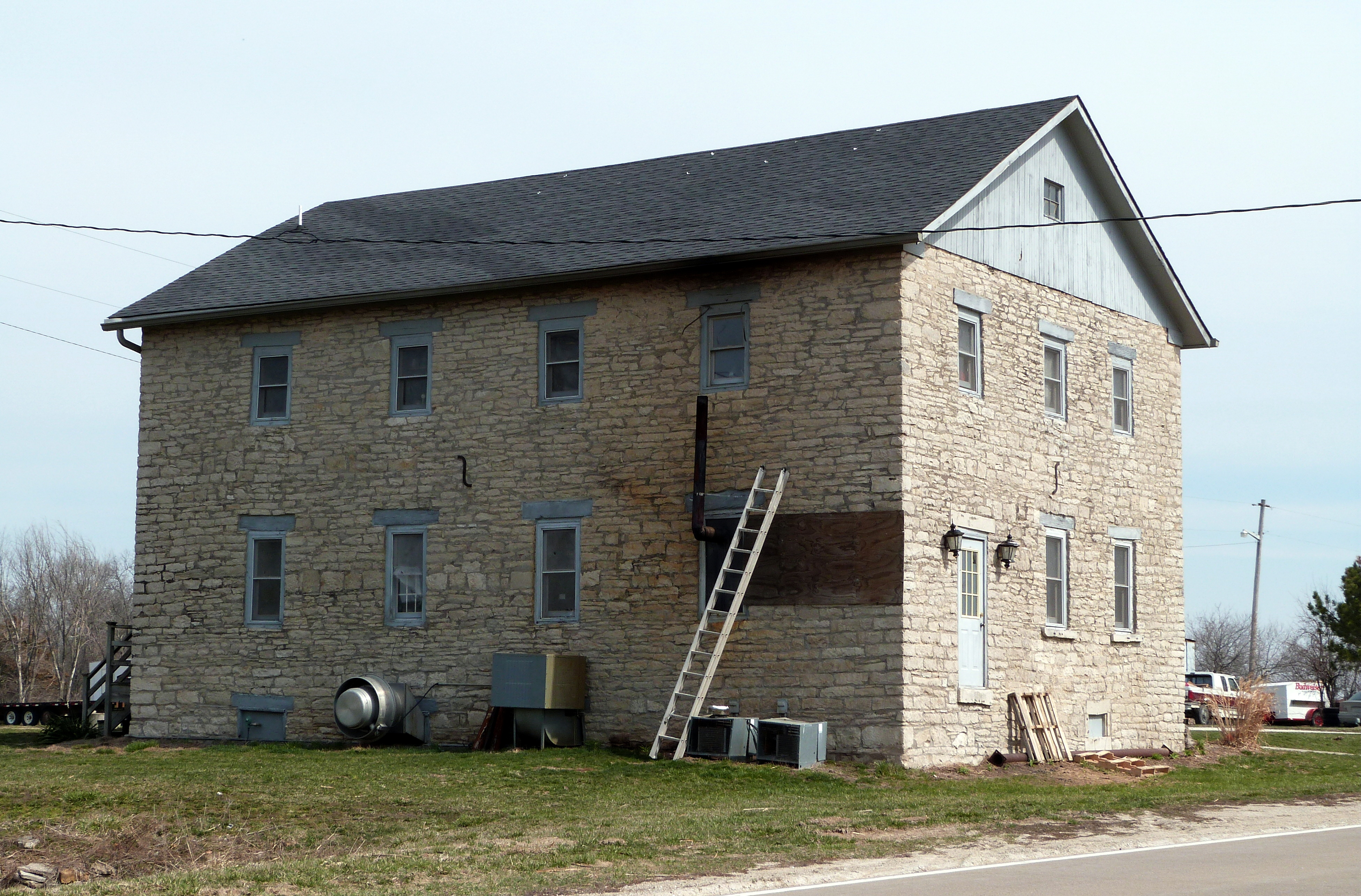
- The Dennis Melcher Pottery in 2013.

- Location within Iowa Location within the United States
- Location: 22981 and 22982 Agency Rd. Danville, Iowa
- Coordinates: 40°48′58″N 91°22′18″W
- Built: 1842
- Architectural style: Italianate
- NRHP reference No.: 03000832
- Added to NRHP: August 28, 2003

The Dennis Melcher Pottery and House are historic structures located southwest of Danville, Iowa, United States. Dennis Melcher and his brother Edward were both born in Baden, Germany and immigrated to Burlington, Iowa in the 1840s. Their father had been a potter in Germany and Dennis opened a pottery in Burlington in 1844. The Melcher's discovered a vein of clay near the Agency Road on the Des Moines County and Henry County line. Dennis bought 19.98 acres (0.0809 km^{2}) in Danville Township. He built a limestone building to house his business and a house across the road to house his family. He opened a pottery in 1851 and worked until he died in 1879. He produced crocks, churns, kitchen jugs, canning jars, bean pots, flower pots and possibly dinnerware. The buildings were listed on the National Register of Historic Places in 2003.
