= Hedge Block =

- U.S. National Register of Historic Places
- U.S. Historic district – Contributing property
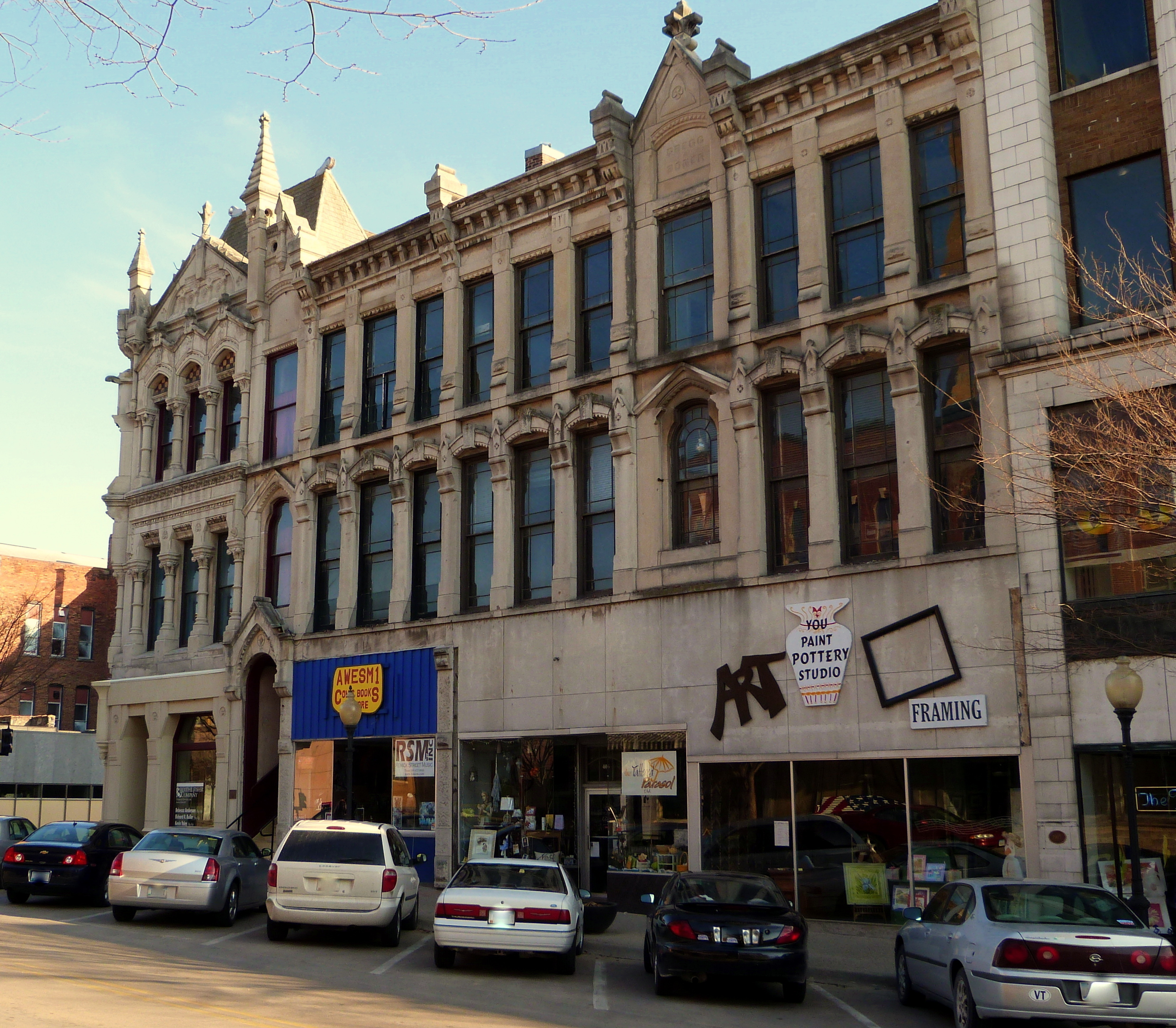

- Location within Iowa Location within the United States
- Location: 401-407 Jefferson St. Burlington, Iowa
- Coordinates: 40°48′36″N 91°06′15″W
- Area: less than one acre
- Built: 1880
- Architect: Charles A. Dunham
- Architectural style: Late Victorian Gothic Revival
- Part of: West Jefferson Street Historic District, Downtown Commercial Historic District (ID91000409, 14001168)
- NRHP reference No.: 82000405
- Added to NRHP: October 7, 1982

The Hedge Block, also known as Johnson-Rasmussen Building, is a historic commercial building located in the central business district of Burlington, Iowa, United States. It was individually listed on the National Register of Historic Places in 1982. It was included as a contributing property in the West Jefferson Street Historic District in 1991 and in the Downtown Commercial Historic District in 2015.

The brick commercial building was constructed in 1880 in the Late Victorian Gothic Revival style. It is a three-story structure with a limestone facade on Jefferson Street, brick along Fourth Street, and a chamfered corner that joins the two elevations. The Jefferson street facade is livelier with short towers, pilasters between the widows, and Gothic arched hoods over tall, narrow windows. The Fourth Street facade is flatter, with wider windows and stone used for the keystones, hood molds, imposts, window sills, small columns and belt courses. The building was built as an investment by local businessmen Thomas Hedge, Sr., E.H. Carpenter, John M. Gregg, and Wesley Bonar. They hired Burlington architect Charles A. Dunham to design the building. Three of the men who built the building owned one of three 20-foot (6.1 m) frontages and one owned the 27-foot (8.2 m) corner frontage. A variety of businesses occupied the building over the years, with the Orchard City Business College, later called Elliott's Business College, occupying the second and third floors of the corner section for a time.
