= West Jefferson Street Historic District =

Historic district in Iowa, United States

- U.S. National Register of Historic Places
- U.S. Historic district
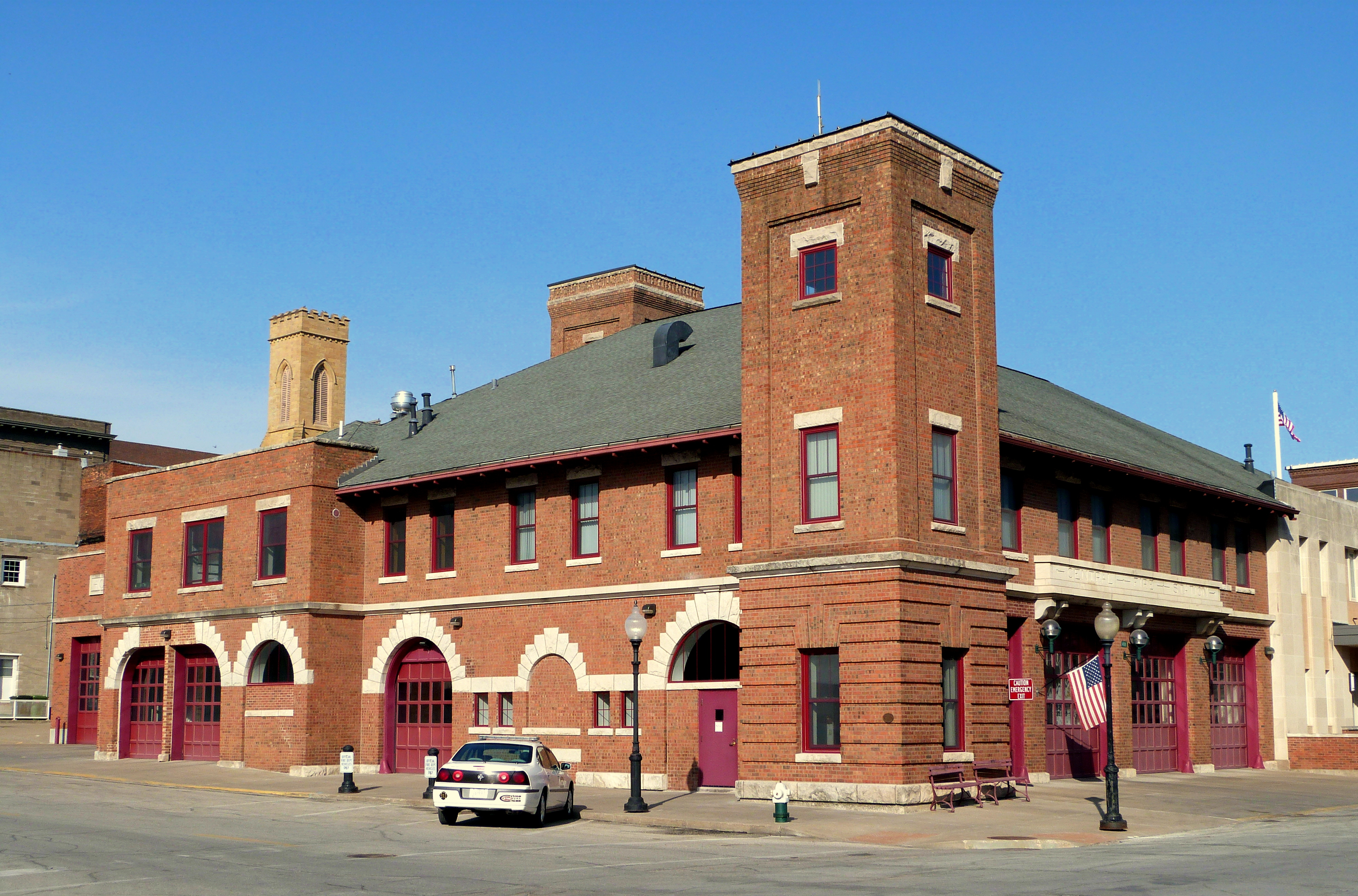
- Burlington Fire-Police Station in 2013.

- Location within Iowa Location within the United States
- Location: Roughly the 400 to 800 blocks of W. Jefferson St., Burlington, Iowa
- Coordinates: 40°40′38″N 91°06′22″W
- Area: 18.5 acres (7.5 ha)
- NRHP reference No.: 91000409
- Added to NRHP: April 9, 1991

The West Jefferson Street Historic District is five commercial blocks on the west side of downtown Burlington, Iowa, United States. It was listed on the National Register of Historic Places in 1982. In 2015 the area was included in the Downtown Commercial Historic District. West Jefferson Street was the main thoroughfare in the late 19th century and early 20th century through the Hawkeye Creek Valley. It led from the central business district along the Mississippi River to the Agency Road that headed westward out of town. The historic district is mostly made up of commercial buildings that range from single-story structures to four-story brick buildings, many of which have stone and terra cotta details. There is also a single frame building. A significant number of the structures are Italianate in style. The historic combined Fire and Police Station is also part of the district. At the time of its nomination there were 63 buildings in the district, of which 49 were contributing properties.

== Contributing properties ==
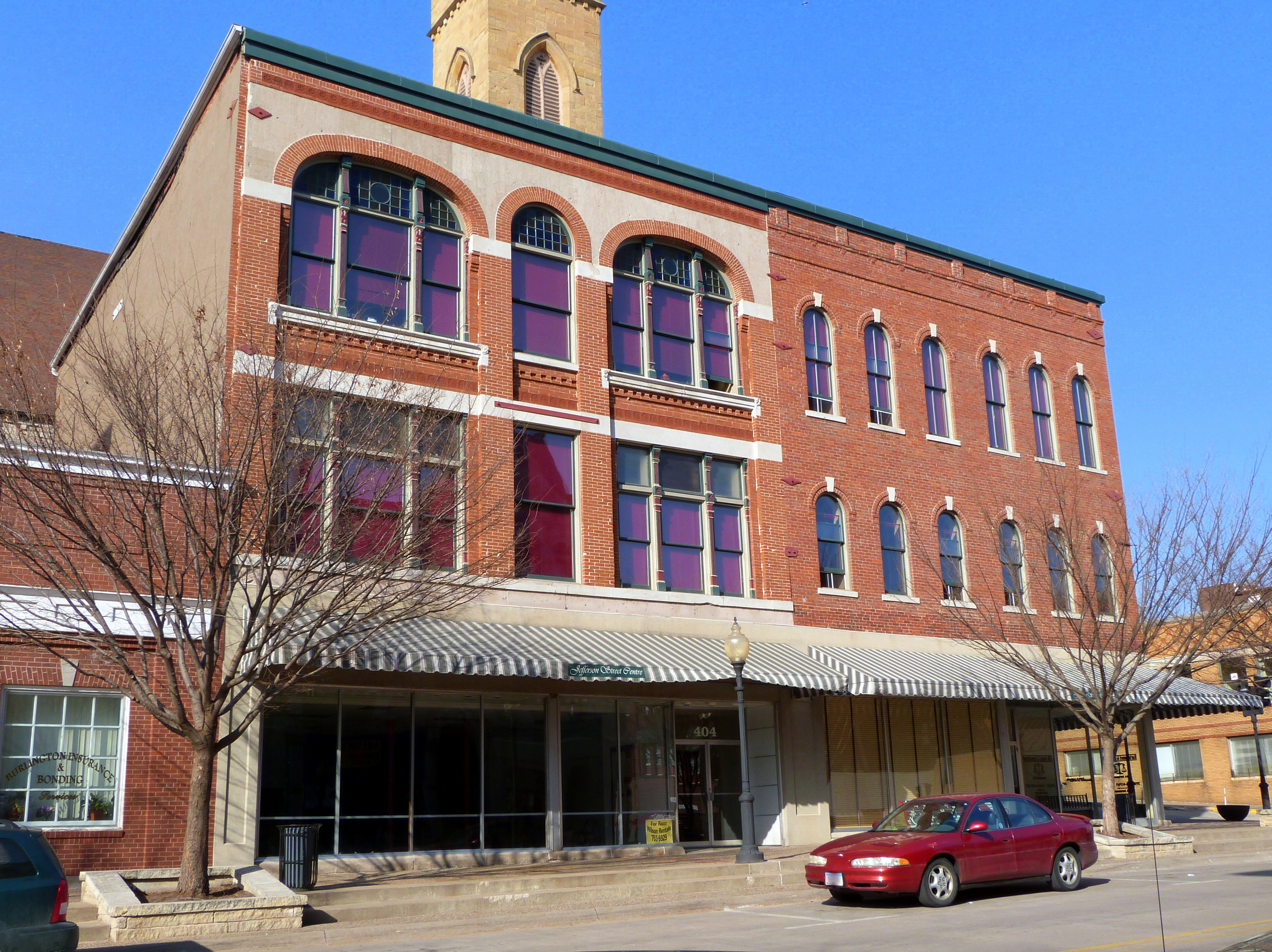
Lyman Cook Block (1883) Jones Block (1876)

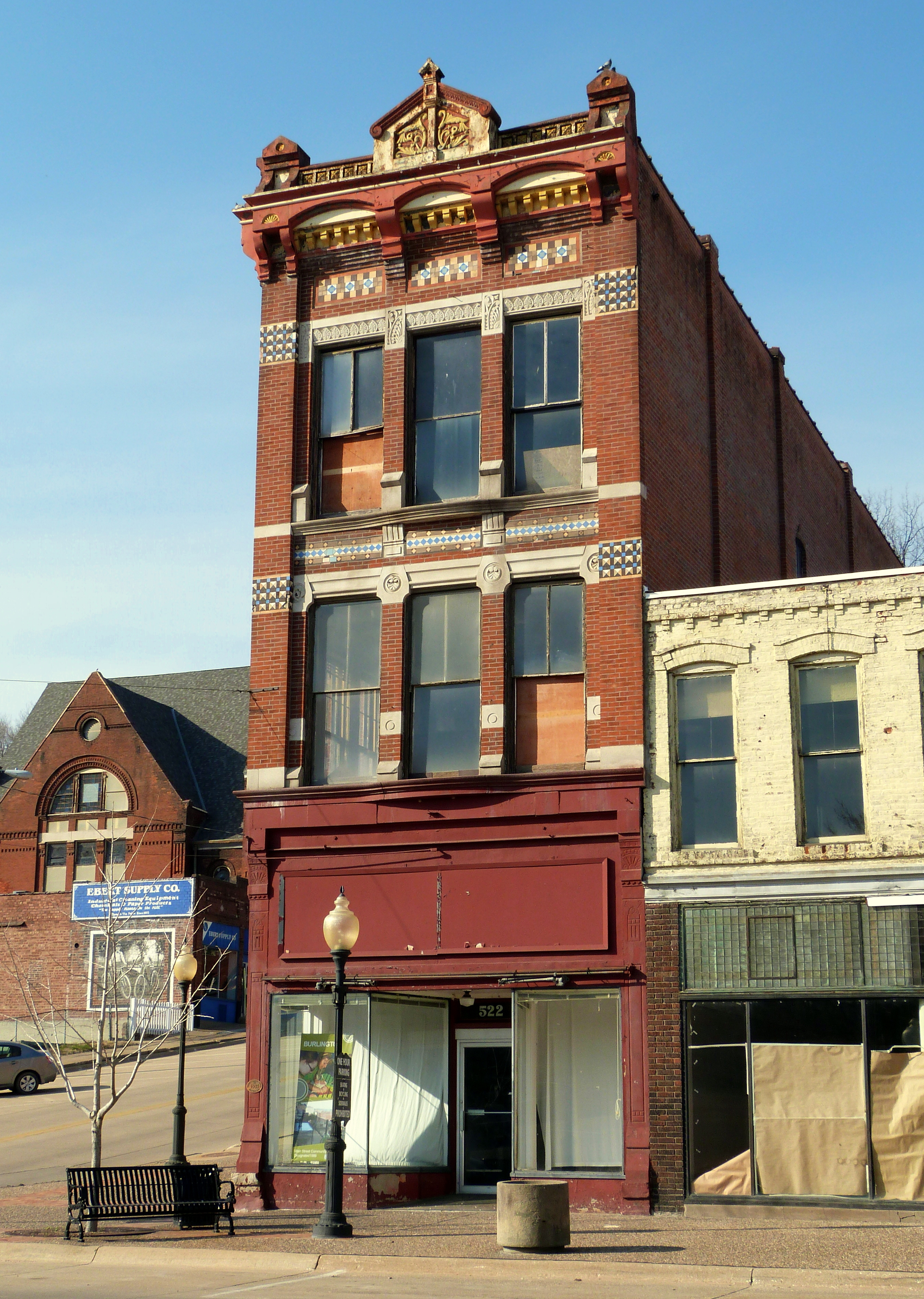
Forney & Mellinger Block (1883)

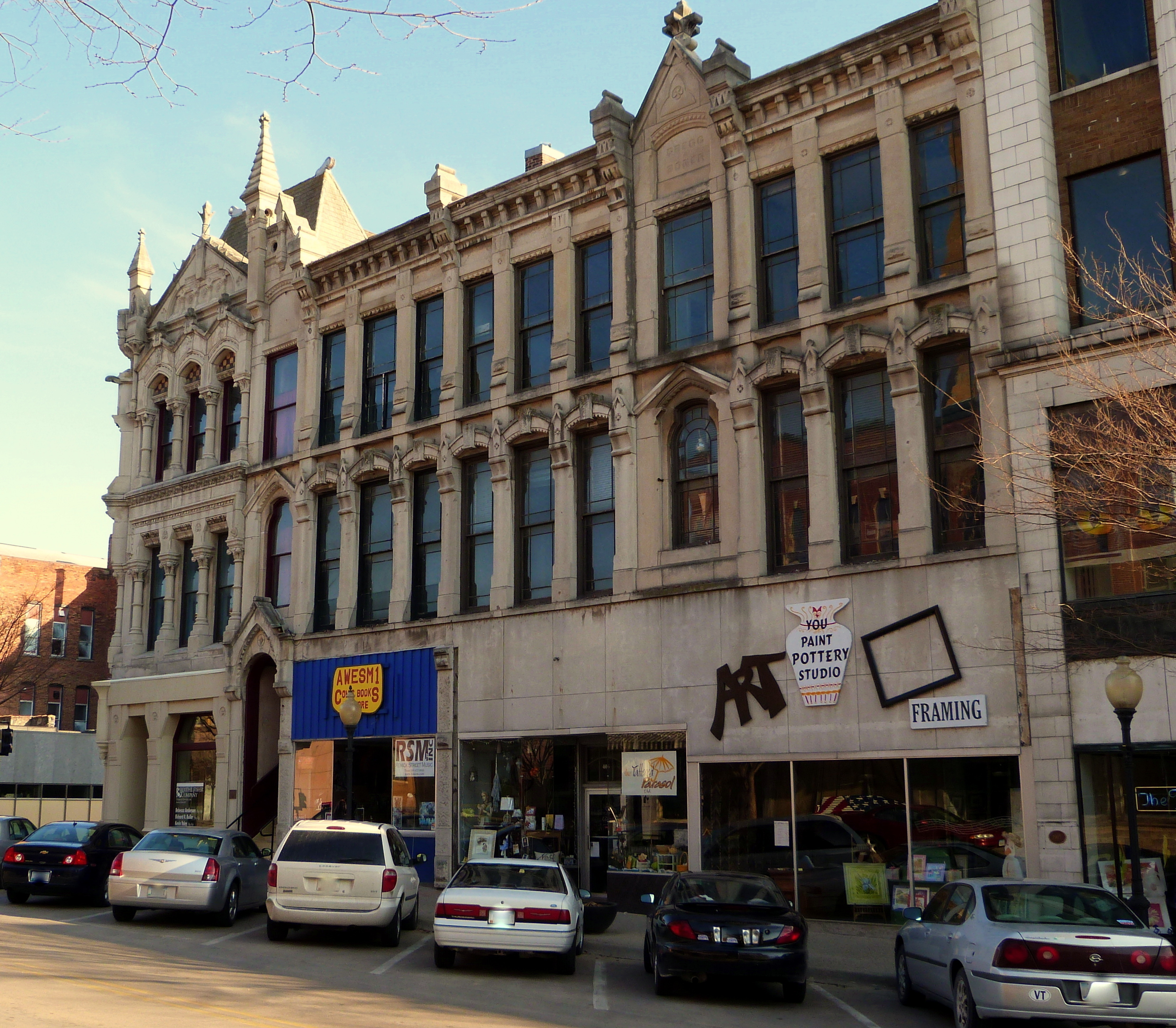
Hedge Block (1881)

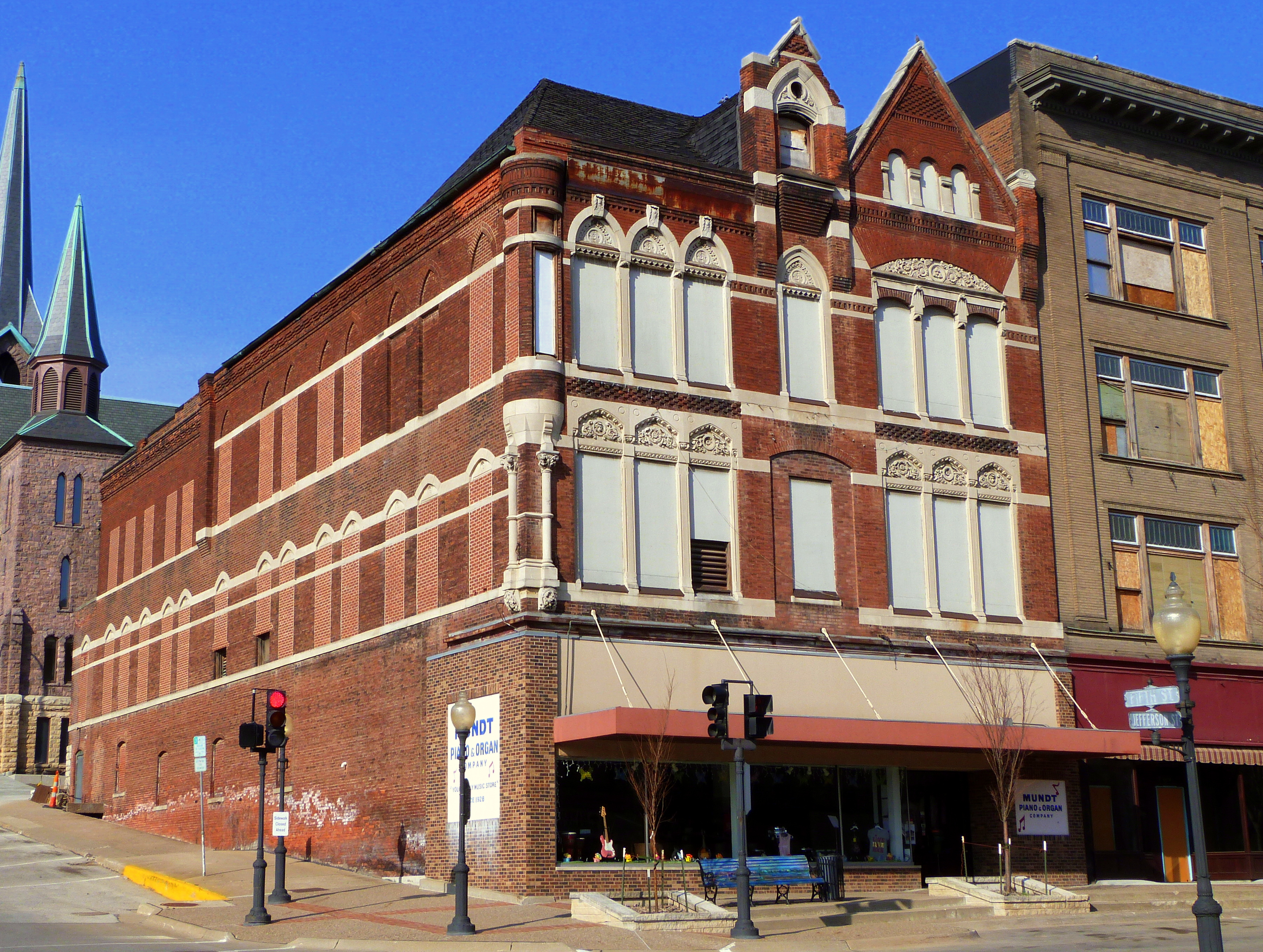
Masonic Temple-Gregg Building (1884)

== See also ==
- National Register of Historic Places listings in Des Moines County, Iowa
- Media related to West Jefferson Street Historic District at Wikimedia Commons
