= Iowa's 15th Senate district =

American legislative district

Iowa's 15th State Senate district
Senator
Tony Bisignano; D

The 15th District of the Iowa Senate is located in central Iowa, and is currently composed of part of the city of Des Moines in Polk County.

== Current elected officials ==
Tony Bisignano is the senator currently representing the 15th District.

The area of the 15th District contains two Iowa House of Representatives districts:

- The 29th District (represented by Brian Meyer)
- The 30th District (represented by Megan Srinivas)

The district is also located in Iowa's 3rd congressional district, which is represented by U.S. Representative Zach Nunn.

== List of representatives ==
Representative	Party	Dates	Residence	Notes
Thomas Hart Benton	Democrat	1846–1847	Dubuque, Iowa	
Theophilus Crawford	Democrat	1846–1847	Dyersville, Iowa	
John G. Shields	Democrat	1848–1951	Dubuque County	
Warner Lewis	Democrat	1850–1851	Dubuque County	
Jefferson David Hillis	Whig	1852–1855	Marion County	
James Latimer Hogin	Republican	1856–1857	Sigourney, Iowa	
Oliver P. Sherraden	Republican	1858–1859	Richland, Iowa	
William B. Lewis	Republican	1860–1863	Washington County	
John Abbott Parvin	Republican	1864–1867	Muscatine, Iowa	
Granville G. Bennett	Republican	1868–1871	Washington, Iowa	
Joseph Decker Miles	Republican	1872–1875	Washington County	
William Wilson	Democrat	1876–1877	Washington, Iowa	
Thomas R. Gilmore	Republican	1878–1879	Mahaska County	
John Kelly Johnson	Republican	1880–1883	Oskaloosa, Iowa	
Edward R. Cassatt	Democrat	1884–1891	Marion County	
Theodore Bolivar Perry	Democrat	1892–1895	Albia, Iowa	
Samuel Druet	Republican	1896–1899	Marysville, Iowa	
Frederick Townsend	Democrat	1900–1903	Albia, Iowa	
James L. Warren	Republican	1904–1908	Marion County	
John Thomas Clarkson	Democrat	1909–1916	Albia, Iowa	
John Rees Price	Republican	1917–1924	Albia, Iowa	
William Alexander Clark	Republican	1925–1932	Marion County	
Carl Aschenbrenner	Democrat	1933–1936	Pella, Iowa	
Hugh W. Lundy	Republican	1937–1944	Albia, Iowa	
Tunis H. Klein	Democrat	1945–1948	Pella, Iowa	
Francis M. Roberts	Democrat	1949–1952	Marion County	
Leon N. Miller	Democrat	1953–1956	Knoxville, Iowa	
Carroll Price	Republican	1957–1962	Knoxville, Iowa	
Vera H. Shivvers	Republican	1963–1964	Marion County	
Gilbert E. Klefstad	Democrat	1965–1966	Pottawattamie County	
Joseph W. Cassidy	Democrat	1967–1968	Scott County	
Roger W. Jepsen	Republican	1967–1969	Davenport, Iowa	Beginning with the 62nd General Assembly, Iowa implemented a temporary measure to meet the requirements of Reynolds v. Sims. Under this plan, each senate district received one Senator except for 7 major cities in Iowa which received additional senators based on population. Senate District 15 in Davenport had two senators until 1970.
Edward E. Nicholson	Republican	1969–1970	Davenport, Iowa	
Harold A. Thordsen	Republican	1969–1970	Davenport, Iowa	
C. Joseph Coleman	Democrat	1971–1972	Clare, Iowa	
Ralph Wilson Potter	Republican	1973–1974	Marion, Iowa	
Steve Sovern	Democrat	1975–1976	Marion, Iowa	
Robert Rush	Democrat	1977–1982	Cedar Rapids, Iowa	
Arthur L. Gratias	Republican	1983–1986	Nora Springs, Iowa	
Kenneth Daniel Scott	Democrat	1987–1990	Mason City, Iowa	
Allen Borlaug	Republican	1991–1998	Chickasaw County	
Betty A. Soukup	Democrat	1999–2002	Chickasaw County	
Robert E. Dvorsky	Democrat	2003–2012	Coralville, Iowa	
Dennis H. Black	Democrat	2013–2014	Lynnville, Iowa	
Chaz Allen	Democrat	2015–2018	Newton, Iowa	
Zach Nunn	Republican	2019–2022	Bondurant, Iowa	
Tony Bisignano	Democrat	2023–present	Des Moines, Iowa	

== Historical district boundaries ==
Map	Description	Years effective	Notes
	Black Hawk County Buchanan County; Clayton County; Delaware County; Dubuque County; Fayette County	1846–1849	From 1846 to 1857, district numbering was not utilized by the Iowa State Legislature. This convention was added with the passing of the 1857 Iowa Constitution. Numbering of districts pre-1857 is done as a matter of historic convenience.
	Allamakee Black Hawk County; Buchanan County; Clayton County; Delaware County; Dubuque County; Fayette County; Winneshiek County	1850–1851	
	Madison County Marion County; Warren County	1852–1855	
	Keokuk County	1856–1859	
	Washington County	1860–1863	
	Muscatine County	1864–1867	
	Washington County	1868–1873	
	Lousia County Washington County	1874–1877	
	Louisa County	1878–1883	
	Marion County	1884–1887	
	Marion County Monroe County	1888–1962	
	Pottawattamie County	1963–1966	
	Scott County	1967–1970	Beginning with the 62nd General Assembly, Iowa implemented a temporary measure to meet the requirements of Reynolds v. Sims. Under this plan, each senate district received one senator, except for seven major cities, which received additional senators based on population. Senate District 15 in Davenport had two senators until 1970.
	Calhoun County (partial) Webster County	1971–1972	In 1970, the Iowa Legislature passed an amendment to the Iowa Constitution setting forth the rules for legislative redistricting in order to abide by the rules established by the Reynolds v. Sims Supreme Court case. The first reapportionment map created by the Republican controlled legislature was deemed unconstitutional, but was still used for the 1970 election.
	Linn County (partial)	1973–1982	
	Cerro Gordo County (partial) Chickasaw County (partial); Floyd County; Howard County; Mitchell County	1983–1992	
	Chickasaw County Floyd County; Howard County; Mitchell County (partial); Winneshiek County	1993–2002	
	Johnson County (partial): Big Grove Township; Cedar Township; Clear Creek Township; Graham Township; Hardin Township; Jefferson Township; Madison Township; Monroe Township; Newport Township; Oxford Township; Penn Township; Coralville; Iowa City (partial; Western neighborhoods around US-218; North Liberty; Oxford; Shueyville; Solon; Swisher; Tiffin; Linn County (partial): Bertram Township; Brown Township; Buffalo Township; College Township; Franklin Township; Linn Township; Marion Township (partial); Region south of Marion and west of US-151; Putnam Township; Bertram; Ely; Lisbon; Mount Vernon; Springville	2003–2012	
	Jasper County (partial): Excluding; Elk Creek Township; Fairview Township; Lynn Grove Township; Palo Alto Township; Lynnville; Monroe; Reasnor; Sully; Polk County (partial): Beaver Township; Camp Township; Clay Township; Elkhart Township; Franklin Township; Four Mile Township; Washington Township; Altoona; Bondurant; Carlisle (partial); Northern areas formerly part of Four Mile Township; Elkhart; Mitchellville; Runnells		
	Polk County (partial): Des Moines (partial)	2023–present	

== See also ==
- Iowa General Assembly
- Iowa Senate
