= Iowa City metropolitan area =

Metropolitan area in United States of America

Iowa City, IA Iowa City, IA Metropolitan Statistical Area
- Metropolitan Statistical Area
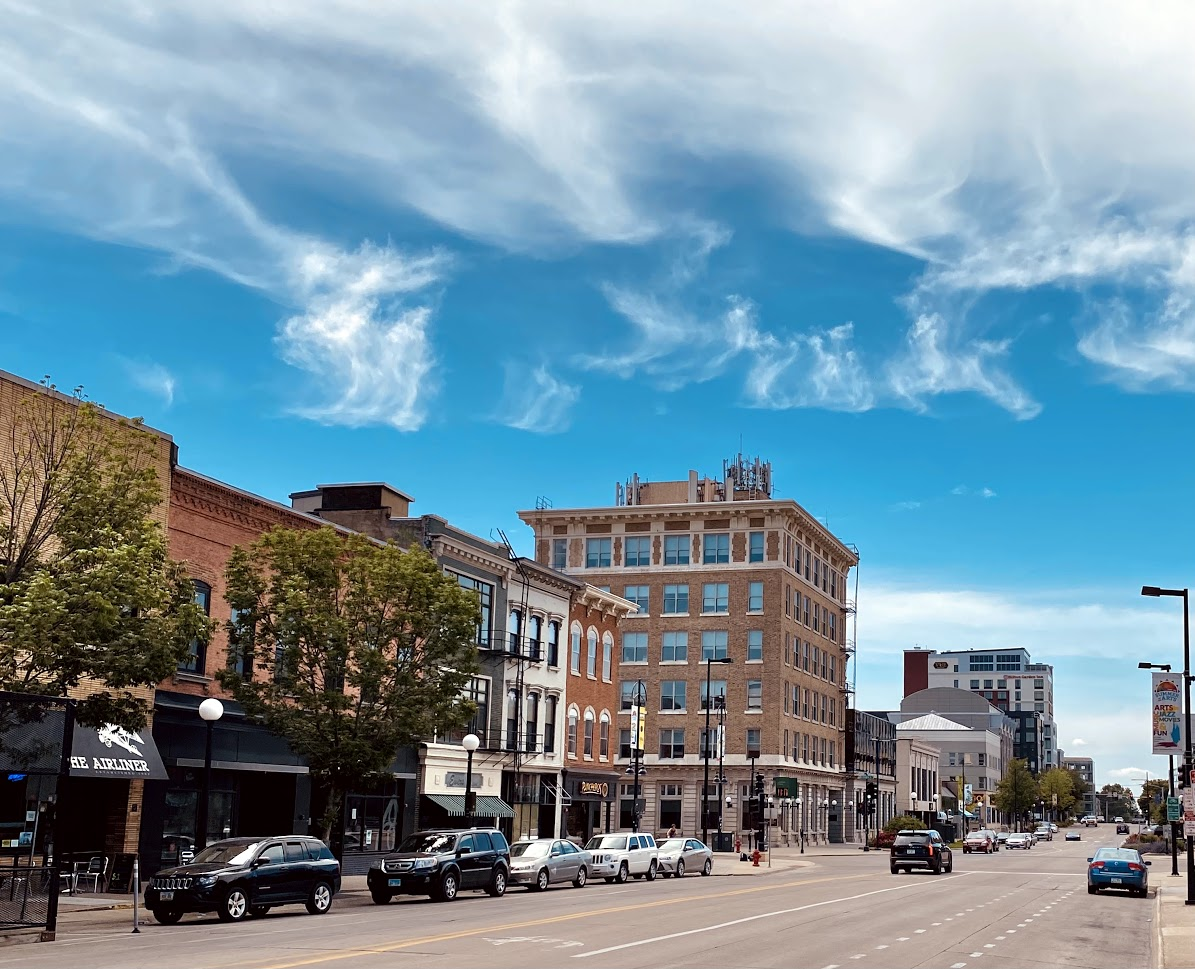
- Downtown Iowa City, June 2021
Map of Cedar Rapids–Iowa City, IA CSA
City of Cedar Rapids
Cedar Rapids, IA MSA
Iowa City
Iowa City, IA MSA
- Country: United States
- State: Iowa
- Principal city: Iowa City
- Other city: Coralville

Population
  - Metro: 182,711
- Time zone: UTC−6 (CST)
  - Summer (DST): UTC−5 (CDT)

The Iowa City Metropolitan Statistical Area, as defined by the United States Census Bureau, is an area consisting of two counties in Iowa anchored by the city of Iowa City. The Metropolitan Statistical Area (MSA) had a population of 182,711 people in the 2025 US Census Bureau population estimate. growing 4.16% compared to 2020.

The Iowa City Metropolitan Statistical Area (MSA) is also a part of a Combined Statistical Area (CSA) with the nearby Cedar Rapids Metropolitan Statistical Area (MSA). This CSA plus two additional counties are known as the Iowa City-Cedar Rapids (ICR) region and collectively have a population of nearly 500,000.

== Counties ==
Johnson and Washington make up the Iowa City metropolitan area with Johnson County being the second fastest growing county in Iowa.

== Communities ==
- Places with more than 50,000 inhabitants
  - Iowa City (Principal city)
- Places with 5,000 to 50,000 inhabitants
  - Coralville
  - North Liberty, at 20%, fastest growing city in Johnson County (2010-2017)
  - Washington
- Places with 1,000 to 5,000 inhabitants
  - Kalona
  - Lone Tree
  - Riverside
  - Solon
  - Tiffin
  - Wellman
  - West Branch (partial)
  - University Heights
- Places with 500 to 1,000 inhabitants
  - Ainsworth
  - Brighton
  - Hills
  - Oxford
  - Shueyville
  - Swisher
- Places with less than 500 inhabitants
  - Coppock (partial)
  - Crawfordsville
  - West Chester
- Unincorporated places
  - Cosgrove
  - Elmira
  - Frytown
  - Joetown
  - Morse
  - Oasis
  - River Junction
  - Sharon Center
  - Sutliff
  - Windham

== Demographics ==
As of the census of 2000, there were 131,676 people, 52,136 households, and 29,213 families residing within the MSA. The racial makeup of the MSA was 91.22% White, 2.49% African American, 0.27% Native American, 3.52% Asian, 0.04% Pacific Islander, 1.08% from other races, and 1.38% from two or more races. Hispanic or Latino of any race were 2.54% of the population.

=== 2013 demographic estimates ===
As of the 2013 US Census Bureau population estimate there were 161,170 people, an increase of 2800 people or 1.8% compared to 2012, due to 2,059 births, 651 international migrants and 889 from domestic migration. This compares favorably to nearly two thirds of Iowa counties who have lost population over 2012–2013.

== Socioeconomic data ==
The median income for a household in the MSA was $39,582, and the median income for a family was $52,874. Males had a median income of $32,936 versus $26,306 for females. The per capita income for the MSA was $20,221, as of the census of 2000.

== See also ==
- Iowa statistical areas
