= Sharon Township, Johnson County, Iowa =

Township in Johnson County, Iowa, U.S.

Coordinates: 41.57°N 91.66°W

Sharon Township is one of the twenty townships of Johnson County, Iowa, United States. It is located on the southern county line, about 6 miles (9.7 km) southwest of Iowa City (at Township 78 North, Range 7 West of the Fifth Principal Meridian). It is adjacent to Washington, Union and Liberty Townships, as well as Washington County.

== Geography ==
Sharon Township has an area of approximately 36 square miles (93 km^{2}), and contains 36 sections of 640 acres (2.6 km^{2}) each. There are several small rivers in Sharon Township, including Dirty Face Creek, Picayune Creek and Old Man's Creek. The major roads are Highway 1, Sharon Center Road (F62) and 500th St. (the "Frytown Road").

== Population ==
Sharon Township is largely rural, consisting of small farms and acreages. The current population is 1,325.

A significant part of the Sharon Township population are Amish and Mennonite, and Amish buggies are a common sight on the roads in the township.

== History ==
The first settlers arrived in the Sharon Township area around 1838, including Nathaniel McClure, William B. Ford and Asa Bailey.

Sharon Township was originally part of Liberty Township to the east, and Washington Township to the west. It became a township in its own right on February 1, 1858, likely named after the Biblical Plain of Sharon, a beautiful and fertile land. The first election was held in Bonn's school house on the first Monday in April 1858 for township officers.

There was a post office at in the former unincorporated community of Belle Aire (or Bell Aire and Bell Air), in the northwest part of section 35, from September 26, 1857 to January 22, 1877, and again from July 13, 1877 to October 29, 1877. Sharon Center also had a post office from January 28, 1878 to August 15, 1900.

Sharon Township had a prominent group of Welsh settlers, members of the Welsh Church in Union Township to the north.

== Localities ==
The unincorporated town of Sharon Center is located in Sharon Township at the intersection of Sharon Center Road and 500th St. It consists of about a dozen houses and several small businesses.

Another small unincorporated place called Bayertown existed as a small community until at least 1930, but it was not really a town, it contained a few houses and just a single building that served as a general store, dance hall and community center. It was located in section 24, in the eastern part of the township.

== Government ==
Sharon Township is governed by Johnson County, but does have two elected officials, Township Clerk and Township Trustee.
