= Old Womans Creek =

Stream in Iowa, US

Coordinates: 41°36′31″N 91°38′22″W

Old Womans Creek is a stream in Johnson County, Iowa, United States. It is a tributary to Old Mans Creek.

According to tradition, Old Womans Creek was named for its use as a remote hiding spot for Native American women during tribal conflicts.
