= Graham Township, Johnson County, Iowa =

Graham Township, Iowa
- Census-designated place
- Location within Iowa
- Coordinates: 41°43′46″N 91°24′55″W
- Country: United States
- State: Iowa
- County: Johnson

Area
  - Total: 30.3 sq mi (78.5 km^{2})
  - Land: 30.3 sq mi (78.5 km^{2})
  - Water: 0 sq mi (0.00 km^{2})

Population (2020)
  - Total: 494
  - Density: 13.9/sq mi (5.37/km^{2})
- Time zone: UTC-6 (Central (CST))
  - Summer (DST): UTC-5 (CDT)

Graham Township is a township in Johnson County, Iowa, United States.

== History ==
Graham Township was organized in 1857. It is named after John Graham, an early settler.

== Demographics ==
As of the 2020 Census, there were 494 people and 256 households in the community. The population density was 16.30 inhabitants per square mile (6.29 inhabitants/km^{2}).

The median age in the city was 53.9 years.

== Politics ==
Graham Township vote by party in presidential elections
Year	Democratic	Republican	Third Parties
2020	62.84% 208	35.65% 118	3.02% 10
2016	56.92% 185	37.54% 122	5.54% 18
2012	61.92% 187	35.43% 107	2.65% 8
2008	63.56% 143	32.89% 74	3.56% 8
2004	56.34% 120	40.38% 86	3.29% 7
2000	61.19% 123	30.85% 62	7.96% 16
1996	59.90% 124	27.05% 56	13.04% 27
1992	49.13% 113	18.70% 43	32.17% 74
1988	79.02% 177	20.98% 47	0.00% 0
1984	65.97% 157	34.03% 81	0.00% 0
1980	51.38% 112	34.40% 75	14.22% 31
1976	61.19% 123	34.83% 70	3.98% 8
1972	56.55% 95	43.45% 73	0.00% 0
1968	55.56% 115	36.71% 76	7.73% 16
1964	70.81% 148	29.19% 61	0.00% 0
1960	62.61% 144	37.39% 86	0.00% 0
1956	65.31% 160	34.69% 85	0.00% 0
1952	53.78% 135	46.22% 116	0.00% 0
1948	63.37% 154	34.98% 85	1.65% 4
1944	64.32% 137	35.68% 76	0.00% 0
