= Dirty Face =

Dirty Face or Dirtyface may refer to:

- Dirty Face Creek, a stream in Iowa
- Dirtyface Peak, a mountain in Washington
