= 1892 United States presidential election in Iowa =

- November 8, 1892
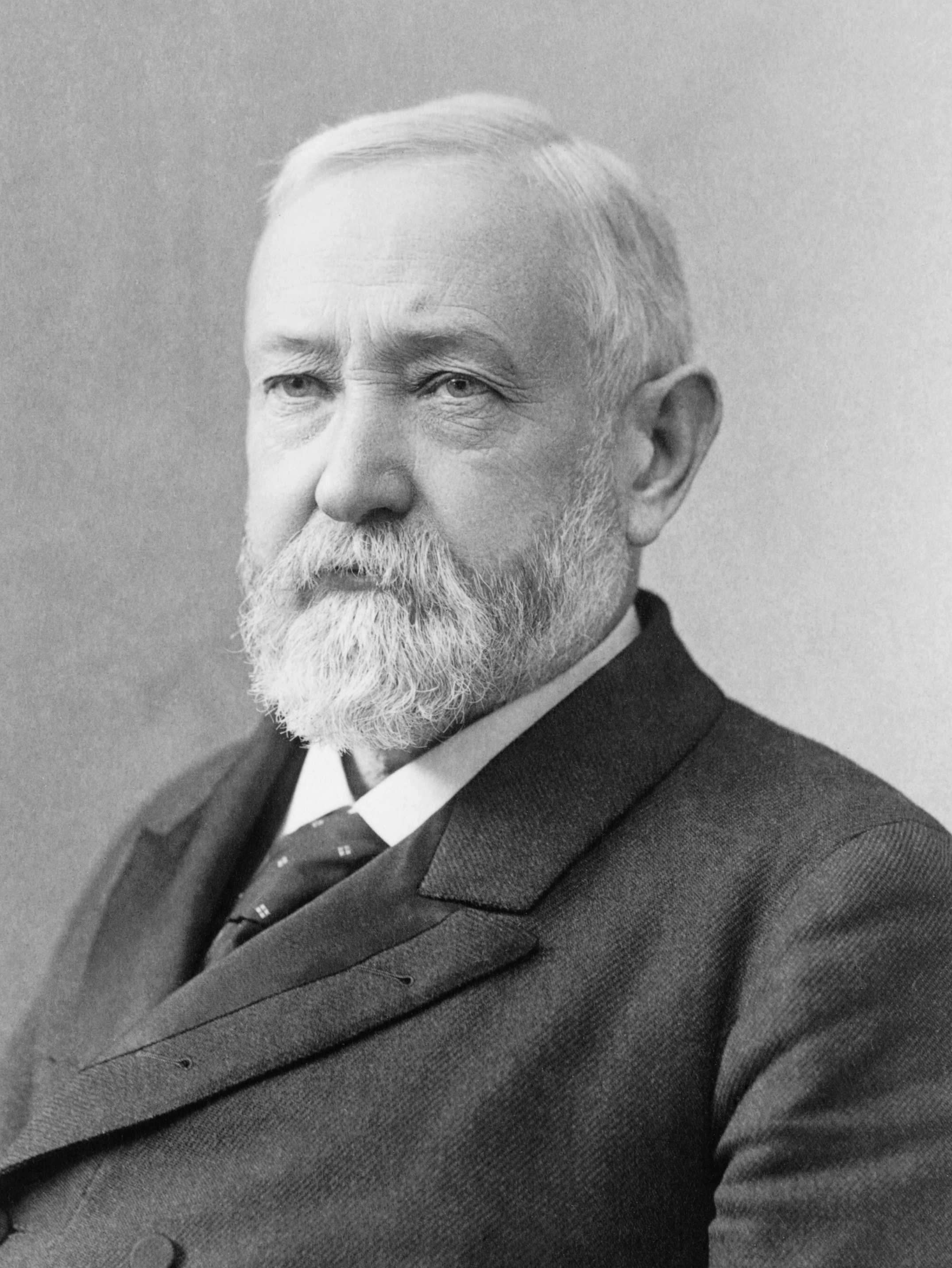

Nominee	Benjamin Harrison	Grover Cleveland
Party	Republican	Democratic
Home state	Indiana	New York
Running mate	Whitelaw Reid	Adlai Stevenson I
Electoral vote	13	0
Popular vote	219,795	196,367
Percentage	49.60%	44.31%
County results
Harrison
30–40%
40–50%
50–60%
60–70%
Cleveland
40–50%
50–60%
60–70%
President before election
Benjamin Harrison
Republican
Elected President
Grover Cleveland
Democratic

The 1892 United States presidential election in Iowa took place on November 8, 1892. All contemporary 44 states were part of the 1892 United States presidential election. Voters chose 13 electors to the Electoral College, which selected the president and vice president.

Iowa was won by the Republican nominees, incumbent President Benjamin Harrison of Indiana and his running mate Whitelaw Reid of New York by a margin of 5.29%. This was the first election in which Iowa voted for a different candidate than Wisconsin, a phenomenon that has occurred only 5 times since - 1924, 1940, 1976, 2004, and 2020.

This election resulted in Cleveland becoming the third US president of only 7 and the second of only 5 Democrats to have ever held office without winning Iowa in an election since its admission to the union in 1846.

Cleveland is the only candidate to be elected twice without ever carrying Iowa in the state's history. Franklin D. Roosevelt won two terms in 1940 and 1944 without Iowa, but because those were his third and fourth terms, he had already carried the state twice in 1932 and 1936.

== Results ==
1892 United States presidential election in Iowa
Party	Candidate	Votes	Percentage	Electoral votes
Republican	Benjamin Harrison (incumbent)	219,795	49.60%	13
Democratic	Grover Cleveland	196,367	44.31%	0
People's	James B. Weaver	20,595	4.65%	0
Prohibition	John Bidwell	6,402	1.44%	0
Totals		443,159	100.00%	13
Voter turnout				—

=== Results by county ===
County	Benjamin Harrison Republican		Stephen Grover Cleveland Democratic		James Baird Weaver People's		John Bidwell Prohibition		Margin		Total votes cast
County	#	%	#	%	#	%	#	%	#	%	Total votes cast
Adair	1,836	54.66%	1,264	37.63%	215	6.40%	44	1.31%	572	17.03%	3,359
Adams	1,533	52.83%	1,149	39.59%	179	6.17%	41	1.41%	384	13.23%	2,902
Allamakee	1,832	46.94%	1,956	50.12%	75	1.92%	40	1.02%	-124	-3.18%	3,903
Appanoose	2,534	50.81%	1,924	38.58%	479	9.60%	50	1.00%	610	12.23%	4,987
Audubon	1,288	46.53%	1,393	50.33%	66	2.38%	21	0.76%	-105	-3.79%	2,768
Benton	2,694	48.64%	2,745	49.56%	69	1.25%	31	0.56%	-51	-0.92%	5,539
Black Hawk	3,483	57.08%	2,544	41.69%	29	0.48%	46	0.75%	939	15.39%	6,102
Boone	2,959	57.31%	1,925	37.28%	179	3.47%	100	1.94%	1,034	20.03%	5,163
Bremer	1,555	43.44%	1,933	53.99%	51	1.42%	41	1.15%	-378	-10.56%	3,580
Buchanan	2,498	51.86%	2,166	44.97%	96	1.99%	57	1.18%	332	6.89%	4,817
Buena Vista	1,712	57.41%	982	32.93%	247	8.28%	41	1.37%	730	24.48%	2,982
Butler	2,129	58.76%	1,430	39.47%	28	0.77%	36	0.99%	699	19.29%	3,623
Calhoun	1,969	60.75%	1,104	34.06%	132	4.07%	36	1.11%	865	26.69%	3,241
Carroll	1,592	39.00%	2,375	58.18%	68	1.67%	47	1.15%	-783	-19.18%	4,082
Cass	2,317	49.54%	1,990	42.55%	352	7.53%	18	0.38%	327	6.99%	4,677
Cedar	2,130	45.87%	2,347	50.54%	74	1.59%	93	2.00%	-217	-4.67%	4,644
Cerro Gordo	2,133	60.51%	1,209	34.30%	55	1.56%	128	3.63%	924	26.21%	3,525
Cherokee	1,755	56.54%	1,157	37.27%	88	2.84%	104	3.35%	598	19.27%	3,104
Chickasaw	1,516	43.95%	1,878	54.45%	43	1.25%	12	0.35%	-362	-10.50%	3,449
Clarke	1,455	54.17%	961	35.78%	239	8.90%	31	1.15%	494	18.39%	2,686
Clay	1,516	64.21%	654	27.70%	149	6.31%	42	1.78%	862	36.51%	2,361
Clayton	2,443	41.63%	3,337	56.86%	57	0.97%	32	0.55%	-894	-15.23%	5,869
Clinton	3,893	40.03%	5,649	58.08%	132	1.36%	52	0.53%	-1,756	-18.05%	9,726
Crawford	1,511	38.35%	2,272	57.66%	133	3.38%	24	0.61%	-761	-19.31%	3,940
Dallas	2,679	56.02%	1,641	34.32%	358	7.49%	104	2.17%	1,038	21.71%	4,782
Davis	1,349	38.88%	1,481	42.68%	601	17.32%	39	1.12%	-132	-3.80%	3,470
Decatur	1,856	49.10%	1,486	39.31%	403	10.66%	35	0.93%	370	9.79%	3,780
Delaware	2,294	55.44%	1,810	43.74%	15	0.36%	19	0.46%	484	11.70%	4,138
Des Moines	3,361	42.03%	4,526	56.60%	55	0.69%	54	0.68%	-1,165	-14.57%	7,996
Dickinson	801	61.29%	443	33.89%	47	3.60%	16	1.22%	358	27.39%	1,307
Dubuque	3,526	33.54%	6,831	64.98%	112	1.07%	44	0.42%	-3,305	-31.44%	10,513
Emmet	831	66.00%	391	31.06%	19	1.51%	18	1.43%	440	34.95%	1,259
Fayette	2,771	49.85%	2,499	44.95%	208	3.74%	81	1.46%	272	4.89%	5,559
Floyd	2,017	56.37%	1,387	38.76%	124	3.47%	50	1.40%	630	17.61%	3,578
Franklin	1,771	61.71%	1,064	37.07%	23	0.80%	12	0.42%	707	24.63%	2,870
Fremont	1,635	41.35%	1,716	43.40%	560	14.16%	43	1.09%	-81	-2.05%	3,954
Greene	2,084	57.11%	1,333	36.53%	168	4.60%	64	1.75%	751	20.58%	3,649
Grundy	1,375	48.38%	1,355	47.68%	74	2.60%	38	1.34%	20	0.70%	2,842
Guthrie	2,295	54.86%	1,540	36.82%	240	5.74%	108	2.58%	755	18.05%	4,183
Hamilton	2,073	61.46%	1,227	36.38%	43	1.27%	30	0.89%	846	25.08%	3,373
Hancock	1,214	58.51%	789	38.02%	41	1.98%	31	1.49%	425	20.48%	2,075
Hardin	2,665	61.00%	1,549	35.45%	72	1.65%	83	1.90%	1,116	25.54%	4,369
Harrison	2,302	45.05%	2,200	43.05%	536	10.49%	72	1.41%	102	2.00%	5,110
Henry	2,390	54.54%	1,710	39.02%	210	4.79%	72	1.64%	680	15.52%	4,382
Howard	1,403	51.51%	1,239	45.48%	20	0.73%	62	2.28%	164	6.02%	2,724
Humboldt	1,382	62.39%	742	33.50%	44	1.99%	47	2.12%	640	28.89%	2,215
Ida	1,192	46.71%	1,190	46.63%	130	5.09%	40	1.57%	2	0.08%	2,552
Iowa	1,672	42.15%	2,157	54.37%	89	2.24%	49	1.24%	-485	-12.23%	3,967
Jackson	1,946	38.85%	2,966	59.21%	47	0.94%	50	1.00%	-1,020	-20.36%	5,009
Jasper	3,167	50.94%	2,556	41.11%	383	6.16%	111	1.79%	611	9.83%	6,217
Jefferson	2,140	55.03%	1,545	39.73%	127	3.27%	77	1.98%	595	15.30%	3,889
Johnson	2,179	39.35%	3,227	58.28%	101	1.82%	30	0.54%	-1,048	-18.93%	5,537
Jones	2,419	49.07%	2,439	49.47%	17	0.34%	55	1.12%	-20	-0.41%	4,930
Keokuk	2,509	46.37%	2,655	49.07%	180	3.33%	67	1.24%	-146	-2.70%	5,411
Kossuth	1,801	52.96%	1,513	44.49%	59	1.73%	28	0.82%	288	8.47%	3,401
Lee	3,971	43.46%	4,956	54.24%	145	1.59%	65	0.71%	-985	-10.78%	9,137
Linn	5,602	50.85%	5,032	45.67%	141	1.28%	242	2.20%	570	5.17%	11,017
Louisa	1,796	59.45%	1,069	35.39%	110	3.64%	46	1.52%	727	24.06%	3,021
Lucas	1,550	52.58%	1,087	36.87%	243	8.24%	68	2.31%	463	15.71%	2,948
Lyon	1,110	47.56%	1,130	48.41%	77	3.30%	17	0.73%	-20	-0.86%	2,334
Madison	1,966	50.11%	1,406	35.84%	500	12.75%	51	1.30%	560	14.27%	3,923
Mahaska	3,340	47.88%	2,428	34.81%	1,046	14.99%	162	2.32%	912	13.07%	6,976
Marion	2,319	43.70%	2,540	47.86%	372	7.01%	76	1.43%	-221	-4.16%	5,307
Marshall	3,441	56.60%	2,312	38.03%	243	4.00%	84	1.38%	1,129	18.57%	6,080
Mills	1,761	49.87%	1,480	41.91%	251	7.11%	39	1.10%	281	7.96%	3,531
Mitchell	1,797	58.92%	1,162	38.10%	46	1.51%	45	1.48%	635	20.82%	3,050
Monona	1,188	37.85%	751	23.92%	1,107	35.27%	93	2.96%	81 (Note: In this county where Cleveland ran third behind Harrison and Weaver, margin given is Harrison vote minus Weaver vote and percentage margin Harrison percentage minus Weaver percentage.)	2.58%	3,139
Monroe	1,501	45.48%	1,169	35.42%	550	16.67%	80	2.42%	332	10.06%	3,300
Montgomery	2,187	59.59%	1,174	31.99%	234	6.38%	75	2.04%	1,013	27.60%	3,670
Muscatine	2,726	46.41%	2,964	50.46%	141	2.40%	43	0.73%	-238	-4.05%	5,874
O'Brien	1,666	52.94%	1,373	43.63%	75	2.38%	33	1.05%	293	9.31%	3,147
Osceola	729	50.87%	674	47.03%	15	1.05%	15	1.05%	55	3.84%	1,433
Page	2,623	55.48%	1,503	31.79%	275	5.82%	327	6.92%	1,120	23.69%	4,728
Palo Alto	1,110	46.60%	1,101	46.22%	147	6.17%	24	1.01%	9	0.38%	2,382
Plymouth	1,672	40.11%	2,244	53.83%	178	4.27%	75	1.80%	-572	-13.72%	4,169
Pocahontas	1,304	51.89%	939	37.37%	210	8.36%	60	2.39%	365	14.52%	2,513
Polk	7,757	53.76%	5,538	38.38%	784	5.43%	349	2.42%	2,219	15.38%	14,428
Pottawattamie	4,675	46.08%	4,905	48.35%	505	4.98%	60	0.59%	-230	-2.27%	10,145
Poweshiek	2,359	53.05%	1,776	39.94%	256	5.76%	56	1.26%	583	13.11%	4,447
Ringgold	1,766	55.03%	1,111	34.62%	222	6.92%	110	3.43%	655	20.41%	3,209
Sac	1,888	56.78%	1,258	37.83%	83	2.50%	96	2.89%	630	18.95%	3,325
Scott	2,999	32.15%	6,205	66.52%	65	0.70%	59	0.63%	-3,206	-34.37%	9,328
Shelby	1,674	44.41%	1,890	50.15%	176	4.67%	29	0.77%	-216	-5.73%	3,769
Sioux	2,021	51.56%	1,792	45.71%	73	1.86%	34	0.87%	229	5.84%	3,920
Story	2,797	64.51%	1,321	30.47%	112	2.58%	106	2.44%	1,476	34.04%	4,336
Tama	2,421	47.12%	2,589	50.39%	71	1.38%	57	1.11%	-168	-3.27%	5,138
Taylor	2,088	54.29%	1,423	37.00%	265	6.89%	70	1.82%	665	17.29%	3,846
Union	1,914	46.81%	1,508	36.88%	593	14.50%	74	1.81%	406	9.93%	4,089
Van Buren	2,125	52.73%	1,789	44.39%	64	1.59%	52	1.29%	336	8.34%	4,030
Wapello	3,643	46.68%	3,380	43.31%	730	9.35%	51	0.65%	263	3.37%	7,804
Warren	2,414	55.94%	1,475	34.18%	350	8.11%	76	1.76%	939	21.76%	4,315
Washington	2,518	52.05%	2,134	44.11%	104	2.15%	82	1.69%	384	7.94%	4,838
Wayne	1,825	48.84%	1,561	41.77%	299	8.00%	52	1.39%	264	7.06%	3,737
Webster	2,551	50.14%	2,159	42.43%	298	5.86%	80	1.57%	392	7.70%	5,088
Winnebago	1,083	67.10%	342	21.19%	158	9.79%	31	1.92%	741	45.91%	1,614
Winneshiek	2,578	52.43%	2,262	46.00%	31	0.63%	46	0.94%	316	6.43%	4,917
Woodbury	4,620	47.07%	4,156	42.34%	781	7.96%	259	2.64%	464	4.73%	9,816
Worth	1,273	64.49%	614	31.10%	75	3.80%	12	0.61%	659	33.38%	1,974
Wright	2,065	63.29%	1,137	34.85%	18	0.55%	43	1.32%	928	28.44%	3,263
Totals	219,795	49.60%	196,370	44.31%	20,560	4.64%	6,400	1.44%	23,425	5.29%	443,125

== See also ==
- United States presidential elections in Iowa
