= Amish, Iowa =

- Unincorporated community
- Location within Iowa Location within the United States
- Coordinates: 41°32′09″N 91°47′12″W
- Country: United States
- State: Iowa
- County: Johnson
- Elevation: 755 ft (230 m)
- Time zone: UTC-6 (Central (CST))
  - Summer (DST): UTC-5 (CDT)
- Area code: 319
- GNIS feature ID: 454170

Amish (also known locally as Joetown) is an unincorporated community in Washington Township, Johnson County, Iowa, United States. It is part of the Iowa City Metropolitan Statistical Area.

== History ==
Amish's population was 64 in 1902, and 75 in 1925. The population was 56 in 1940.
