= Big Grove Township =

Big Grove Township may refer to the following townships in the United States:

- Big Grove Township, Kendall County, Illinois
- Big Grove Township, Benton County, Iowa
- Big Grove Township, Johnson County, Iowa
