= Carl Aschenbrenner =

American physician and politician (1865–1941)

Member of the Iowa Senate from the 15th district
- In office January 9, 1933 – January 10, 1937
- Preceded by: William Alexander Clark
- Succeeded by: Hugh W. Lundy

Personal details
- Born: Carl F. Aschenbrenner; 1865 Benton County, Iowa, U.S.
- Died: 1941 (aged 75–76) Texas, U.S.
- Party: Democratic
- Spouse: Elizabeth H. Jergens (m. 1888)
- Children: 4
- Occupation: Politician, physician

Military service
- Allegiance: United States
- Branch/service: World War I
- Rank: Captain

Carl F. Aschenbrenner (1865–1941) was an American physician and politician.

Aschenbrenner was born in Benton County, Iowa, in 1865 and raised on the family farm in Tama County, near Dysart, where he attended public school. He married Elizabeth H. Jergens, a native of Will County, Illinois, in 1888. Aschenbrenner graduated from the Iowa State College of Medicine in 1894, and based his medical practice in Dysart for twelve years, until he moved his residence and practice to Pella in 1908. He served in World War I with the rank of captain. In 1932, Aschenbrenner was elected to a single four-year term on the Iowa Senate as a Democrat from District 15, which included his Marion County home as well as Monroe County. He died on 26 February 1941 in Texas, while traveling by train from Farmington, Michigan, to his alternate residence in Covina, California.
