= Dirty Face Creek =

Stream in Johnson County, Iowa, U.S.

Coordinates: 41.556963°N 91.552666°W

Dirty Face Creek is a stream in Johnson County, Iowa, in the United States. It is a tributary to Old Mans Creek.

Dirty Face Creek was so named because the children of an early settler there often had dirty faces.

== See also ==
- List of rivers of Iowa
