= Morse, Iowa =

- Unincorporated community
- Location within Iowa Location within the United States
- Country: United States
- State: Iowa
- County: Johnson
- Elevation: 768 ft (234 m)
- Time zone: UTC-6 (Central (CST))
  - Summer (DST): UTC-5 (CDT)
- Area code: 319
- GNIS feature ID: 459249

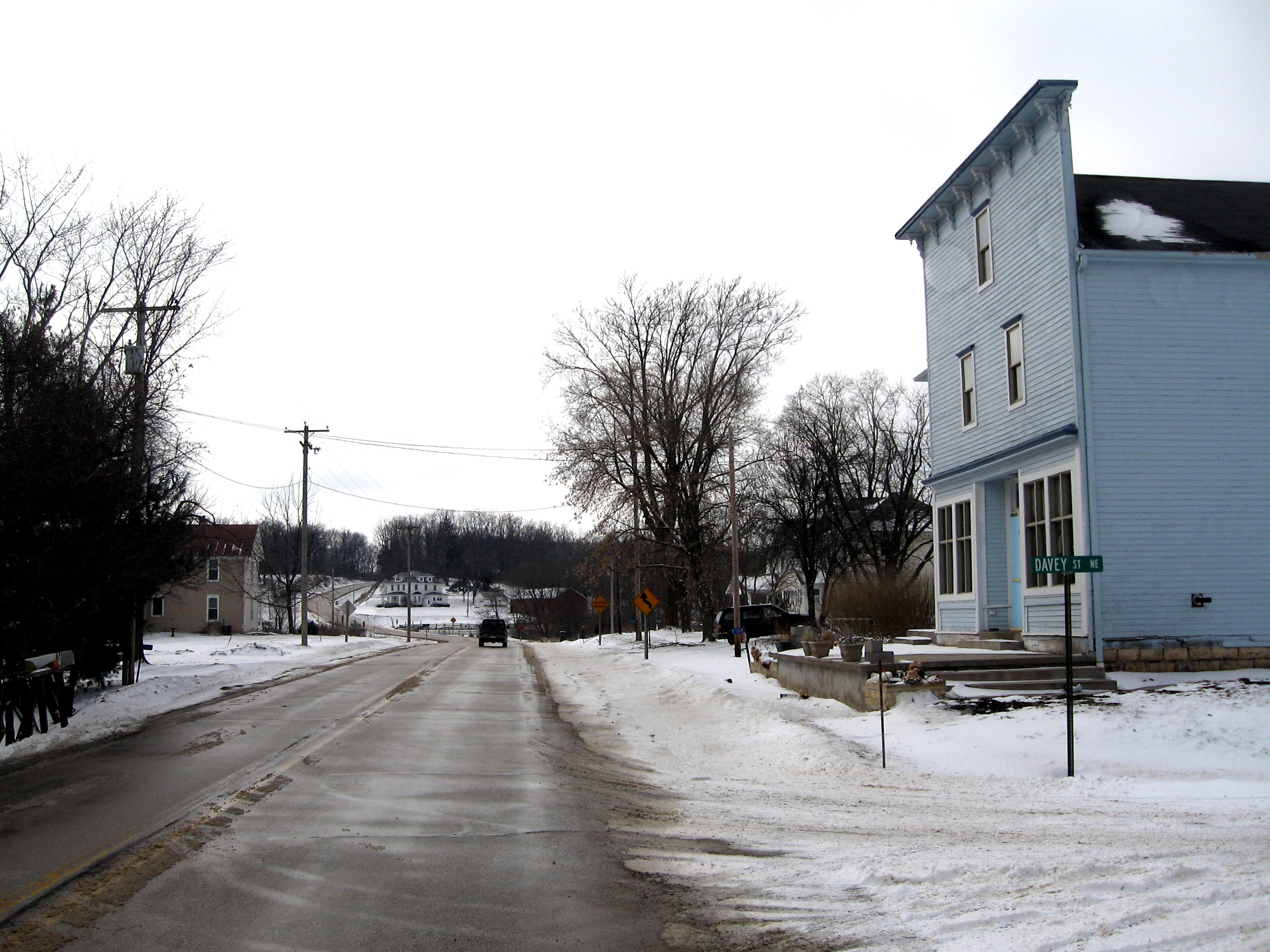
The former post office in Morse just off of Morse Road Northeast in February 2008

Morse is an unincorporated community in Section 9, Graham Township, Johnson County, Iowa, United States. It is a part of the Iowa City Metropolitan Statistical Area.

== History ==
Morse was founded in 1871. The first settler was William Jayne. One of the founders was A.W.G. Morse, an early settler in Iowa, who kept journals which have been recently published by Cedar Creek Press. It was once a stop on the Burlington, Cedar Rapids and Northern Railway, later part of the CRI&P.

Morse's population was 91 in 1925. The population was 70 in 1940.
