= Midway, Johnson County, Iowa =

- Ghost town
- Location within Iowa Location within the United States
- Coordinates: 41°37′08″N 91°26′21″W
- Country: United States
- State: Iowa
- County: Johnson
- Elevation: 686 ft (209 m)
- GNIS feature ID: 464231

Midway is a ghost town in Johnson County, Iowa, United States. It does not currently have any standing structures and is private property. Midway was 5.5 miles (8.9 km) southeast of Iowa City.

== History ==
Midway's population was 597 in 1902.
