= Union Township, Johnson County, Iowa =

Township in Johnson County, Iowa, U.S.

Coordinates: 41.6411°N 91.6636°W

Union Township is a township in Johnson County, Iowa, United States.

== History ==
Union Township was organized in 1854.
