= East Lucas Township, Johnson County, Iowa =

Township in Johnson County, Iowa, U.S.

Coordinates: 41.6106°N 91.4906°W

East Lucas Township is a township in Johnson County, Iowa, United States.

== Demographics ==
Historical populations
| Year | Pop. | ±% |
|---|---|---|
| 1980 | 459 | — |
| 1990 | 610 | +32.9% |
| 2000 | 565 | −7.4% |
Source: U.S. Census Bureau

The median household income in the township is $79,500.
