= Jefferson David Hillis =

American politician (1810–1878)

Jefferson David Hillis (January 28, 1810 – January 10, 1878) was an American politician and physician.

Hillis was born on January 28, 1810, in Lexington, Kentucky. He married Lucinda Maria Starrett in Lafayette, Indiana, on September 30, 1830. The couple had four children before she died in 1843. Later that year, Hillis remarried to Esther Ann Auten in Monticello, Illinois, and with her raised seven children. The Hillis family subsequently moved to Marion County, Iowa, where Jefferson David Hillis was elected to a single term on the Iowa Senate for District 15 between 1852 and 1856 as a Whig. By the time the American Civil War began, Hillis had moved to Wisconsin and joined a regiment as a military physician. He died on January 10, 1878.
