= Pleasant Valley Township, Johnson County, Iowa =

Township in Johnson County, Iowa, U.S.

Coordinates: 41.5606°N 91.4889°W

Pleasant Valley Township is a township in Johnson County, Iowa, United States.

== History ==
Pleasant Valley Township was organized in 1846. It is named from a scenic valley upon the Iowa River that early settlers found to contain an abundance of valuable timber.
