= Hardin Township, Johnson County, Iowa =

Township in Johnson County, Iowa, U.S.

Coordinates: 41.6481°N 91.7869°W

Hardin Township is a township in Johnson County, Iowa, United States.

== History ==
Hardin Township was organized in 1858. It is named after William Hardin, an early settler.
