= Penn Township, Johnson County, Iowa =

Township in Johnson County, Iowa, U.S.

Coordinates: 41.7431°N 91.5794°W

Penn Township is a township in Johnson County, Iowa, United States.

== History ==
Penn Township was organized in 1846. It is named for William Penn.
