= Newport Township, Johnson County, Iowa =

Township in Johnson County, Iowa, U.S.

Coordinates: 41.7289°N 91.5094°W

Newport Township is a township in Johnson County, Iowa, United States.

== History ==
Newport Township was organized in 1846.
