= Cosgrove, Iowa =

- Unincorporated community
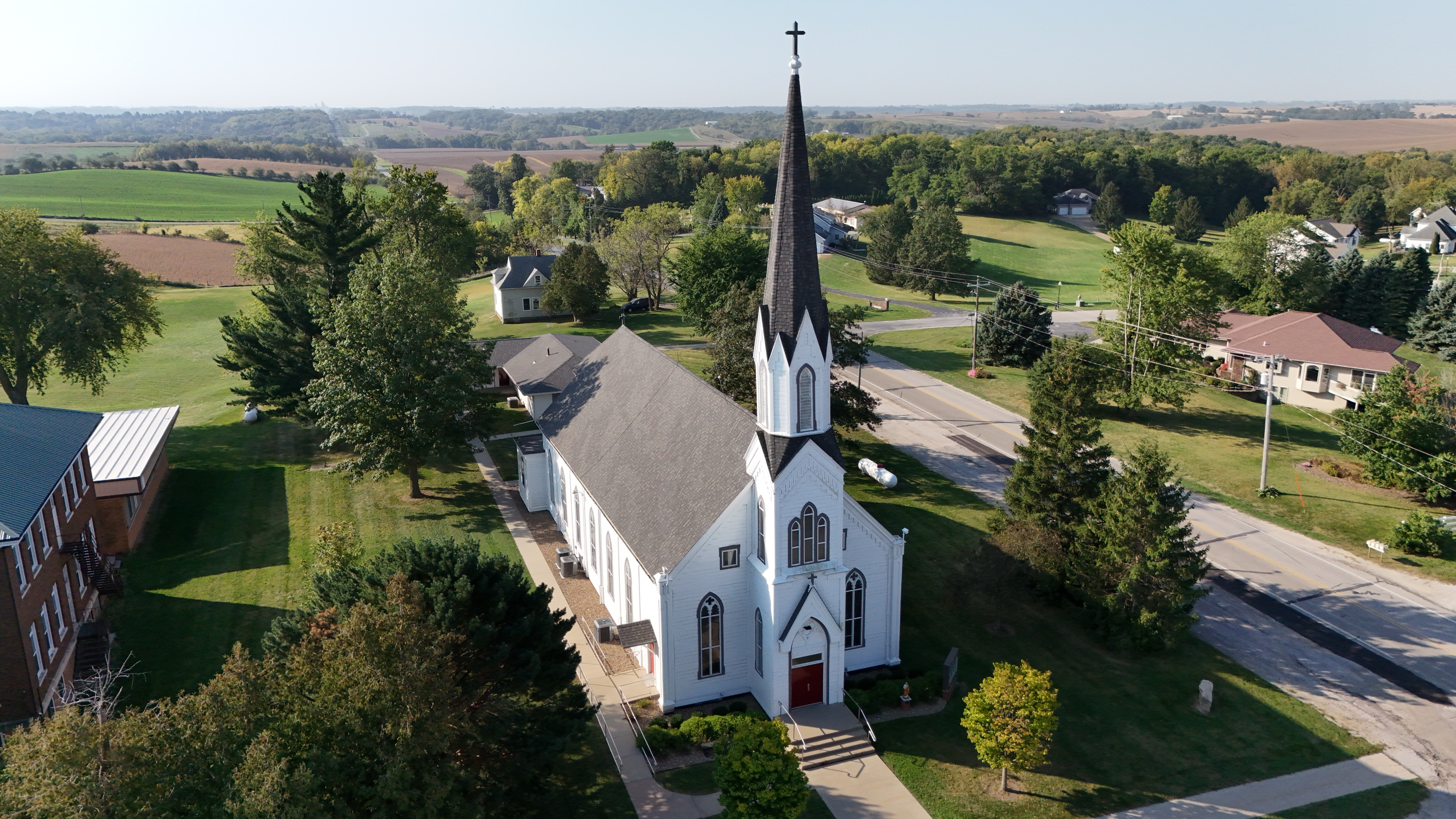
- St. Peter's Catholic Church in Cosgrove

- Location within Iowa Location within the United States
- Coordinates: 41°38′34″N 91°44′09″W
- Country: United States
- State: Iowa
- County: Johnson
- Elevation: 804 ft (245 m)
- Time zone: UTC-6 (Central (CST))
  - Summer (DST): UTC-5 (CDT)
- Area code: 319
- GNIS feature ID: 455649

Cosgrove is an unincorporated community in Johnson County, Iowa, United States.

== History ==
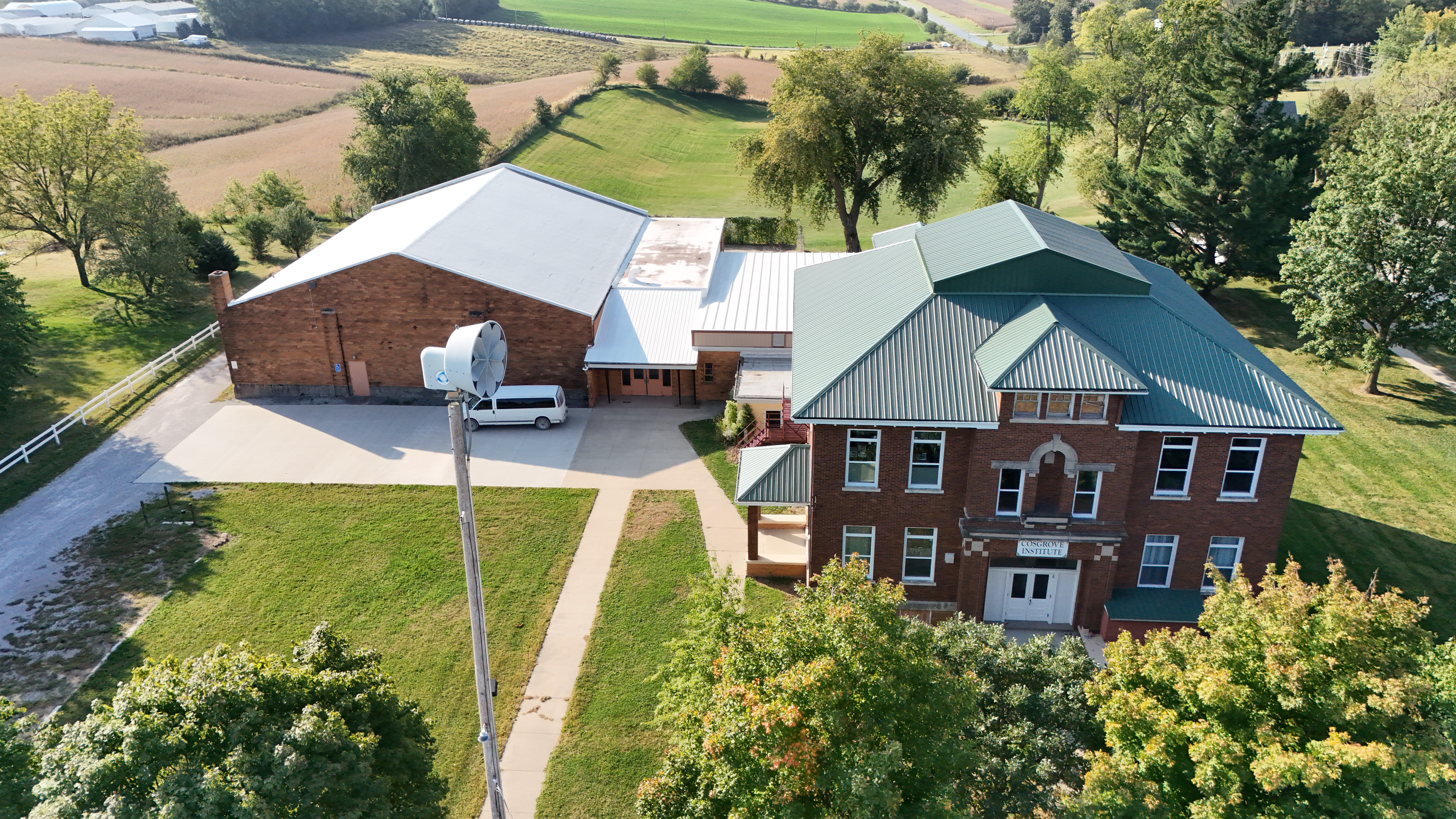
The Cosgrove Institute

Cosgrove's population was 26 in 1925. The population was 50 in 1940.
