= River Junction, Iowa =

- Unincorporated community
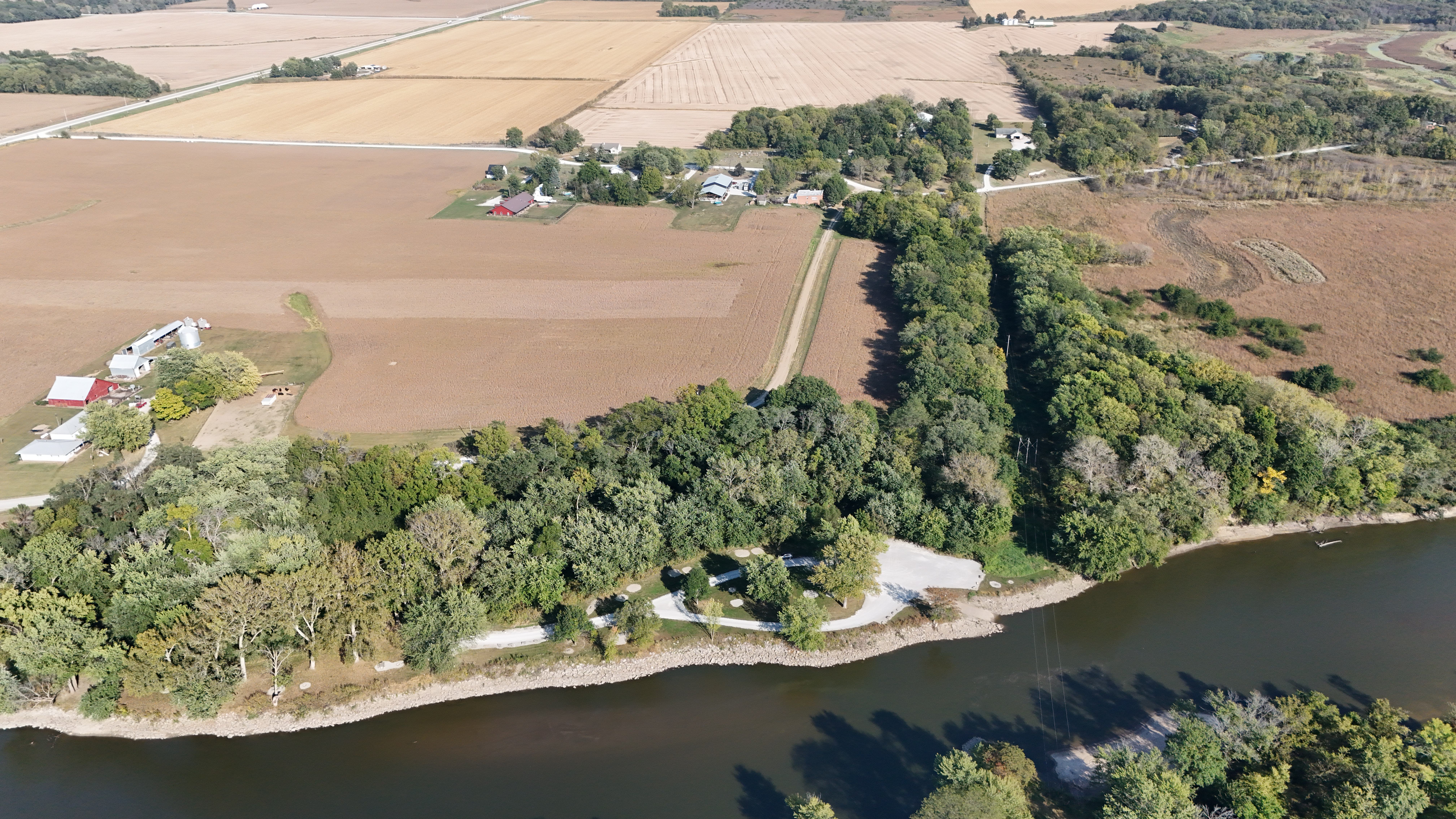
- Looking east over the Iowa River, at River Junction

- Location within Iowa Location within the United States
- Coordinates: 41°29′26″N 91°29′49″W
- Country: United States
- State: Iowa
- County: Johnson
- Elevation: 650 ft (200 m)
- Time zone: UTC-6 (Central (CST))
  - Summer (DST): UTC-5 (CDT)
- Area code: 319
- GNIS feature ID: 460649

River Junction is an unincorporated community in Johnson County, Iowa, United States.

== History ==
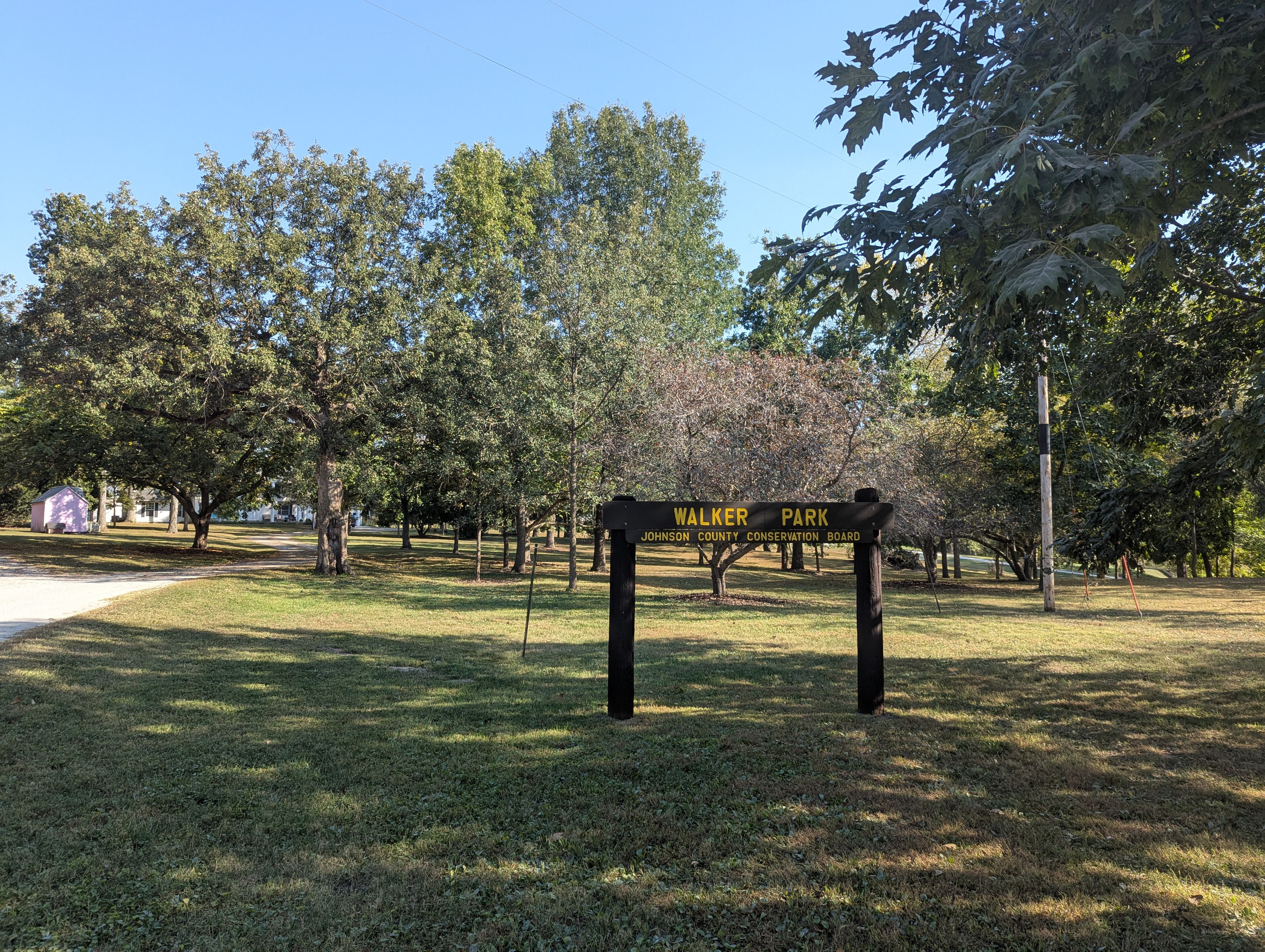
Walker Park in River Junction

The community was named after its location at the confluence of the English and Iowa Rivers. River Junction was founded in 1873. Its population was 42 in 1902. The population was 42 in 1940.
