= Swisher, Iowa =

- City
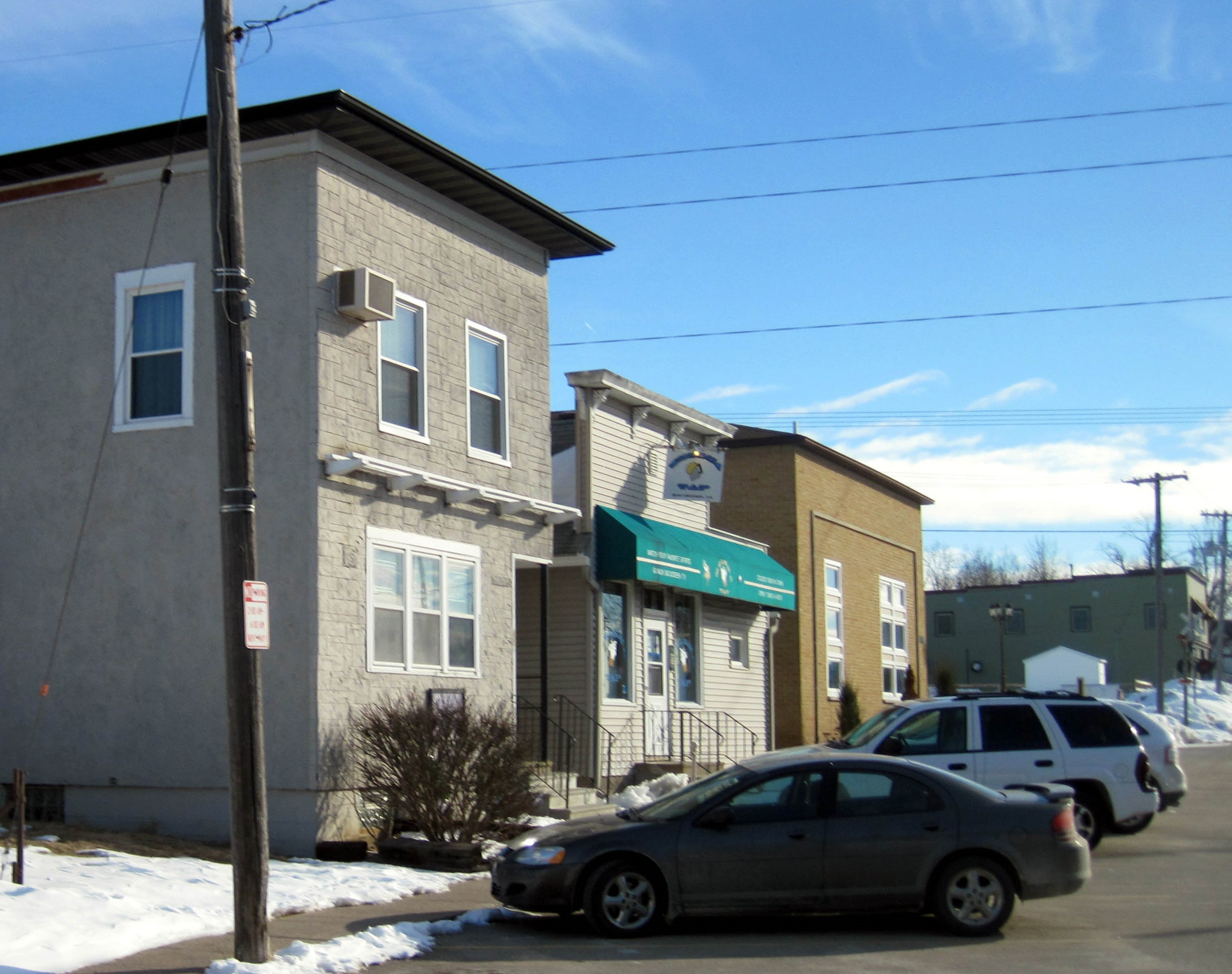
- Buildings in downtown Swisher on 2nd Street Southeast in February 2010

- Location of Swisher, Iowa
- Coordinates: 41°50′42″N 91°41′42″W
- Country: United States
- State: Iowa
- County: Johnson
- Incorporated: July 25, 1933

Government
  - Type: Mayor-Council

Area
  - Total: 0.81 sq mi (2.10 km^{2})
  - Land: 0.81 sq mi (2.10 km^{2})
  - Water: 0 sq mi (0.00 km^{2})
- Elevation: 778 ft (237 m)

Population (2020)
  - Total: 914
  - Density: 1,127.3/sq mi (435.24/km^{2})
- Time zone: UTC-6 (Central (CST))
  - Summer (DST): UTC-5 (CDT)
- ZIP code: 52338
- Area code: 319
- FIPS code: 19-76890
- GNIS feature ID: 2396017
- Website: City of Swisher, Iowa

Swisher is a city in Johnson County, Iowa, United States. It is part of the Iowa City, Iowa Metropolitan Statistical Area. The population was 914 at the time of the 2020 census.

== Geography ==
According to the United States Census Bureau, the city has a total area of 0.82 square miles (2.12 km^{2}), all land.

== Demographics ==
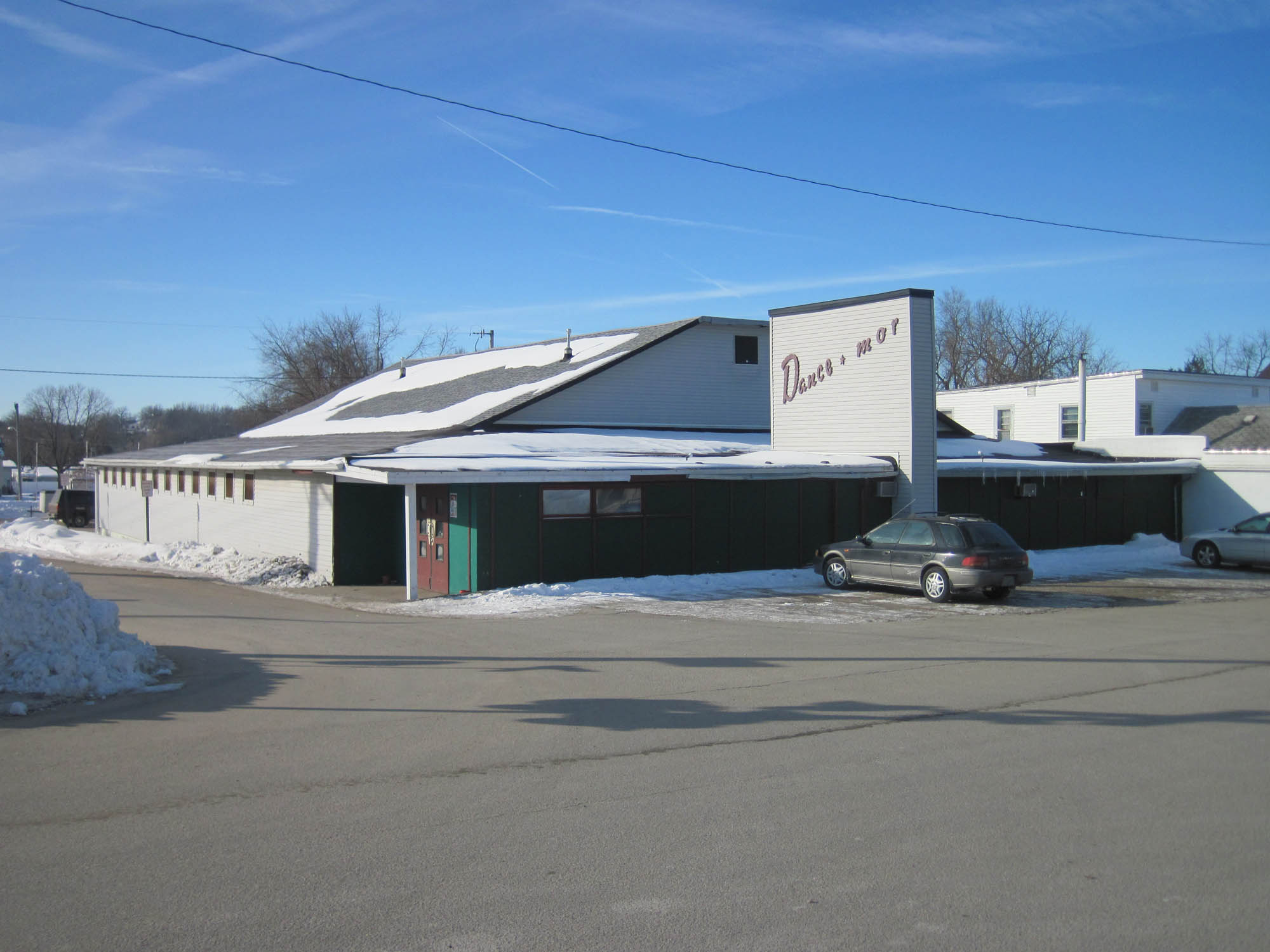
The historic Dance-Mor Ballroom dance hall located in Swisher that was built in 1929

Historical populations
Year	Pop.	±%
1940	93	—
1950	205	+120.4%
1960	271	+32.2%
1970	417	+53.9%
1980	654	+56.8%
1990	645	−1.4%
2000	813	+26.0%
2010	879	+8.1%
2020	914	+4.0%
Source:"U.S. Census website". United States Census Bureau. and Iowa Data Center; Source: U.S. Decennial Census

=== 2020 census ===
As of the census of 2020, there were 914 people, 377 households, and 280 families residing in the city. The population density was 1,127.5 inhabitants per square mile (435.3/km^{2}). There were 388 housing units at an average density of 478.6 per square mile (184.8/km^{2}). The racial makeup of the city was 94.3% White, 1.0% Black or African American, 0.0% Native American, 0.1% Asian, 0.0% Pacific Islander, 0.2% from other races and 4.4% from two or more races. Hispanic or Latino persons of any race comprised 1.5% of the population.

Of the 377 households, 34.5% of which had children under the age of 18 living with them, 59.4% were married couples living together, 8.0% were cohabitating couples, 18.0% had a female householder with no spouse or partner present and 14.6% had a male householder with no spouse or partner present. 25.7% of all households were non-families. 19.1% of all households were made up of individuals, 6.9% had someone living alone who was 65 years old or older.

The median age in the city was 40.3 years. 25.4% of the residents were under the age of 20; 4.8% were between the ages of 20 and 24; 24.7% were from 25 and 44; 29.1% were from 45 and 64; and 16.0% were 65 years of age or older. The gender makeup of the city was 49.6% male and 50.4% female.

=== 2010 census ===
As of the census of 2010, there were 879 people, 344 households, and 260 families residing in the city. The population density was 1,072.0 inhabitants per square mile (413.9/km^{2}). There were 350 housing units at an average density of 426.8 per square mile (164.8/km^{2}). The racial makeup of the city was 97.8% White, 0.8% African American, 0.1% Native American, 0.6% Asian, 0.6% from other races, and 0.1% from two or more races. Hispanic or Latino of any race were 1.0% of the population.

There were 344 households, of which 35.5% had children under the age of 18 living with them, 65.7% were married couples living together, 7.3% had a female householder with no husband present, 2.6% had a male householder with no wife present, and 24.4% were non-families. 19.8% of all households were made up of individuals, and 7.5% had someone living alone who was 65 years of age or older. The average household size was 2.56 and the average family size was 2.95.

The median age in the city was 39.5 years. 25.3% of residents were under the age of 18; 5.7% were between the ages of 18 and 24; 30.9% were from 25 to 44; 26.9% were from 45 to 64; and 11.1% were 65 years of age or older. The gender makeup of the city was 49.6% male and 50.4% female.

=== 2000 census ===
As of the census of 2000, there were 813 people, 306 households, and 231 families residing in the city. The population density was 1,769.6 inhabitants per square mile (683.2/km^{2}). There were 317 housing units at an average density of 690.0 per square mile (266.4/km^{2}). The racial makeup of the city was 99.14% White, 0.12% African American, 0.12% Native American, 0.25% Asian, 0.12% from other races, and 0.25% from two or more races. Hispanic or Latino of any race were 0.25% of the population.

There were 306 households, out of which 35.9% had children under the age of 18 living with them, 69.3% were married couples living together, 3.9% had a female householder with no husband present, and 24.2% were non-families. 19.0% of all households were made up of individuals, and 7.8% had someone living alone who was 65 years of age or older. The average household size was 2.66 and the average family size was 3.05.

26.8% are under the age of 18, 6.6% from 18 to 24, 34.9% from 25 to 44, 23.5% from 45 to 64, and 8.1% who were 65 years of age or older. The median age was 36 years. For every 100 females, there were 102.2 males. For every 100 females age 18 and over, there were 100.3 males.

The median income for a household in the city was $63,667, and the median income for a family was $67,368. Males had a median income of $40,776 versus $30,673 for females. The per capita income for the city was $24,596. About 0.9% of families and 2.4% of the population were below the poverty line, including 1.8% of those under age 18 and 3.3% of those age 65 or over.

== Government ==
Swisher operates under the mayor-council form of government. The city council consists of five members, elected at large for overlapping four-year terms, and is presided over by a popularly elected mayor, who also serves a four-year term.

=== Resignation of mayor and city clerk ===
At a regularly scheduled city council meeting on November 11, 2013, City Clerk Connie Meier and Mayor Tim Mason resigned suddenly, effectively leaving Swisher without any administrative staff.

A video of the meeting released to news outlets showed Mason and Meier engaged in an argument with council member Angie Hinrichs over a letter sent to the council from an appointed city official. In the video, Hinrichs repeatedly accused Meier of improperly sharing the letter with a local developer. In response, Meier explained that except for personnel records, all documents in the city's custody are a matter of public record and copies must be given to anyone who asks for them. When Mason tried to come to Meier's defense, Hinrichs threatened to contact the city attorney independently, stating "I just want it on the record that I did not give this because if there's any consequences that come back to the city council, I did not give this to them." It was at this point that Meier left the room. Mason called for a recess and went to speak with Meier. When he returned, he told the council that she had quit and that he too was resigning.

The resignations occurred six days after Hinrichs and another council member, Larry Svec, were re-elected to additional four-year terms.

With the mayor's seat open, Mayor Pro-Tem Mary Gudenkauf assumed the mayoral duties of the city, as well as those of the city clerk. Gudenkauf would continue to serve as acting mayor until a special election was held in February 2014.

Meier would later release a statement which read, in part, "Unfortunately, a couple of council members had made working conditions detrimental to me, making me feel uncomfortable and unsafe. Staying in my position would have enabled these two individuals to continue to treat me in an unacceptable manner."

=== 2014 special election ===
A special election was held on February 4, 2014, to fill the mayor's seat for the remainder of Tim Mason's term. Christopher J. Taylor, who had run for city council against Angie Hinrichs and Larry Svec in the fall, won the election against long-time Planning and Zoning Commission chairman Randy Hurlbert by a vote of 151 to 136.

Voter turnout was the highest ever recorded for an election in Swisher, with 48.2% of registered voters casting ballots. Taylor received the second highest number of votes ever cast for a Swisher mayor, after Scott Grabe received 158 in 2007. Grabe ran unopposed in that election.

Taylor took office nine days after the election, on February 13, to serve out the term expiring December 31, 2015. Taylor ran for and won re-election to a full, 4-year term in November 2015. He was unopposed in that election.
