= Frytown, Iowa =

- Census-designated place
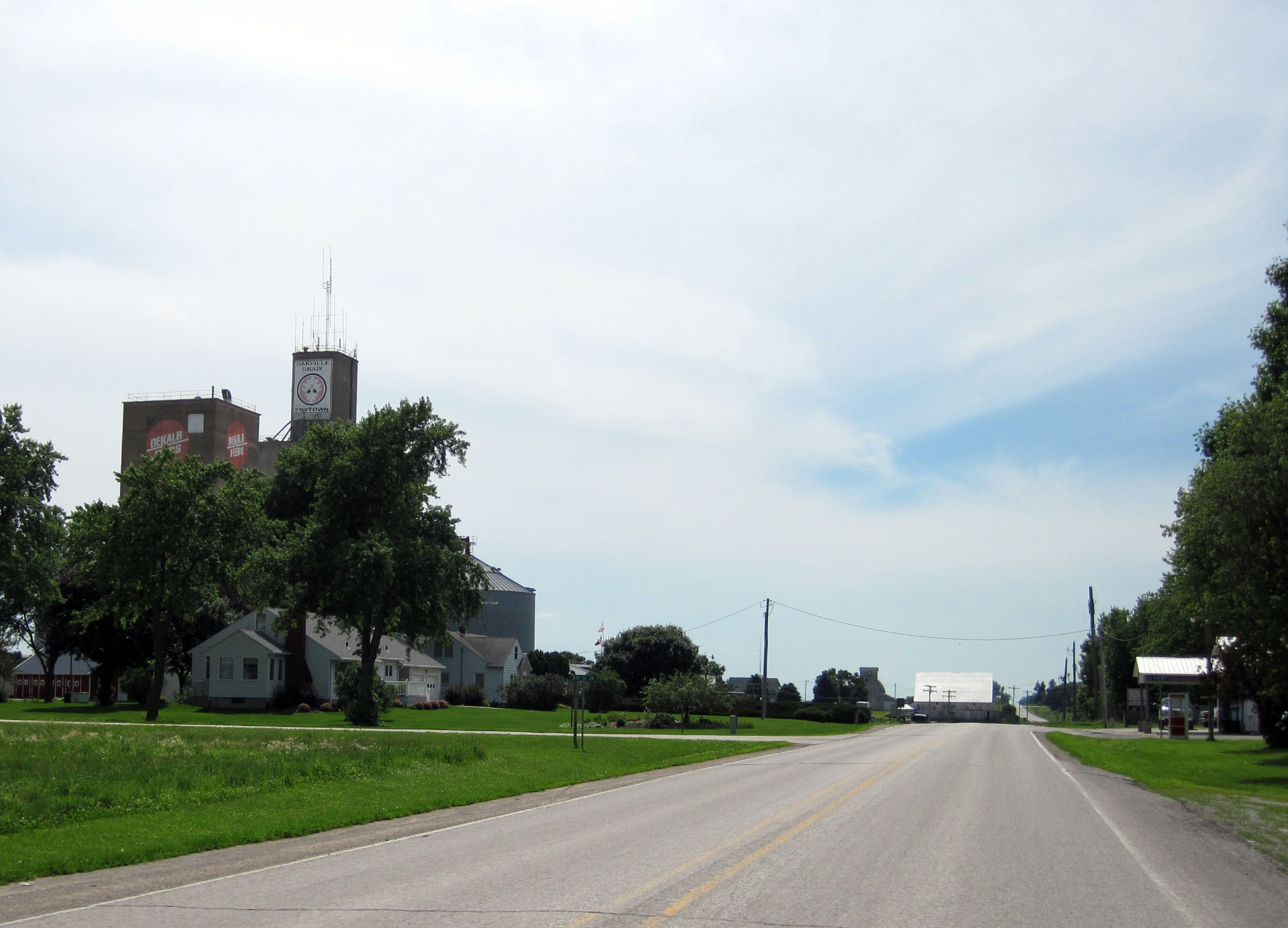
- 500th Street Southwest in Frytown in June 2009

- Location within Iowa
- Coordinates: 41°34′12″N 91°43′57″W
- Country: United States
- State: Iowa
- County: Johnson

Area
  - Total: 0.81 sq mi (2.10 km^{2})
  - Land: 0.81 sq mi (2.10 km^{2})
  - Water: 0 sq mi (0.00 km^{2})
- Elevation: 801 ft (244 m)

Population (2020)
  - Total: 193
  - Density: 238.2/sq mi (91.98/km^{2})
- Time zone: UTC-6 (Central (CST))
  - Summer (DST): UTC-5 (CDT)
- ZIP code: 52247
- Area code: 319
- GNIS feature ID: 2629964

Frytown is an unincorporated community and census-designated place (CDP) in Johnson County, Iowa, United States, approximately 10 miles southwest of Iowa City. As of the 2020 census, Frytown had a population of 193. The town has been known as Frytown since the 19th century, and is listed as such on state maps; the USGS once called it Williamstown, though it has since changed the name.

Frytown Conservation Area, a woodlands park belonging to Johnson County, is located about one mile northeast of Frytown.

== History ==
The cemetery on the east end of town has markers for the original Fry family, who were immigrants to the area, including Samuel Preston Fry (and wife Fionna Melinda Grosscup) and his father, Titus R Fry (wife, Jane Preston) and Jacob Fry (1785–1842). Yoder is the other prominent name in the Church of Christ graveyard.

The population of Frytown/Williamstown was 35 in 1925.

As of the 2010 Census, the population of Frytown was 165.

== Demographics ==
As of the 2020 Census, there were 193 people and 74 total housing units in the community. The population density was 238.27 inhabitants per square mile (92.00 inhabitants/km^{2}). The racial makeup of the city was 93.3% White, 0.5% African American, 1.0% Native American, 1.0% Asian, 0.5% from other races, and 3.6% from two or more races. Hispanic or Latino of any race were 3.6% of the population.

The median age in the city was 38.5 years.

Historical population
Census	Pop.	Note	%±
2010	165		—
2020	193		17.0%
U.S. Decennial Census
