= Jefferson Township, Johnson County, Iowa =

Township in Johnson County, Iowa, U.S.

Coordinates: 41.8225°N 91.6544°W

Jefferson Township is a township in Johnson County, Iowa, United States.

== History ==
Jefferson Township was organized in 1854. In the latter half of the 19th century, many Czech immigrants settled in the township.
