= Monroe Township, Johnson County, Iowa =

Township in Johnson County, Iowa, U.S.

Coordinates: 41.8203°N 91.7719°W

Monroe Township is a township in Johnson County, Iowa, United States. It is one of the townships on the northern edge of Johnson County, bordering Linn County.

== History ==
Prior to the 1840s, the area was known as "Dupont's Precinct" because William Dupont kept a whisky cabin there, which became a way-mark for which the settlement became known. Monroe Township was organized in 1846. In the following decades two post offices, Danforth and Gregg, were established.

During the latter half of the 19th century, the township was heavily settled by Czech immigrants. The Czech population included a number of Czech protestant families who in 1893 built a chapel on property donated by George Chadima. The chapel was called "The Evangelical Bohemian Moravian Brothers" and was a satellite of the mother church, which was near Ely in Linn County. The church functioned until 1936 when it burnded down after being struck by lightning.
