= 1960 United States presidential election in Iowa =

- November 8, 1960

Nominee	Richard Nixon	John F. Kennedy
Party	Republican	Democratic
Home state	California	Massachusetts
Running mate	Henry Cabot Lodge Jr.	Lyndon B. Johnson
Electoral vote	10	0
Popular vote	722,381	550,565
Percentage	56.71%	43.22%
County results
Nixon
50–60%
60–70%
70–80%
Kennedy
50–60%
60–70%
President before election
Dwight D. Eisenhower
Republican
Elected President
John F. Kennedy
Democratic

The 1960 United States presidential election in Iowa took place on November 8, 1960, as part of the 1960 United States presidential election. Voters chose ten representatives, or electors, to the Electoral College, who voted for president and vice president.

Iowa was won by incumbent Vice President Richard Nixon (R–California), running with United States Ambassador to the United Nations Henry Cabot Lodge Jr., with 56.71% of the popular vote, against Senator John F. Kennedy (D–Massachusetts), running with Senator Lyndon B. Johnson, with 43.22% of the popular vote. As of the 2024 presidential election, this is the last election in which Johnson County, home to Iowa City and the University of Iowa, voted for a Republican presidential candidate.

Kennedy became the fourth American president to have ever held office without carrying Iowa in an election.

== Primaries ==
=== Democratic precinct caucuses ===
While no statewide vote was held, a system of precinct caucuses were used to select delegates. Edward A. McDermott led a, first-of-its-kind- coordinated effort for the Kennedy campaign which sought to shape the results of Iowa's precinct caucuses in order to secure an Iowa delegation which favored Kennedy's candidacy. These precinct caucuses had been largely ignored by most political circles, providing an opportunity for Kennedy. His campaign had been targeting Iowa as a top priority state in its delegate strategy since, at latest, 1959, setting a goal to secure the support of 18 of the state's 26 delegates.

For years, Kennedy had been seeking to curry favor with Iowa's Democratic governor, Herschel Loveless, who had fiercely opposed Kennedy's effort to secure the vice-presidential nomination at the 1956 Democratic National Convention. Kennedy hoped to persuade Loveless against putting himself forward in 1960 as a favorite son (carrying the support of his state's delegation for himself in order to leave it united and unbound to any top contender). Loveless had been neutral for a long time, and continued to remain open to a multitude of candidates as well as a prospect of running as a favorite son (perhaps leveraging that as a means of securing the vice-presidential nomination). However, Kennedy began to secure more and more grassroots support in Iowa.

McDermott heavily organized in Iowa, more than compensating for the potential disadvantage Kennedy held due to the fact that a number of possible opponents (such as Hubert Humphrey, Stuart Symington, and Adlai Stevenson II) came from states which directly neighbored Iowa. In the Spring of 1959, McDermott founded the "Iowans for Kennedy" political club and appointed Lumond F. Wilcox, a leading Methodist figure in the state, as its co-chairman in an effort to alleviate the concerns many Iowans still held about Kennedy's Catholic faith.

McDermott also recruited Iowan Democrats to run at local precinct caucuses.

By late autumn, a Des Moines Register poll of the Iowa Democratic Party's 99 county party chairmen showed that the county leaders had come to favor Kennedy 3 to 2 over Symington and 3 to 1 over either Stevenson or Humphrey.

== Results ==
1960 United States presidential election in Iowa
Party	Candidate	Votes	%
Republican	Richard Nixon	722,381	56.71%
Democratic	John F. Kennedy	550,565	43.22%
No Party Listed	Farrell Dobbs	634	0.05%
Socialist Labor	Eric Hass	230	0.02%
Total votes		1,273,810	100.00%

=== Results by county ===
County	Richard Nixon Republican		John F. Kennedy Democratic		Farrell Dobbs No Party Listed		Eric Hass Socialist Labor		Margin		Total votes cast
County	#	%	#	%	#	%	#	%	#	%	Total votes cast
Adair	3,383	60.09%	2,245	39.88%	1	0.02%	1	0.02%	1,138	20.21%	5,630
Adams	2,185	57.08%	1,643	42.92%	0	0.00%	0	0.00%	542	14.16%	3,828
Allamakee	4,970	62.78%	2,933	37.05%	7	0.09%	6	0.08%	2,037	25.73%	7,916
Appanoose	5,040	59.43%	3,422	40.35%	15	0.18%	3	0.04%	1,618	19.08%	8,480
Audubon	2,935	53.05%	2,595	46.91%	2	0.04%	0	0.00%	340	6.14%	5,532
Benton	5,972	56.33%	4,620	43.58%	6	0.06%	3	0.03%	1,352	12.75%	10,601
Black Hawk	28,435	54.11%	24,078	45.82%	26	0.05%	12	0.02%	4,357	8.29%	52,551
Boone	6,761	53.97%	5,759	45.97%	6	0.05%	1	0.01%	1,002	8.00%	12,527
Bremer	6,504	66.76%	3,234	33.20%	4	0.04%	0	0.00%	3,270	33.56%	9,742
Buchanan	5,179	54.90%	4,251	45.07%	3	0.03%	0	0.00%	928	9.83%	9,433
Buena Vista	6,351	63.54%	3,637	36.38%	5	0.05%	3	0.03%	2,714	27.16%	9,996
Butler	5,345	70.18%	2,268	29.78%	1	0.01%	2	0.03%	3,077	40.40%	7,616
Calhoun	4,485	58.90%	3,123	41.01%	4	0.05%	3	0.04%	1,362	17.89%	7,615
Carroll	4,648	39.66%	7,064	60.27%	6	0.05%	3	0.03%	-2,416	-20.61%	11,721
Cass	6,290	67.24%	3,059	32.70%	5	0.05%	0	0.00%	3,231	34.54%	9,354
Cedar	5,217	61.92%	3,203	38.02%	5	0.06%	0	0.00%	2,014	23.90%	8,425
Cerro Gordo	12,830	56.05%	10,044	43.88%	15	0.07%	0	0.00%	2,786	12.17%	22,889
Cherokee	4,791	59.10%	3,309	40.82%	5	0.06%	1	0.01%	1,482	18.28%	8,106
Chickasaw	3,822	48.45%	4,063	51.50%	4	0.05%	0	0.00%	-241	-3.05%	7,889
Clarke	2,631	57.82%	1,906	41.89%	12	0.26%	1	0.02%	725	15.93%	4,550
Clay	5,165	60.03%	3,437	39.95%	2	0.02%	0	0.00%	1,728	20.08%	8,604
Clayton	6,441	58.25%	4,612	41.71%	4	0.04%	0	0.00%	1,829	16.54%	11,057
Clinton	13,797	56.71%	10,508	43.19%	11	0.05%	14	0.06%	3,289	13.52%	24,330
Crawford	4,791	56.25%	3,720	43.67%	3	0.04%	4	0.05%	1,071	12.58%	8,518
Dallas	6,566	53.93%	5,597	45.97%	11	0.09%	2	0.02%	969	7.96%	12,176
Davis	2,641	53.36%	2,303	46.53%	4	0.08%	1	0.02%	338	6.83%	4,949
Decatur	3,039	55.69%	2,411	44.18%	7	0.13%	0	0.00%	628	11.51%	5,457
Delaware	5,015	57.62%	3,688	42.38%	0	0.00%	0	0.00%	1,327	15.24%	8,703
Des Moines	10,678	51.86%	9,872	47.94%	36	0.17%	5	0.02%	806	3.92%	20,591
Dickinson	3,575	56.99%	2,696	42.98%	2	0.03%	0	0.00%	879	14.01%	6,273
Dubuque	12,740	36.64%	22,007	63.30%	10	0.03%	9	0.03%	-9,267	-26.66%	34,766
Emmet	4,284	62.51%	2,563	37.40%	3	0.04%	3	0.04%	1,721	25.11%	6,853
Fayette	8,330	61.20%	5,256	38.62%	21	0.15%	4	0.03%	3,074	22.58%	13,611
Floyd	5,774	59.24%	3,970	40.73%	1	0.01%	1	0.01%	1,804	18.51%	9,746
Franklin	4,514	64.52%	2,476	35.39%	3	0.04%	3	0.04%	2,038	29.13%	6,996
Fremont	3,027	56.73%	2,307	43.23%	2	0.04%	0	0.00%	720	13.50%	5,336
Greene	4,063	58.43%	2,879	41.40%	7	0.10%	5	0.07%	1,184	17.03%	6,954
Grundy	4,989	69.62%	2,174	30.34%	3	0.04%	0	0.00%	2,815	39.28%	7,166
Guthrie	4,046	58.22%	2,896	41.68%	6	0.09%	1	0.01%	1,150	16.54%	6,949
Hamilton	5,265	57.39%	3,905	42.57%	4	0.04%	0	0.00%	1,360	14.82%	9,174
Hancock	4,179	60.24%	2,757	39.74%	1	0.01%	0	0.00%	1,422	20.50%	6,937
Hardin	6,438	62.32%	3,888	37.64%	2	0.02%	2	0.02%	2,550	24.68%	10,330
Harrison	4,940	57.70%	3,613	42.20%	8	0.09%	1	0.01%	1,327	15.50%	8,562
Henry	5,531	66.03%	2,839	33.89%	7	0.08%	0	0.00%	2,692	32.14%	8,377
Howard	3,378	49.79%	3,406	50.21%	0	0.00%	0	0.00%	-28	-0.42%	6,784
Humboldt	3,537	56.66%	2,706	43.34%	0	0.00%	0	0.00%	831	13.32%	6,243
Ida	3,290	62.77%	1,949	37.19%	2	0.04%	0	0.00%	1,341	25.58%	5,241
Iowa	4,944	63.47%	2,828	36.30%	12	0.15%	6	0.08%	2,116	27.17%	7,790
Jackson	5,084	53.89%	4,345	46.06%	4	0.04%	1	0.01%	739	7.83%	9,434
Jasper	9,332	56.27%	7,242	43.67%	8	0.05%	3	0.02%	2,090	12.60%	16,585
Jefferson	4,942	64.00%	2,780	36.00%	0	0.00%	0	0.00%	2,162	28.00%	7,722
Johnson	10,927	50.80%	10,563	49.11%	15	0.07%	3	0.01%	364	1.69%	21,508
Jones	5,541	58.52%	3,924	41.44%	3	0.03%	1	0.01%	1,617	17.08%	9,469
Keokuk	4,697	57.88%	3,408	42.00%	10	0.12%	0	0.00%	1,289	15.88%	8,115
Kossuth	6,278	51.95%	5,806	48.05%	0	0.00%	0	0.00%	472	3.90%	12,084
Lee	10,765	52.00%	9,936	48.00%	0	0.00%	0	0.00%	829	4.00%	20,701
Linn	34,200	55.30%	27,614	44.65%	17	0.03%	8	0.01%	6,586	10.65%	61,839
Louisa	3,036	60.67%	1,966	39.29%	2	0.04%	0	0.00%	1,070	21.38%	5,004
Lucas	3,512	59.88%	2,344	39.97%	9	0.15%	0	0.00%	1,168	19.91%	5,865
Lyon	4,917	73.65%	1,752	26.24%	4	0.06%	3	0.04%	3,165	47.41%	6,676
Madison	3,804	58.26%	2,722	41.69%	2	0.03%	1	0.02%	1,082	16.57%	6,529
Mahaska	7,129	65.40%	3,746	34.36%	18	0.17%	8	0.07%	3,383	31.04%	10,901
Marion	7,444	61.99%	4,547	37.87%	15	0.12%	2	0.02%	2,897	24.12%	12,008
Marshall	10,265	60.23%	6,761	39.67%	13	0.08%	3	0.02%	3,504	20.56%	17,042
Mills	3,436	65.37%	1,820	34.63%	0	0.00%	0	0.00%	1,616	30.74%	5,256
Mitchell	3,915	57.59%	2,873	42.26%	9	0.13%	1	0.01%	1,042	15.33%	6,798
Monona	3,863	54.64%	3,207	45.36%	0	0.00%	0	0.00%	656	9.28%	7,070
Monroe	2,922	54.20%	2,459	45.61%	8	0.15%	2	0.04%	463	8.59%	5,391
Montgomery	4,974	65.19%	2,655	34.80%	1	0.01%	0	0.00%	2,319	30.39%	7,630
Muscatine	8,555	58.21%	6,135	41.74%	3	0.02%	5	0.03%	2,420	16.47%	14,698
O'Brien	6,509	68.66%	2,967	31.30%	4	0.04%	0	0.00%	3,542	37.36%	9,480
Osceola	2,965	62.00%	1,814	37.93%	3	0.06%	0	0.00%	1,151	24.07%	4,782
Page	7,089	69.69%	3,075	30.23%	6	0.06%	2	0.02%	4,014	39.46%	10,172
Palo Alto	3,551	48.99%	3,695	50.97%	1	0.01%	2	0.03%	-144	-1.98%	7,249
Plymouth	6,432	57.93%	4,671	42.07%	0	0.00%	0	0.00%	1,761	15.86%	11,103
Pocahontas	3,445	50.23%	3,408	49.69%	5	0.07%	1	0.01%	37	0.54%	6,859
Polk	64,077	53.74%	55,091	46.20%	37	0.03%	29	0.02%	8,986	7.54%	119,234
Pottawattamie	19,223	57.79%	14,025	42.17%	8	0.02%	5	0.02%	5,198	15.62%	33,261
Poweshiek	5,232	58.76%	3,671	41.23%	1	0.01%	0	0.00%	1,561	17.53%	8,904
Ringgold	2,538	58.74%	1,781	41.22%	1	0.02%	1	0.02%	757	17.52%	4,321
Sac	4,850	61.36%	3,054	38.64%	0	0.00%	0	0.00%	1,796	22.72%	7,904
Scott	27,617	54.50%	23,004	45.40%	34	0.07%	16	0.03%	4,613	9.10%	50,671
Shelby	4,210	55.08%	3,427	44.83%	5	0.07%	2	0.03%	783	10.25%	7,644
Sioux	10,284	79.51%	2,643	20.43%	5	0.04%	2	0.02%	7,641	59.08%	12,934
Story	13,708	65.26%	7,281	34.66%	10	0.05%	5	0.02%	6,427	30.60%	21,004
Tama	5,535	52.78%	4,950	47.21%	1	0.01%	0	0.00%	585	5.57%	10,486
Taylor	3,452	61.85%	2,126	38.09%	3	0.05%	0	0.00%	1,326	23.76%	5,581
Union	4,417	61.85%	2,720	38.08%	3	0.04%	2	0.03%	1,697	23.77%	7,142
Van Buren	3,129	63.94%	1,760	35.96%	3	0.06%	2	0.04%	1,369	27.98%	4,894
Wapello	11,036	49.79%	11,116	50.15%	8	0.04%	7	0.03%	-80	-0.36%	22,167
Warren	6,013	59.25%	4,136	40.75%	0	0.00%	0	0.00%	1,877	18.50%	10,149
Washington	5,861	64.48%	3,222	35.45%	5	0.06%	1	0.01%	2,639	29.03%	9,089
Wayne	3,401	59.51%	2,307	40.37%	5	0.09%	2	0.03%	1,094	19.14%	5,715
Webster	10,741	50.11%	10,680	49.83%	12	0.06%	2	0.01%	61	0.28%	21,435
Winnebago	4,082	62.33%	2,463	37.61%	4	0.06%	0	0.00%	1,619	24.72%	6,549
Winneshiek	5,737	54.48%	4,786	45.45%	5	0.05%	2	0.02%	951	9.03%	10,530
Woodbury	26,832	55.05%	21,906	44.94%	4	0.01%	2	0.00%	4,926	10.11%	48,744
Worth	2,740	54.28%	2,303	45.62%	5	0.10%	0	0.00%	437	8.66%	5,048
Wright	5,386	56.34%	4,159	43.50%	15	0.16%	0	0.00%	1,227	12.84%	9,560
Totals	722,381	56.71%	550,565	43.22%	634	0.05%	230	0.02%	171,816	13.49%	1,273,810

==== Counties that flipped from Republican to Democratic ====
- Caroll
- Chickasaw
- Dubuque
- Howard
- Palo Alto

== See also ==
- United States presidential elections in Iowa
