= Oxford Township, Johnson County, Iowa =

Township in Johnson County, Iowa, U.S.

Coordinates: 41.7406°N 91.7664°W

Oxford Township is a township in Johnson County, Iowa, United States.

== History ==
Oxford Township was organized in 1856. It is named from Oxford, New York.
