= Clear Creek Township, Johnson County, Iowa =

Township in Johnson County, Iowa, U.S.

Coordinates: 41.7017°N 91.6575°W

Clear Creek Township is a township in Johnson County, Iowa, United States.

== History ==
Clear Creek Township was organized in 1846.
