= Madison Township, Johnson County, Iowa =

Township in Johnson County, Iowa, U.S.

Coordinates: 41.7686°N 91.6694°W

Madison Township is a township in Johnson County, Iowa, United States.

== History ==
Madison Township was organized in 1860.
