= Liberty Township, Johnson County, Iowa =

Township in Johnson County, Iowa, U.S.

Coordinates: 41.5511°N 91.5683°W

Liberty Township is a township in Johnson County, Iowa, United States.

== History ==
Liberty Township was organized in 1846.
