= Cedar Township, Johnson County, Iowa =

Township in Johnson County, Iowa, U.S.

Coordinates: 41.8144°N 91.4269°W

Cedar Township is a township in Johnson County, Iowa, United States.

== History ==
Cedar Township was organized in 1846.
