= Sharon Center, Iowa =

- Unincorporated community
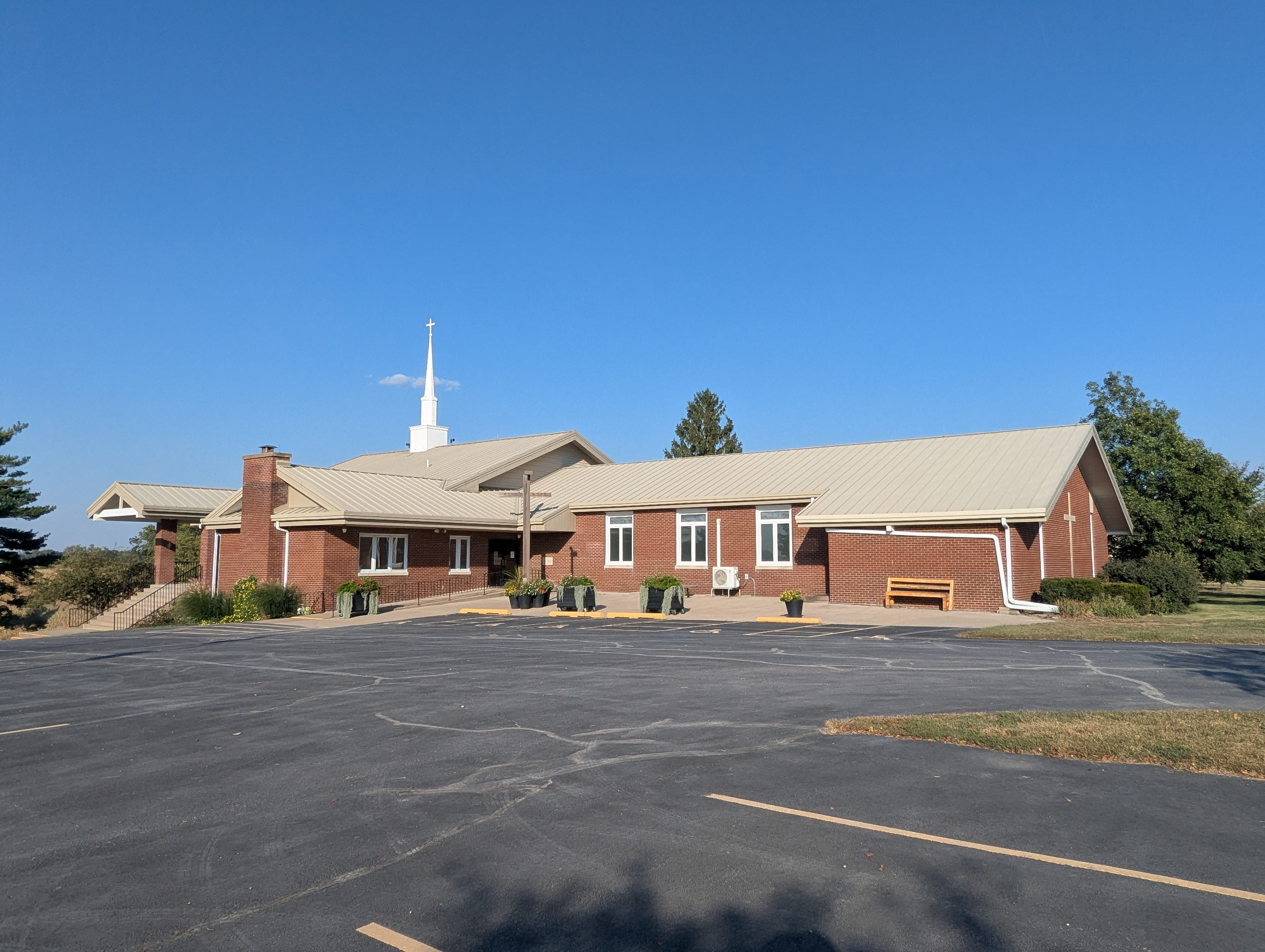
- The United Methodist Church in Sharon Center

- Location within Iowa Location within the United States
- Coordinates: 41°34′09″N 91°39′41″W
- Country: United States
- State: Iowa
- County: Johnson
- Elevation: 755 ft (230 m)
- Time zone: UTC-6 (Central (CST))
  - Summer (DST): UTC-5 (CDT)
- Area code: 319
- GNIS feature ID: 461533

Sharon Center is an unincorporated community in Johnson County, Iowa, United States. Sharon Center is located at the junction of County Highways F62 and W62, 9.3 miles (15.0 km) southwest of Iowa City.

== History ==
Founded in the 1800s, Sharon Center's population was 27 in 1902. The population was 184 in 1940.
