= Big Grove Township, Johnson County, Iowa =

Township in Johnson County, Iowa, U.S.

Coordinates: 41.8158°N 91.5394°W

Big Grove Township is a township in Johnson County, Iowa, United States.

== History ==
Big Grove Township was organized in 1845.
