= Old Mans Creek =

Stream in Iowa, U.S.

Coordinates: 41°32′24″N 91°31′35″W

Old Mans Creek is a stream in the U.S. state of Iowa. It is a tributary to the Iowa River.

According to tradition, Old Mans Creek was so named because it was where Native American elderly men, women, and children hid out during tribal wars.

The Meskwaki called the creek, Push-i-to-nock See-po. (From the Rohret Family History book).
