= Washington Township, Johnson County, Iowa =

Township in Johnson County, Iowa, U.S.

Coordinates: 41.5558°N 91.7706°W

Washington Township is a township in Johnson County, Iowa, United States. In 2021, its population was 1,108.

== History ==
Washington Township was organized in 1846.
