= 1944 United States presidential election in Iowa =

- November 7, 1944

All 10 Iowa votes to the Electoral College

| Nominee | Thomas E. Dewey | Franklin D. Roosevelt |
| Party | Republican | Democratic |
| Home state | New York | New York |
| Running mate | John W. Bricker | Harry S. Truman |
| Electoral vote | 10 | 0 |
| Popular vote | 547,267 | 499,876 |
| Percentage | 51.99% | 47.49% |
County results
Dewey
40–50%
50–60%
60–70%
Roosevelt
50–60%
President before election
Franklin D. Roosevelt
Democratic
Elected President
Franklin D. Roosevelt
Democratic

The 1944 United States presidential election in Iowa took place on November 7, 1944, as part of the 1944 United States presidential election. Iowa voters chose ten representatives, or electors, to the Electoral College, who voted for president and vice president.

Iowa was won by Governor Thomas E. Dewey (R–New York), running with Governor John Bricker, with 51.99% of the popular vote, against incumbent President Franklin D. Roosevelt (D–New York), running with Senator Harry S. Truman, with 47.49% of the popular vote. As of 2025, this, is the last election in which an incumbent president of either party won another term in office without winning Iowa, as well as the only election in which the state backed the losing candidate more than once consecutively.

== Results ==
1944 United States presidential election in Iowa
| Party | Candidate | Votes | % |
|---|---|---|---|
| Republican | Thomas E. Dewey | 547,267 | 51.99% |
| Democratic | Franklin D. Roosevelt (inc.) | 499,876 | 47.49% |
| Prohibition | Claude A. Watson | 3,752 | 0.36% |
| Socialist | Norman Thomas | 1,511 | 0.14% |
| Socialist Labor | Edward A. Teichert | 193 | 0.02% |
| Total votes | | 1,052,599 | 100% |

=== Results by county ===
| County | Thomas E. Dewey Republican | | Franklin D. Roosevelt Democratic | | Claude A. Watson Prohibition | | Norman Thomas Socialist | | Edward A. Teichert Socialist Labor | | Margin | | Total votes cast |
| County | # | % | # | % | # | % | # | % | # | % | # | % | Total votes cast |
|---|---|---|---|---|---|---|---|---|---|---|---|---|---|
| Adair | 3,428 | 59.69% | 2,297 | 40.00% | 11 | 0.19% | 4 | 0.07% | 3 | 0.05% | 1,131 | 19.69% | 5,743 |
| Adams | 2,540 | 57.56% | 1,868 | 42.33% | 5 | 0.11% | 0 | 0.00% | 0 | 0.00% | 672 | 15.23% | 4,413 |
| Allamakee | 5,017 | 63.27% | 2,893 | 36.49% | 9 | 0.11% | 8 | 0.10% | 2 | 0.03% | 2,124 | 26.79% | 7,929 |
| Appanoose | 4,928 | 49.18% | 5,015 | 50.05% | 69 | 0.69% | 6 | 0.06% | 2 | 0.02% | -87 | -0.87% | 10,020 |
| Audubon | 2,346 | 43.07% | 3,094 | 56.80% | 6 | 0.11% | 1 | 0.02% | 0 | 0.00% | -748 | -13.73% | 5,447 |
| Benton | 4,378 | 48.43% | 4,619 | 51.10% | 21 | 0.23% | 17 | 0.19% | 4 | 0.04% | -241 | -2.67% | 9,039 |
| Black Hawk | 15,687 | 48.37% | 16,593 | 51.16% | 99 | 0.31% | 34 | 0.10% | 21 | 0.06% | -906 | -2.79% | 32,434 |
| Boone | 4,868 | 44.24% | 6,062 | 55.09% | 41 | 0.37% | 30 | 0.27% | 2 | 0.02% | -1,194 | -10.85% | 11,003 |
| Bremer | 4,861 | 63.61% | 2,764 | 36.17% | 8 | 0.10% | 9 | 0.12% | 0 | 0.00% | 2,097 | 27.44% | 7,642 |
| Buchanan | 4,653 | 54.69% | 3,841 | 45.15% | 12 | 0.14% | 2 | 0.02% | 0 | 0.00% | 812 | 9.54% | 8,508 |
| Buena Vista | 3,993 | 48.06% | 4,277 | 51.47% | 26 | 0.31% | 12 | 0.14% | 1 | 0.01% | -284 | -3.42% | 8,309 |
| Butler | 4,182 | 65.03% | 2,225 | 34.60% | 13 | 0.20% | 10 | 0.16% | 1 | 0.02% | 1,957 | 30.43% | 6,431 |
| Calhoun | 3,375 | 48.59% | 3,544 | 51.02% | 18 | 0.26% | 8 | 0.12% | 1 | 0.01% | -169 | -2.43% | 6,946 |
| Carroll | 4,833 | 50.04% | 4,799 | 49.68% | 19 | 0.20% | 8 | 0.08% | 0 | 0.00% | 34 | 0.35% | 9,659 |
| Cass | 5,610 | 65.53% | 2,928 | 34.20% | 17 | 0.20% | 6 | 0.07% | 0 | 0.00% | 2,682 | 31.33% | 8,561 |
| Cedar | 4,673 | 63.95% | 2,610 | 35.72% | 12 | 0.16% | 12 | 0.16% | 0 | 0.00% | 2,063 | 28.23% | 7,307 |
| Cerro Gordo | 8,311 | 47.60% | 9,088 | 52.05% | 30 | 0.17% | 19 | 0.11% | 11 | 0.06% | -777 | -4.45% | 17,459 |
| Cherokee | 3,723 | 53.58% | 3,197 | 46.01% | 17 | 0.24% | 10 | 0.14% | 2 | 0.03% | 526 | 7.57% | 6,949 |
| Chickasaw | 3,575 | 51.59% | 3,328 | 48.03% | 18 | 0.26% | 8 | 0.12% | 0 | 0.00% | 247 | 3.56% | 6,929 |
| Clarke | 2,603 | 56.78% | 1,946 | 42.45% | 30 | 0.65% | 5 | 0.11% | 0 | 0.00% | 657 | 14.33% | 4,584 |
| Clay | 3,055 | 45.43% | 3,639 | 54.12% | 19 | 0.28% | 11 | 0.16% | 0 | 0.00% | -584 | -8.69% | 6,724 |
| Clayton | 5,855 | 57.61% | 4,259 | 41.91% | 45 | 0.44% | 4 | 0.04% | 0 | 0.00% | 1,596 | 15.70% | 10,163 |
| Clinton | 11,533 | 58.77% | 8,028 | 40.91% | 12 | 0.06% | 32 | 0.16% | 19 | 0.10% | 3,505 | 17.86% | 19,624 |
| Crawford | 4,242 | 56.49% | 3,218 | 42.86% | 23 | 0.31% | 14 | 0.19% | 12 | 0.16% | 1,024 | 13.64% | 7,509 |
| Dallas | 5,413 | 49.83% | 5,316 | 48.93% | 113 | 1.04% | 22 | 0.20% | 0 | 0.00% | 97 | 0.89% | 10,864 |
| Davis | 2,559 | 48.12% | 2,727 | 51.28% | 29 | 0.55% | 2 | 0.04% | 1 | 0.02% | -168 | -3.16% | 5,318 |
| Decatur | 2,934 | 46.81% | 3,316 | 52.90% | 17 | 0.27% | 1 | 0.02% | 0 | 0.00% | -382 | -6.09% | 6,268 |
| Delaware | 5,164 | 67.22% | 2,498 | 32.52% | 14 | 0.18% | 5 | 0.07% | 1 | 0.01% | 2,666 | 34.70% | 7,682 |
| Des Moines | 9,488 | 55.24% | 7,543 | 43.91% | 48 | 0.28% | 96 | 0.56% | 2 | 0.01% | 1,945 | 11.32% | 17,177 |
| Dickinson | 2,133 | 46.10% | 2,473 | 53.45% | 9 | 0.19% | 11 | 0.24% | 1 | 0.02% | -340 | -7.35% | 4,627 |
| Dubuque | 12,502 | 49.11% | 12,867 | 50.54% | 21 | 0.08% | 58 | 0.23% | 10 | 0.04% | -365 | -1.43% | 25,458 |
| Emmet | 2,668 | 50.47% | 2,577 | 48.75% | 32 | 0.61% | 7 | 0.13% | 2 | 0.04% | 91 | 1.72% | 5,286 |
| Fayette | 6,693 | 56.50% | 5,105 | 43.09% | 33 | 0.28% | 15 | 0.13% | 0 | 0.00% | 1,588 | 13.41% | 11,846 |
| Floyd | 5,248 | 60.11% | 3,446 | 39.47% | 28 | 0.32% | 7 | 0.08% | 2 | 0.02% | 1,802 | 20.64% | 8,731 |
| Franklin | 3,150 | 51.96% | 2,851 | 47.03% | 41 | 0.68% | 20 | 0.33% | 0 | 0.00% | 299 | 4.93% | 6,062 |
| Fremont | 3,113 | 52.97% | 2,747 | 46.74% | 15 | 0.26% | 2 | 0.03% | 0 | 0.00% | 366 | 6.23% | 5,877 |
| Greene | 3,437 | 54.88% | 2,797 | 44.66% | 19 | 0.30% | 10 | 0.16% | 0 | 0.00% | 640 | 10.22% | 6,263 |
| Grundy | 3,625 | 62.14% | 2,191 | 37.56% | 9 | 0.15% | 9 | 0.15% | 0 | 0.00% | 1,434 | 24.58% | 5,834 |
| Guthrie | 4,042 | 57.93% | 2,899 | 41.55% | 27 | 0.39% | 8 | 0.11% | 1 | 0.01% | 1,143 | 16.38% | 6,977 |
| Hamilton | 3,837 | 46.91% | 4,302 | 52.59% | 32 | 0.39% | 8 | 0.10% | 1 | 0.01% | -465 | -5.68% | 8,180 |
| Hancock | 3,114 | 51.87% | 2,855 | 47.56% | 24 | 0.40% | 9 | 0.15% | 1 | 0.02% | 259 | 4.31% | 6,003 |
| Hardin | 5,059 | 55.63% | 3,975 | 43.71% | 25 | 0.27% | 35 | 0.38% | 0 | 0.00% | 1,084 | 11.92% | 9,094 |
| Harrison | 5,059 | 54.35% | 4,201 | 45.13% | 44 | 0.47% | 5 | 0.05% | 0 | 0.00% | 858 | 9.22% | 9,309 |
| Henry | 5,028 | 64.31% | 2,741 | 35.06% | 45 | 0.58% | 4 | 0.05% | 0 | 0.00% | 2,287 | 29.25% | 7,818 |
| Howard | 2,961 | 48.43% | 3,132 | 51.23% | 18 | 0.29% | 2 | 0.03% | 1 | 0.02% | -171 | -2.80% | 6,114 |
| Humboldt | 2,525 | 47.73% | 2,749 | 51.97% | 13 | 0.25% | 3 | 0.06% | 0 | 0.00% | -224 | -4.23% | 5,290 |
| Ida | 2,640 | 57.38% | 1,943 | 42.23% | 13 | 0.28% | 5 | 0.11% | 0 | 0.00% | 697 | 15.15% | 4,601 |
| Iowa | 3,959 | 53.94% | 3,119 | 42.49% | 249 | 3.39% | 12 | 0.16% | 1 | 0.01% | 840 | 11.44% | 7,340 |
| Jackson | 4,341 | 55.05% | 3,537 | 44.85% | 3 | 0.04% | 5 | 0.06% | 0 | 0.00% | 804 | 10.20% | 7,886 |
| Jasper | 6,413 | 47.58% | 6,978 | 51.77% | 64 | 0.47% | 22 | 0.16% | 2 | 0.01% | -565 | -4.19% | 13,479 |
| Jefferson | 4,335 | 59.03% | 2,926 | 39.84% | 78 | 1.06% | 4 | 0.05% | 1 | 0.01% | 1,409 | 19.19% | 7,344 |
| Johnson | 6,396 | 42.93% | 8,434 | 56.62% | 35 | 0.23% | 31 | 0.21% | 1 | 0.01% | -2,038 | -13.68% | 14,897 |
| Jones | 4,453 | 55.44% | 3,563 | 44.36% | 6 | 0.07% | 8 | 0.10% | 2 | 0.02% | 890 | 11.08% | 8,032 |
| Keokuk | 4,644 | 53.96% | 3,900 | 45.32% | 53 | 0.62% | 9 | 0.10% | 0 | 0.00% | 744 | 8.65% | 8,606 |
| Kossuth | 4,918 | 47.14% | 5,488 | 52.60% | 23 | 0.22% | 2 | 0.02% | 2 | 0.02% | -570 | -5.46% | 10,433 |
| Lee | 9,406 | 53.03% | 8,252 | 46.53% | 59 | 0.33% | 19 | 0.11% | 0 | 0.00% | 1,154 | 6.51% | 17,736 |
| Linn | 21,293 | 50.03% | 21,123 | 49.63% | 88 | 0.21% | 50 | 0.12% | 8 | 0.02% | 170 | 0.40% | 42,562 |
| Louisa | 2,745 | 58.67% | 1,894 | 40.48% | 37 | 0.79% | 3 | 0.06% | 0 | 0.00% | 851 | 18.19% | 4,679 |
| Lucas | 3,139 | 54.94% | 2,526 | 44.21% | 44 | 0.77% | 3 | 0.05% | 1 | 0.02% | 613 | 10.73% | 5,713 |
| Lyon | 3,065 | 60.79% | 1,970 | 39.07% | 4 | 0.08% | 3 | 0.06% | 0 | 0.00% | 1,095 | 21.72% | 5,042 |
| Madison | 3,737 | 59.20% | 2,550 | 40.39% | 25 | 0.40% | 1 | 0.02% | 0 | 0.00% | 1,187 | 18.80% | 6,313 |
| Mahaska | 5,123 | 50.86% | 4,652 | 46.19% | 266 | 2.64% | 29 | 0.29% | 2 | 0.02% | 471 | 4.68% | 10,072 |
| Marion | 4,874 | 42.99% | 6,365 | 56.14% | 83 | 0.73% | 15 | 0.13% | 1 | 0.01% | -1,491 | -13.15% | 11,338 |
| Marshall | 7,325 | 55.67% | 5,598 | 42.55% | 204 | 1.55% | 26 | 0.20% | 4 | 0.03% | 1,727 | 13.13% | 13,157 |
| Mills | 3,288 | 60.65% | 2,106 | 38.85% | 23 | 0.42% | 4 | 0.07% | 0 | 0.00% | 1,182 | 21.80% | 5,421 |
| Mitchell | 3,406 | 55.54% | 2,696 | 43.97% | 19 | 0.31% | 7 | 0.11% | 4 | 0.07% | 710 | 11.58% | 6,132 |
| Monona | 3,583 | 48.64% | 3,761 | 51.06% | 17 | 0.23% | 5 | 0.07% | 0 | 0.00% | -178 | -2.42% | 7,366 |
| Monroe | 2,625 | 44.41% | 3,258 | 55.12% | 13 | 0.22% | 12 | 0.20% | 3 | 0.05% | -633 | -10.71% | 5,911 |
| Montgomery | 4,165 | 61.40% | 2,572 | 37.92% | 41 | 0.60% | 4 | 0.06% | 1 | 0.01% | 1,593 | 23.49% | 6,783 |
| Muscatine | 7,104 | 59.38% | 4,801 | 40.13% | 23 | 0.19% | 35 | 0.29% | 0 | 0.00% | 2,303 | 19.25% | 11,963 |
| O'Brien | 4,033 | 56.01% | 3,138 | 43.58% | 14 | 0.19% | 16 | 0.22% | 0 | 0.00% | 895 | 12.43% | 7,201 |
| Osceola | 2,100 | 55.29% | 1,689 | 44.47% | 6 | 0.16% | 3 | 0.08% | 0 | 0.00% | 411 | 10.82% | 3,798 |
| Page | 6,300 | 65.07% | 3,297 | 34.05% | 74 | 0.76% | 9 | 0.09% | 2 | 0.02% | 3,003 | 31.02% | 9,682 |
| Palo Alto | 2,772 | 42.43% | 3,726 | 57.03% | 25 | 0.38% | 10 | 0.15% | 0 | 0.00% | -954 | -14.60% | 6,533 |
| Plymouth | 6,085 | 67.04% | 2,970 | 32.72% | 13 | 0.14% | 5 | 0.06% | 3 | 0.03% | 3,115 | 34.32% | 9,076 |
| Pocahontas | 2,600 | 41.94% | 3,577 | 57.70% | 14 | 0.23% | 8 | 0.13% | 0 | 0.00% | -977 | -15.76% | 6,199 |
| Polk | 36,629 | 44.07% | 46,072 | 55.43% | 215 | 0.26% | 183 | 0.22% | 19 | 0.02% | -9,443 | -11.36% | 83,118 |
| Pottawattamie | 14,007 | 54.25% | 11,752 | 45.52% | 31 | 0.12% | 27 | 0.10% | 1 | 0.00% | 2,255 | 8.73% | 25,818 |
| Poweshiek | 4,186 | 49.47% | 4,234 | 50.04% | 31 | 0.37% | 10 | 0.12% | 0 | 0.00% | -48 | -0.57% | 8,461 |
| Ringgold | 2,767 | 59.35% | 1,867 | 40.05% | 26 | 0.56% | 2 | 0.04% | 0 | 0.00% | 900 | 19.31% | 4,662 |
| Sac | 3,770 | 53.63% | 3,223 | 45.85% | 33 | 0.47% | 3 | 0.04% | 1 | 0.01% | 547 | 7.78% | 7,030 |
| Scott | 18,015 | 48.58% | 18,962 | 51.14% | 16 | 0.04% | 81 | 0.22% | 7 | 0.02% | -947 | -2.55% | 37,081 |
| Shelby | 3,873 | 55.86% | 2,978 | 42.95% | 80 | 1.15% | 2 | 0.03% | 0 | 0.00% | 895 | 12.91% | 6,933 |
| Sioux | 6,552 | 65.92% | 3,369 | 33.89% | 13 | 0.13% | 6 | 0.06% | 0 | 0.00% | 3,183 | 32.02% | 9,940 |
| Story | 7,163 | 51.84% | 6,554 | 47.43% | 39 | 0.28% | 59 | 0.43% | 3 | 0.02% | 609 | 4.41% | 13,818 |
| Tama | 5,249 | 49.67% | 5,286 | 50.02% | 18 | 0.17% | 14 | 0.13% | 0 | 0.00% | -37 | -0.35% | 10,567 |
| Taylor | 3,804 | 61.35% | 2,376 | 38.32% | 19 | 0.31% | 1 | 0.02% | 0 | 0.00% | 1,428 | 23.03% | 6,200 |
| Union | 4,566 | 61.29% | 2,861 | 38.40% | 17 | 0.23% | 5 | 0.07% | 1 | 0.01% | 1,705 | 22.89% | 7,450 |
| Van Buren | 3,095 | 60.43% | 1,997 | 38.99% | 28 | 0.55% | 2 | 0.04% | 0 | 0.00% | 1,098 | 21.44% | 5,122 |
| Wapello | 8,244 | 44.02% | 10,732 | 55.38% | 79 | 0.42% | 25 | 0.13% | 9 | 0.05% | -2,128 | -11.36% | 18,729 |
| Warren | 4,266 | 55.83% | 3,319 | 43.44% | 44 | 0.58% | 11 | 0.14% | 1 | 0.01% | 947 | 12.39% | 7,641 |
| Washington | 5,308 | 60.57% | 3,423 | 39.06% | 28 | 0.32% | 4 | 0.05% | 0 | 0.00% | 1,885 | 21.51% | 8,763 |
| Wayne | 3,098 | 50.31% | 3,025 | 49.12% | 31 | 0.50% | 4 | 0.06% | 0 | 0.00% | 73 | 1.19% | 6,158 |
| Webster | 6,935 | 42.11% | 9,477 | 57.55% | 28 | 0.17% | 26 | 0.16% | 2 | 0.01% | -2,542 | -15.44% | 16,468 |
| Winnebago | 2,808 | 51.24% | 2,654 | 48.43% | 16 | 0.29% | 2 | 0.04% | 0 | 0.00% | 154 | 2.81% | 5,480 |
| Winneshiek | 5,318 | 53.76% | 4,557 | 46.06% | 9 | 0.09% | 8 | 0.08% | 1 | 0.01% | 761 | 7.69% | 9,893 |
| Woodbury | 18,544 | 47.43% | 20,448 | 52.30% | 47 | 0.12% | 52 | 0.13% | 5 | 0.01% | -1,904 | -4.87% | 39,096 |
| Worth | 2,086 | 44.15% | 2,629 | 55.64% | 10 | 0.21% | 0 | 0.00% | 0 | 0.00% | -543 | -11.49% | 4,725 |
| Wright | 3,916 | 47.86% | 4,232 | 51.72% | 24 | 0.29% | 10 | 0.12% | 1 | 0.01% | -316 | -3.86% | 8,183 |
| Totals | 547,267 | 51.99% | 499,876 | 47.49% | 3,752 | 0.36% | 1,511 | 0.14% | 193 | 0.02% | 47,391 | 4.50% | 1,052,599 |

==== Counties that flipped from Democratic to Republican ====
- Carroll
- Dallas
- Emmet
- Fremont

==== Counties that flipped from Republican to Democratic ====
- Dubuque
- Howard

== See also ==
- United States presidential elections in Iowa
