= Johnson County, Iowa =

County in Iowa, United States

- County
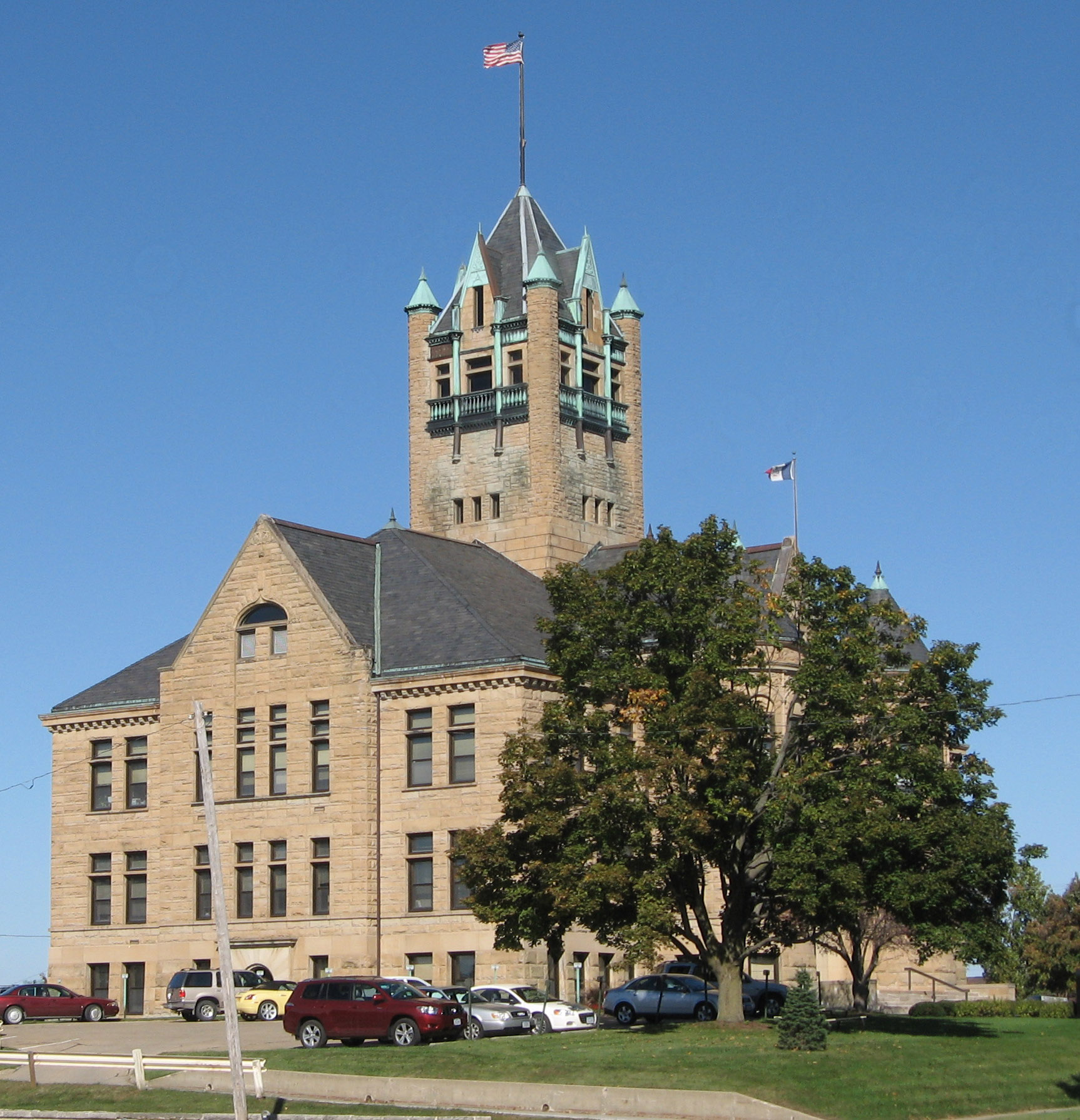
- The Johnson County Courthouse in Iowa City

- Seal

- Location within the U.S. state of Iowa
- Coordinates: 41.670668°N 91.590529°W
- Country: United States
- State: Iowa
- Founded: December 21, 1837 (created); July 4, 1838 (organized)
- Named for: Richard Mentor Johnson (1837–2020); Lulu Johnson (since 2020)
- Seat: Iowa City
- Largest city: Iowa City

Area
  - Total: 623.063 sq mi (1,613.73 km^{2})
  - Land: 612.997 sq mi (1,587.65 km^{2})
  - Water: 10.066 sq mi (26.07 km^{2}) 1.62%

Population (2020)
  - Total: 152,854
  - Estimate (2025): 160,044 ▲
  - Density: 249.355/sq mi (96.2766/km^{2})
- Time zone: UTC−6 (Central)
  - Summer (DST): UTC−5 (CDT)
- Area code: 319
- Congressional district: 1st
- Website: johnsoncountyiowa.gov
- Iowa county number 52

Johnson County is located in the U.S. state of Iowa. As of the 2020 census, the population was 152,854, and was estimated to be 160,044 in 2025, making it the fourth-most populous county in Iowa. The county seat and the largest city is Iowa City, home of the University of Iowa. Johnson County is included in the Iowa City metropolitan area, which is also included in the Cedar Rapids-Iowa City Corridor Combined Statistical Area.

== History ==
Johnson County was established on December 21, 1837, by the legislature of the Wisconsin Territory, one of thirteen counties established by that body in a comprehensive act. The county's area was partitioned from Dubuque County and was not initially provided with a civil government, instead being governed by Cedar County officials. It was originally named for the United States Vice President Richard M. Johnson (1780–1850). In 2020, the Johnson County Board of Supervisors voted unanimously to change the county's namesake to be Lulu Merle Johnson (1907–1995), the first black woman in the state to earn a doctorate. Vice President Johnson had a common law enslaved wife (Julia Chinn) whom he could not marry since it was against the law at that time to have an interracial marriage. They had two children together and she was in charge of his plantation when he was away on business. He was open about his relationship with her, which was unusual for the time. Another motivation for the changing of the county namesake was Johnson's killing of numerous Native Americans during battles, including Tecumseh, and Johnson's enslavement of many people, including Chinn.

The first courthouse in the county was a two-story log cabin structure, built in 1838 in the settlement of Napoleon, about two miles south of the current courthouse. The building stood across from what later would become the James McCollister Farmstead on land later owned by Philip Clark.

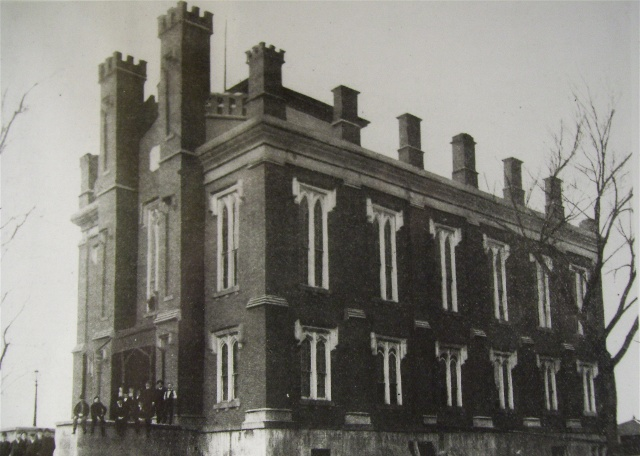
Old Johnson County Courthouse, Iowa City, 1857-1899

After Iowa City was established by fiat as the new territorial capitol of Iowa, the county seat was removed there. The second Johnson County Courthouse, the first in Iowa City, was built on Lot 8 Block 8 of the County Seat Addition to Iowa City in 1842 for $3,690. This location was in the southeast corner of the intersection of Harrison and Clinton Streets. The building was 56 x 28 feet and two stories tall. It was built by James Trimble, who had previously built the first jail.

A third courthouse was built in 1857 in the courthouse square on Clinton Street between Court and Harrison Streets. It was used until 1901, after cracks appeared in its south wall in 1899. The building was apparently built of brick with stone and wood ornamentation.

The Richardsonian Romanesque style courthouse in use today was designed by the firm of Rush, Bowman and Rush of Grand Rapids, Michigan. It was bid for $111,000 and built by the firm Rowson & Son of Johnson County. The cornerstone was laid in December 1899. The building's tower was based on Henry Hobson Richardson's design for the spire of Trinity Church in Boston. The building was dedicated on June 8, 1901. The currently unused jail that stands to the west of the courthouse was designed by C.L. Wundt of Burlington, Iowa, on behalf of the Stewart Iron Works in Cleveland with a bid of $14,000.

== Geography ==
According to the United States Census Bureau, the county has a total area of 623.063 square miles (1,613.73 km^{2}), of which 612.997 square miles (1,587.65 km^{2}) is land and 10.066 square miles (26.07 km^{2}) (1.62%) is water. It is the 20th largest county in Iowa by total area.

=== Major highways ===
- Interstate 80
- Interstate 380
- U.S. Highway 6
- U.S. Highway 218
- Iowa Highway 1
- Iowa Highway 22
- Iowa Highway 27

=== Transit ===
- 380 Express
- Cambus
- Coralville Transit
- Iowa City Transit

=== Adjacent counties ===
- Benton County – northwest
- Cedar County – east
- Iowa County – west
- Linn County – north
- Muscatine County – east and southeast
- Louisa County – southeast and south
- Washington County – south

== Demographics ==
Historical population
Census	Pop.	Note	%±
1850	4,472		—
1860	17,573		293.0%
1870	24,898		41.7%
1880	25,429		2.1%
1890	23,082		−9.2%
1900	24,817		7.5%
1910	25,914		4.4%
1920	26,462		2.1%
1930	30,276		14.4%
1940	33,191		9.6%
1950	45,756		37.9%
1960	53,663		17.3%
1970	72,127		34.4%
1980	81,717		13.3%
1990	96,119		17.6%
2000	111,006		15.5%
2010	130,882		17.9%
2020	152,854		16.8%
2025 (est.)	160,044	▲	4.7%
U.S. Decennial Census; 1790–1960 1900–1990; 1990–2000 2010–2020

As of the second quarter of 2025, the median home value in Johnson County was $343,126.

As of the 2024 American Community Survey, there are 66,816 estimated households in Johnson County with an average of 2.26 persons per household. The county has a median household income of $74,575. Approximately 18.4% of the county's population lives at or below the poverty line. Johnson County has an estimated 67.5% employment rate, with 55.7% of the population holding a bachelor's degree or higher and 95.4% holding a high school diploma. There were 70,516 housing units at an average density of 115.03 per square mile (44.4/km^{2}).

The top five reported languages (people were allowed to report up to two languages, thus the figures will generally add to more than 100%) were English (85.1%), Spanish (4.7%), Indo-European (4.1%), Asian and Pacific Islander (3.9%), and Other (2.2%).

The median age in the county was 32.1 years.

Johnson County, Iowa – racial and ethnic composition Note: the US Census treats Hispanic/Latino as an ethnic category. This table excludes Latinos from the racial categories and assigns them to a separate category. Hispanics/Latinos may be of any race.
Race / ethnicity (NH = non-Hispanic)	Pop. 1980	Pop. 1990	Pop. 2000	Pop. 2010	Pop. 2020
White alone (NH)	77,755 (95.15%)	88,705 (92.29%)	98,619 (88.84%)	108,767 (83.10%)	114,491 (74.90%)
Black or African American alone (NH)	1,182 (1.45%)	1,941 (2.02%)	3,148 (2.84%)	6,163 (4.71%)	12,643 (8.27%)
Native American or Alaska Native alone (NH)	126 (0.15%)	161 (0.17%)	282 (0.25%)	226 (0.17%)	193 (0.13%)
Asian alone (NH)	1,348 (1.65%)	3,808 (3.96%)	4,557 (4.11%)	6,774 (5.18%)	8,555 (5.60%)
Pacific Islander alone (NH)	—	—	46 (0.04%)	47 (0.04%)	41 (0.03%)
Other race alone (NH)	477 (0.58%)	69 (0.07%)	166 (0.15%)	230 (0.18%)	534 (0.35%)
Mixed race or multiracial (NH)	—	—	1,407 (1.27%)	2,475 (1.89%)	6,199 (4.06%)
Hispanic or Latino (any race)	829 (1.01%)	1,435 (1.49%)	2,781 (2.51%)	6,200 (4.74%)	10,198 (6.67%)
Total	81,717 (100.00%)	96,119 (100.00%)	111,006 (100.00%)	130,882 (100.00%)	152,854 (100.00%)

=== 2020 census ===
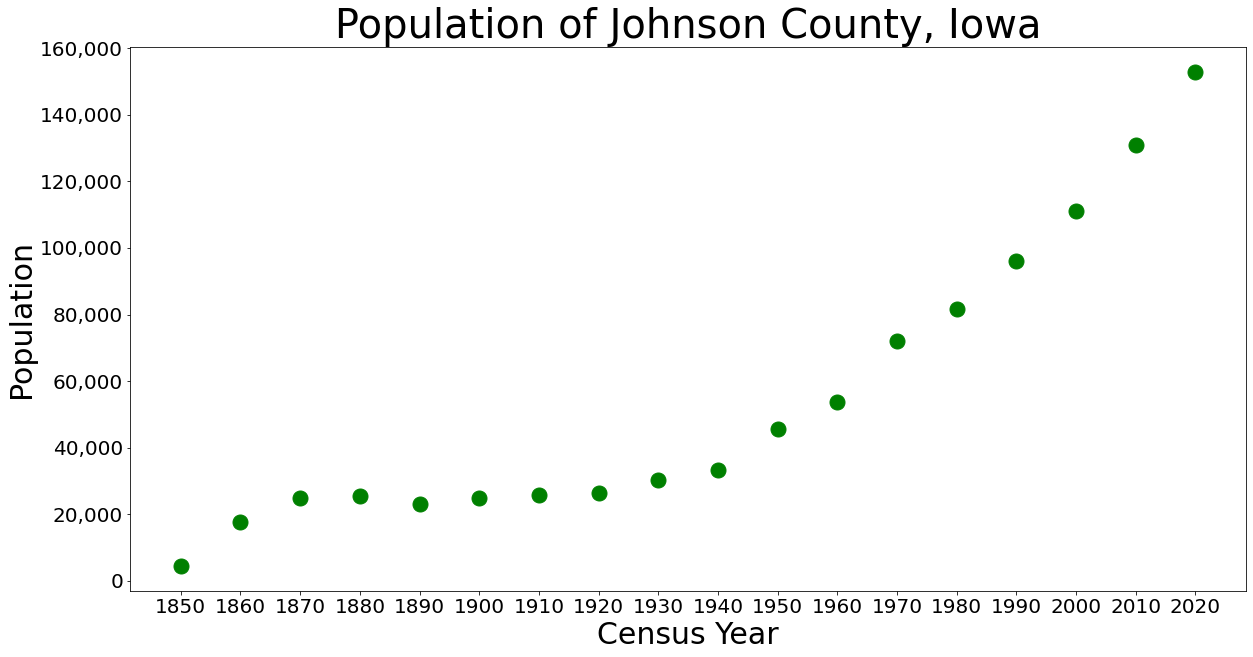
Population of Johnson County from the U.S. census data

As of the 2020 census, there were 152,854 people, 61,335 households, and 32,889 families residing in the county. The population density was 249.36 inhabitants per square mile (96.3/km^{2}). There were 65,916 housing units at an average density of 107.53 per square mile (41.5/km^{2}). The racial makeup of the county was 76.60% White, 8.40% African American, 0.21% Native American, 5.63% Asian, 0.03% Pacific Islander, 2.75% from some other races and 6.38% from two or more races. Hispanic or Latino people of any race were 6.67% of the population.

The median age was 31.2 years, with 20.1% of residents under the age of 18 and 12.6% of residents 65 years of age or older. For every 100 females there were 98.1 males, and for every 100 females age 18 and over there were 96.1 males age 18 and over.

83.3% of residents lived in urban areas, while 16.7% lived in rural areas.

There were 61,335 households in the county, of which 26.1% had children under the age of 18 living in them. Of all households, 42.0% were married-couple households, 22.6% were households with a male householder and no spouse or partner present, and 27.8% were households with a female householder and no spouse or partner present. About 31.5% of all households were made up of individuals and 8.5% had someone living alone who was 65 years of age or older.

There were 65,916 housing units, of which 6.9% were vacant. Among occupied housing units, 57.0% were owner-occupied and 43.0% were renter-occupied. The homeowner vacancy rate was 2.1% and the rental vacancy rate was 7.7%.

=== 2010 census ===
As of the 2010 census, there were 130,882 people, 52,715 households, and _ families residing in the county. The population density was 213.51 inhabitants per square mile (82.4/km^{2}). There were 55,967 housing units at an average density of 91.30 per square mile (35.3/km^{2}). The racial makeup of the county was 85.64% White, 4.82% African American, 0.22% Native American, 5.21% Asian, 0.04% Pacific Islander, 1.81% from some other races and 2.27% from two or more races. Hispanic or Latino people of any race were 4.74% of the population.

=== 2000 census ===
As of the 2000 census, there were 111,006 people, 44,080 households, and 23,582 families residing in the county. The population density was 181.09 inhabitants per square mile (69.9/km^{2}). There were 45,831 housing units at an average density of 74.77 per square mile (28.9/km^{2}). The racial makeup of the county was 90.13% White, 2.90% African American, 0.28% Native American, 4.12% Asian, 0.04% Pacific Islander, 1.01% from some other races and 1.51% from two or more races. Hispanic or Latino people of any race were 2.51% of the population.

There were 44,080 households, out of which 26.50% had children under the age of 18 living with them, 43.90% were married couples living together, 6.80% had a female householder with no husband present, and 46.50% were non-families. 30.20% of all households were made up of individuals, and 5.60% had someone living alone who was 65 years of age or older. The average household size was 2.34 and the average family size was 2.97.

Age spread: 20.10% under the age of 18, 23.40% from 18 to 24, 30.80% from 25 to 44, 18.20% from 45 to 64, and 7.40% who were 65 years of age or older. The median age was 28 years. For every 100 females, there were 99.10 males. For every 100 females age 18 and over, there were 97.30 males.

The median income for a household in the county was $40,060, and the median income for a family was $60,112. Males had a median income of $36,279 versus $29,793 for females. The per capita income for the county was $22,220. About 5.20% of families and 15.00% of the population were below the poverty line, including 8.10% of those under age 18 and 3.80% of those age 65 or over.

== Politics ==
Largely due to the presence of the University of Iowa, Johnson County is considered the most liberal county in Iowa and a stronghold of the Democratic Party, and has always been among Iowa's most Democratic counties since the Civil War. It has been the strongest Democratic county in the state since 1984. This trend predates the recent swing toward the Democrats in counties influenced by college towns (this trend was less prevalent in Story County, home Iowa State University in Ames, until 1988). The last Republican to win the county in a presidential election was Richard Nixon in 1960, and the last Republican to even get 40 percent of the county's vote was Ronald Reagan in 1984. The last time the GOP won the county in a gubernatorial election was the 1978 Iowa gubernatorial election. As a measure of how strongly Democratic the county has been, Democrats easily carried it even in the national Republican landslides of 1972, 1984 and 1988, and the county was the only county in Iowa to vote for Democrat Alton B. Parker over Republican Theodore Roosevelt in 1904. In 2020, Joe Biden received the highest percentage of the vote received by any Democrat in the county's history; indeed, by any candidate of any party. In 2024, it was the only county to not vote for Donald Trump in the state's Republican presidential caucuses. Nikki Haley won the county by a single vote.

Johnson County's Democratic bent is just as pronounced at the state level. It was the lone county to vote Democratic in statewide Republican landslides, such as Senator Chuck Grassley's re-elections in 2010 and 2016 or Governor Terry Branstad's re-election in 2014.

United States presidential election results for Johnson County, Iowa
Year	Republican		Democratic		Third party(ies)	
Year	No.	%	No.	%	No.	%
1880	2,400	44.89%	2,766	51.74%	180	3.37%
1884	2,019	38.71%	3,151	60.41%	46	0.88%
1888	2,051	40.15%	3,038	59.48%	19	0.37%
1892	2,179	39.35%	3,227	58.28%	131	2.37%
1896	2,910	47.06%	3,170	51.26%	104	1.68%
1900	3,010	48.10%	3,182	50.85%	66	1.05%
1904	2,963	48.27%	3,085	50.25%	91	1.48%
1908	2,758	44.84%	3,314	53.88%	79	1.28%
1912	1,645	27.95%	3,327	56.52%	914	15.53%
1916	2,704	42.23%	3,650	57.00%	49	0.77%
1920	5,696	52.15%	5,032	46.07%	195	1.79%
1924	5,741	44.53%	4,570	35.45%	2,580	20.01%
1928	7,288	50.27%	7,181	49.53%	29	0.20%
1932	5,484	37.87%	8,764	60.51%	235	1.62%
1936	5,629	38.18%	8,794	59.65%	320	2.17%
1940	7,206	44.27%	9,017	55.39%	55	0.34%
1944	6,396	42.93%	8,434	56.62%	67	0.45%
1948	7,139	43.79%	8,611	52.82%	553	3.39%
1952	11,231	58.04%	8,067	41.69%	52	0.27%
1956	11,298	56.28%	8,767	43.67%	11	0.05%
1960	10,927	50.80%	10,563	49.11%	18	0.08%
1964	6,860	31.73%	14,717	68.08%	41	0.19%
1968	11,384	43.88%	13,541	52.19%	1,019	3.93%
1972	14,823	40.91%	20,922	57.74%	491	1.36%
1976	16,090	41.57%	20,208	52.20%	2,412	6.23%
1980	13,642	31.73%	20,122	46.80%	9,233	21.47%
1984	18,677	41.46%	26,000	57.72%	367	0.81%
1988	15,453	34.61%	28,759	64.41%	435	0.97%
1992	14,041	27.12%	28,656	55.35%	9,077	17.53%
1996	13,402	29.31%	27,888	60.98%	4,442	9.71%
2000	17,899	33.92%	31,174	59.08%	3,696	7.00%
2004	22,715	34.75%	41,847	64.01%	811	1.24%
2008	20,732	28.40%	51,027	69.91%	1,230	1.69%
2012	23,698	31.19%	50,666	66.69%	1,613	2.12%
2016	21,044	27.35%	50,200	65.25%	5,696	7.40%
2020	22,925	27.34%	59,177	70.57%	1,749	2.09%
2024	26,087	30.11%	58,846	67.92%	1,711	1.97%

== Communities ==
=== Cities ===
- Coralville
- Hills
- Iowa City
- Lone Tree
- North Liberty
- Oxford
- Shueyville
- Solon
- Swisher
- Tiffin
- University Heights
- West Branch (partially)

=== Census-designated place ===
- Frytown

=== Other unincorporated communities ===
- Amish
- Cosgrove
- Morse
- Newport
- Oakdale
- Oasis
- River Junction
- Sharon Center
- Sutliff
- Twin View Heights
- Western (partially)
- Windham

=== Ghost towns ===
- Elmira
- Midway

=== Townships ===
- Big Grove
- Cedar
- Clear Creek
- East Lucas
- Fremont
- Graham
- Hardin
- Jefferson
- Liberty
- Lincoln
- Madison
- Monroe
- Newport
- Oxford
- Penn
- Pleasant Valley
- Scott
- Sharon
- Union
- Washington
- West Lucas

=== Population ranking ===
The population ranking of the following table is based on the 2020 census of Johnson County.

† county seat

Rank	City/Town/etc.	Municipal type	Population (2020 Census)	Population (2024 Estimate)
1	† Iowa City	City	74,828	76,710
2	Coralville	City	22,318	23,959
3	North Liberty	City	20,479	21,904
4	Tiffin	City	4,512	6,695
5	Solon	City	3,018	3,584
6	West Branch (mostly in Cedar County)	City	2,509	2,976
7	Lone Tree	City	1,357	1,371
8	University Heights	City	1,228	1,248
9	Swisher	City	914	989
10	Hills	City	863	949
11	Shueyville	City	731	775
12	Oxford	City	722	725
13	Frytown	CDP	193	232

== Education ==
School districts include:

- Clear Creek Amana Community School District, Oxford
- College Community School District, Cedar Rapids
- Highland Community School District, Riverside
- Iowa City Community School District, Iowa City
- Lisbon Community School District, Lisbon
- Lone Tree Community School District, Lone Tree
- Mid-Prairie Community School District, Wellman
- Mount Vernon Community School District, Mount Vernon
- Solon Community School District, Solon
- West Branch Community School District, West Branch
- West Liberty Community School District, West Liberty
- Williamsburg Community School District, Williamsburg

== See also ==
- National Register of Historic Places listings in Johnson County, Iowa
- Secrest Octagon Barn
