= 2016 United States presidential election in Iowa =

- November 8, 2016
- Turnout: 72.77% ▼

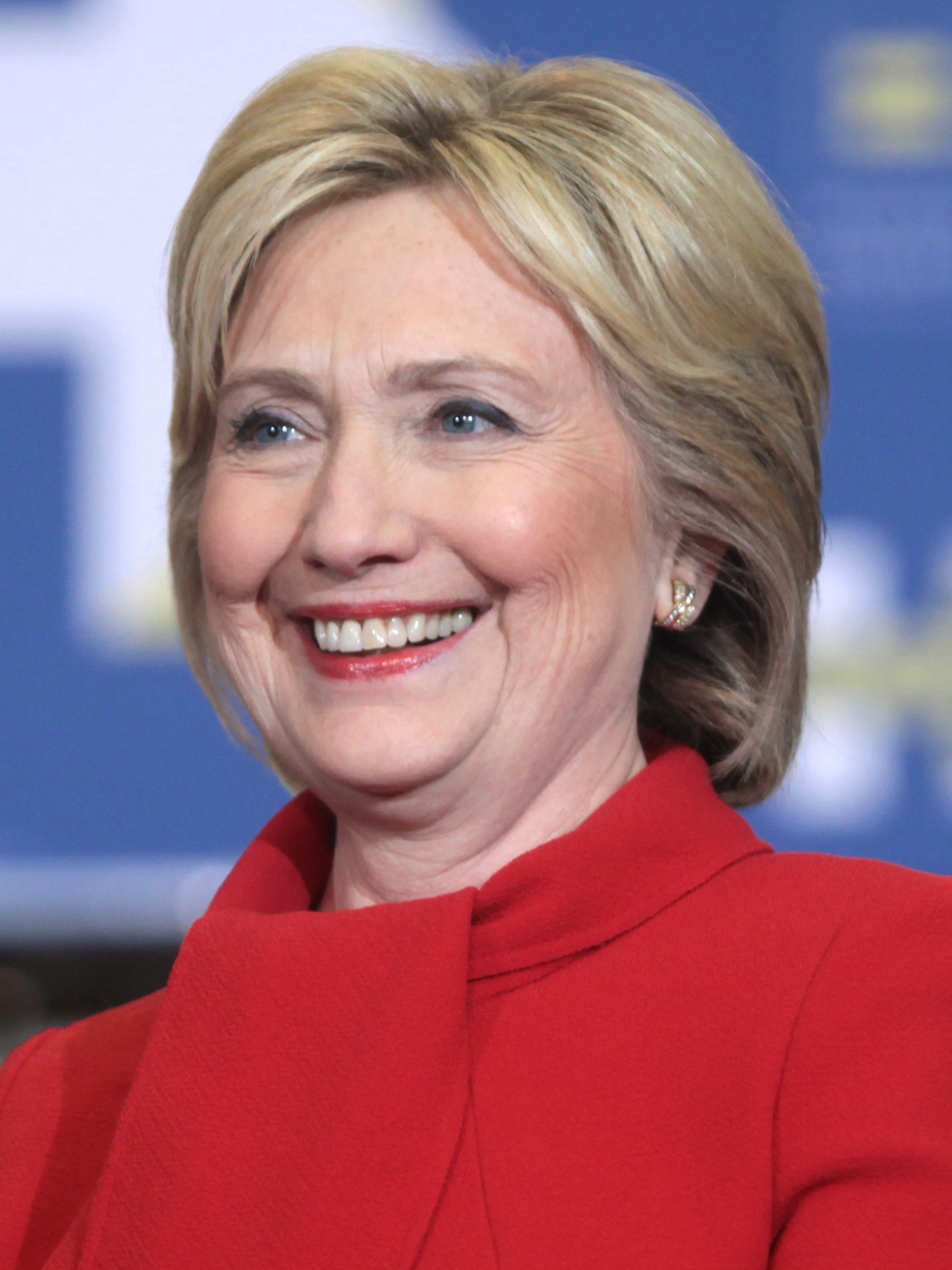
Nominee	Donald Trump	Hillary Clinton
Party	Republican	Democratic
Home state	New York	New York
Running mate	Mike Pence	Tim Kaine
Electoral vote	6	0
Popular vote	800,983	653,669
Percentage	51.15%	41.74%

Trump
40–50%
50–60%
60–70%
70–80%
80–90%
90–100%
Clinton
40–50%
50–60%
60–70%
70–80%
80–90%
Tie
President before election
Barack Obama
Democratic
Elected President
Donald Trump
Republican

Treemap of the popular vote by county

The 2016 United States presidential election in Iowa was held on Tuesday, November 8, 2016, as part of the 2016 United States presidential election in which all 50 states plus the District of Columbia participated. Iowa voters chose electors to represent them in the Electoral College via a popular vote, pitting the Republican Party's nominee, businessman Donald Trump, and his running mate Indiana Governor Mike Pence against the Democratic Party nominee, former Secretary of State Hillary Clinton, and her running mate Virginia Senator Tim Kaine. Iowa has six electoral votes in the Electoral College.

Trump won the state with 51.15% of the vote, while Clinton received 41.74% (a margin of 9.41%). Clinton's performance in Iowa was the worst performance for a Democratic presidential candidate since 1980. Trump, besides being the first Republican to carry the state since George W. Bush in 2004, won over a dozen counties that had not voted Republican since Ronald Reagan was on the ticket; won two counties that had last voted Republican in Richard Nixon's landslide victory in 1972; and also won Dubuque County, which had last voted Republican in 1956.

In 2016, Trump carried Iowa by the largest margin of any Republican candidate since Reagan in 1980, and he was the first Republican to win an outright majority of the state's vote since Reagan's historic 1984 landslide. Trump enjoyed the support of working-class whites in the agricultural industry, as well as the endorsement of Iowa's GOP establishment. Trump later carried the state by 13% in 2024, surpassing Reagan's margin in 1980.

== Caucuses ==
The incumbent President of the United States, Barack Obama, a Democrat and former U.S. senator from Illinois, was first elected to the presidency in 2008, running with U.S. Senator Joe Biden of Delaware. Defeating the Republican nominee, Senator John McCain of Arizona, with 52.9% of the popular vote and 68% of the electoral vote, Obama succeeded two-term Republican President George W. Bush, the former governor of Texas. Obama and Biden were reelected in the 2012 presidential election, defeating former Massachusetts Governor Mitt Romney with 51.1% of the popular vote and 61.7% of electoral votes. Although Obama's approval rating in the RealClearPolitics poll tracking average remained between 40 and 50 percent for most of his second term, it experienced a surge in early 2016 and reached its highest point since 2012 during June of that year. Analyst Nate Cohn noted that a strong approval rating for President Obama would equate to a strong performance for the Democratic candidate, and vice versa.

President Obama was not eligible to be re-elected after having served two terms. His running mate and two-term Vice President Biden decided not to enter the race for the Democratic presidential nomination either.

=== Democratic caucuses ===
==== Procedure ====
There is no ballot; instead, a unique form of debate and groupings chose delegates to county conventions supporting Hillary Clinton, Martin O'Malley, and Bernie Sanders. The Iowa Democratic Party does not release vote counts or the numbers of these delegates.

Results of the Democratic caucuses by county Hillary Clinton Bernie Sanders Tie

2016 Democratic Party's presidential nominating process in Iowa – Summary of results –
Candidate	State delegate equivalents		Estimated delegates		
Candidate	Count	Percentage	Pledged	Unpledged	Total
Hillary Clinton	700.47	49.84%	23	6	29
Bernie Sanders	696.92	49.59%	21	0	21
Martin O'Malley	7.63	0.54%	0	0	0
Uncommitted	0.46	0.03%	0	1	1
Total	1,405.48	100%	44	7	51

==== County conventions ====
In early March, the delegates chosen in the caucuses met chose delegates to the congressional district conventions.

=== Republican caucuses ===
Election results by county Ted Cruz Donald Trump Marco Rubio Tie between Cruz and Trump

Iowa Republican precinct caucuses, February 1, 2016
Candidate	Votes	Percentage	Actual delegate count		
Candidate	Votes	Percentage	Bound	Unbound	Total
Ted Cruz	51,666	27.64%	8	0	8
Donald Trump	45,427	24.3%	7	0	7
Marco Rubio	43,165	23.12%	7	0	7
Ben Carson	17,395	9.3%	3	0	3
Rand Paul	8,481	4.54%	1	0	1
Jeb Bush	5,238	2.8%	1	0	1
Carly Fiorina	3,485	1.86%	1	0	1
John Kasich	3,474	1.86%	1	0	1
Mike Huckabee	3,345	1.79%	1	0	1
Chris Christie	3,284	1.76%	0	0	0
Rick Santorum	1,783	0.95%	0	0	0
Other	117	0.06%	0	0	0
Jim Gilmore	12	0.01%	0	0	0
Unprojected delegates:			0	0	0
Total:	186,932	100.00%	30	0	30
Source: "Iowa". cnn.com.

== General election ==
=== Polling ===
Up until late August 2016, the election was close, with both Donald Trump and Hillary Clinton winning polls but neither taking a serious lead. In September 2016, Trump gained momentum, by winning a poll 44% to 39% in early September and then winning 3 more polls in a row by margins larger than 5%. From late September 2016 until election day, Trump won every poll but one. The final poll average showed Trump ahead 44% to 41%, with many undecided voters who mostly swung to Trump on election night. The latest poll also showed Trump ahead by 46% to 39%.

=== Predictions ===
Source	Ranking	As of
CNN	Lean R (flip)	November 4, 2016
Cook Political Report	Lean R (flip)	November 7, 2016
Electoral-vote.com	Likely R (flip)	November 8, 2016
NBC	Lean R (flip)	November 7, 2016
RealClearPolitics	Tossup	November 7, 2016
Rothenberg Political Report	Tilt R (flip)	November 7, 2016
Sabato's Crystal Ball	Lean R (flip)	November 7, 2016

=== Results ===
Chart of popular vote
1. Trump (51.1%)
2. Clinton (41.7%)
3. Johnson (3.78%)
4. Write-ins (1.13%)
5. McMullin (0.79%)
6. Stein (0.73%)
7. Others (0.67%)

2016 United States presidential election in Iowa
Party	Candidate	Running mate	Votes	Percentage	Electoral votes
Republican	Donald Trump	Mike Pence	800,983	51.15%	6
Democratic	Hillary Clinton	Tim Kaine	653,669	41.74%	0
Libertarian	Gary Johnson	Bill Weld	59,186	3.78%	0
Write-in	Various	Various	17,746	1.13%	0
Independent	Evan McMullin	Nathan Johnson	12,366	0.79%	0
Green	Jill Stein	Ajamu Baraka	11,479	0.73%	0
Constitution	Darrell L. Castle	Scott N. Bradley	5,335	0.34%	0
New Independent	Lynn Kahn	Jay Stolba	2,247	0.14%	0
Legal Marijuana Now	Dan Vacek	Mark Elworth	2,246	0.14%	0
Independent	Rocky De La Fuente	Michael Steinberg	451	0.03%	0
Socialism and Liberation	Gloria La Riva	Dennis J. Banks	323	0.02%	0
Totals			1,566,031	100.00%	6
Voter turnout (voting age population)					72.0%
Source: Iowa Secretary of State

==== By county ====
County	Donald Trump Republican		Hillary Clinton Democratic		Various candidates Other parties		Margin		Total
County	#	%	#	%	#	%	#	%	Total
Adair	2,461	64.58%	1,133	29.73%	217	5.69%	1,328	34.85%	3,811
Adams	1,395	66.24%	565	26.83%	146	6.93%	830	39.41%	2,106
Allamakee	4,093	59.12%	2,421	34.97%	409	5.91%	1,672	24.15%	6,923
Appanoose	4,033	65.73%	1,814	29.56%	289	4.71%	2,219	36.17%	6,136
Audubon	2,136	62.60%	1,080	31.65%	196	5.75%	1,056	30.95%	3,412
Benton	8,232	59.46%	4,678	33.79%	934	6.75%	3,554	25.67%	13,844
Black Hawk	27,476	42.66%	32,233	50.05%	4,696	7.29%	-4,757	-7.39%	64,405
Boone	7,484	52.72%	5,541	39.03%	1,171	8.25%	1,943	13.69%	14,196
Bremer	7,208	53.24%	5,356	39.56%	974	7.20%	1,852	13.68%	13,538
Buchanan	5,510	53.75%	3,970	38.72%	772	7.53%	1,540	15.03%	10,252
Buena Vista	4,903	59.23%	2,856	34.50%	519	6.27%	2,047	24.73%	8,278
Butler	4,921	65.50%	2,157	28.71%	435	5.79%	2,764	36.79%	7,513
Calhoun	3,468	67.22%	1,398	27.10%	293	5.68%	2,070	40.12%	5,159
Carroll	6,638	62.96%	3,309	31.38%	597	5.66%	3,329	31.58%	10,544
Cass	4,761	66.82%	1,951	27.38%	413	5.80%	2,810	39.44%	7,125
Cedar	5,295	55.50%	3,599	37.72%	647	6.78%	1,696	17.78%	9,541
Cerro Gordo	11,621	50.60%	9,862	42.94%	1,482	6.46%	1,759	7.66%	22,965
Cherokee	4,192	66.99%	1,679	26.83%	387	6.18%	2,513	40.16%	6,258
Chickasaw	3,742	58.15%	2,266	35.21%	427	6.64%	1,476	22.94%	6,435
Clarke	2,713	60.91%	1,465	32.89%	276	6.20%	1,248	28.02%	4,454
Clay	5,877	68.20%	2,249	26.10%	491	5.70%	3,628	42.10%	8,617
Clayton	5,317	58.24%	3,237	35.46%	575	6.30%	2,080	22.78%	9,129
Clinton	11,276	48.88%	10,095	43.76%	1,696	7.36%	1,181	5.12%	23,067
Crawford	4,617	66.58%	1,991	28.71%	327	4.71%	2,626	37.87%	6,935
Dallas	19,339	50.56%	15,701	41.05%	3,212	8.39%	3,638	9.51%	38,252
Davis	2,723	70.14%	977	25.17%	182	4.69%	1,746	44.97%	3,882
Decatur	2,296	61.49%	1,201	32.16%	237	6.35%	1,095	29.33%	3,734
Delaware	5,694	61.62%	2,957	32.00%	590	6.38%	2,737	29.62%	9,241
Des Moines	9,529	49.88%	8,212	42.99%	1,362	7.13%	1,317	6.89%	19,103
Dickinson	6,753	65.22%	3,056	29.52%	545	5.26%	3,697	35.70%	10,354
Dubuque	23,460	47.18%	22,850	45.96%	3,411	6.86%	610	1.22%	49,721
Emmet	3,124	65.73%	1,357	28.55%	272	5.72%	1,767	37.18%	4,753
Fayette	5,620	56.34%	3,689	36.98%	666	6.68%	1,931	19.36%	9,975
Floyd	4,375	54.28%	3,179	39.44%	506	6.28%	1,196	14.84%	8,060
Franklin	3,163	63.67%	1,493	30.05%	312	6.28%	1,670	33.62%	4,968
Fremont	2,407	66.95%	963	26.79%	225	6.26%	1,444	40.16%	3,595
Greene	2,820	58.49%	1,691	35.08%	310	6.43%	1,129	23.41%	4,821
Grundy	4,527	65.88%	1,856	27.01%	489	7.11%	2,671	38.87%	6,872
Guthrie	3,628	63.10%	1,732	30.12%	390	6.78%	1,896	32.98%	5,750
Hamilton	4,463	58.01%	2,726	35.43%	505	6.56%	1,737	22.58%	7,694
Hancock	3,977	67.74%	1,587	27.03%	307	5.23%	2,390	40.71%	5,871
Hardin	5,254	61.57%	2,787	32.66%	492	5.77%	2,467	28.91%	8,533
Harrison	4,902	65.67%	2,131	28.55%	432	5.78%	2,771	37.12%	7,465
Henry	5,779	61.45%	2,904	30.88%	721	7.67%	2,875	30.57%	9,404
Howard	2,611	57.27%	1,677	36.78%	271	5.95%	934	20.49%	4,559
Humboldt	3,568	70.14%	1,252	24.61%	267	5.25%	2,316	45.53%	5,087
Ida	2,655	73.50%	792	21.93%	165	4.57%	1,863	51.57%	3,612
Iowa	5,205	58.46%	3,084	34.64%	615	6.90%	2,121	23.82%	8,904
Jackson	5,824	56.49%	3,837	37.22%	649	6.29%	1,987	19.27%	10,310
Jasper	10,560	55.48%	7,109	37.35%	1,365	7.17%	3,451	18.13%	19,034
Jefferson	3,748	45.95%	3,710	45.49%	698	8.56%	38	0.46%	8,156
Johnson	21,044	27.35%	50,200	65.25%	5,696	7.40%	-29,156	-37.90%	76,940
Jones	5,720	56.45%	3,787	37.37%	626	6.18%	1,933	19.08%	10,133
Keokuk	3,390	68.00%	1,342	26.92%	253	5.08%	2,048	41.08%	4,985
Kossuth	5,653	65.68%	2,543	29.55%	411	4.77%	3,110	36.13%	8,607
Lee	8,803	54.50%	6,215	38.48%	1,133	7.02%	2,588	16.02%	16,151
Linn	48,390	41.32%	58,935	50.33%	9,773	8.35%	-10,545	-9.01%	117,098
Louisa	3,069	61.28%	1,648	32.91%	291	5.81%	1,421	28.37%	5,008
Lucas	2,877	66.08%	1,239	28.46%	238	5.46%	1,638	37.62%	4,354
Lyon	5,192	81.42%	920	14.43%	265	4.15%	4,272	66.99%	6,377
Madison	5,360	62.07%	2,678	31.01%	598	6.92%	2,682	31.06%	8,636
Mahaska	7,432	69.90%	2,619	24.63%	581	5.47%	4,813	45.27%	10,632
Marion	10,962	61.53%	5,482	30.77%	1,372	7.70%	5,480	30.76%	17,816
Marshall	9,146	50.87%	7,652	42.56%	1,182	6.57%	1,494	8.31%	17,980
Mills	5,067	65.82%	2,090	27.15%	541	7.03%	2,977	38.67%	7,698
Mitchell	3,190	58.89%	1,888	34.85%	339	6.26%	1,302	24.04%	5,417
Monona	3,120	68.24%	1,247	27.27%	205	4.49%	1,873	40.97%	4,572
Monroe	2,638	68.25%	1,056	27.32%	171	4.43%	1,582	40.93%	3,865
Montgomery	3,436	68.12%	1,314	26.05%	294	5.83%	2,122	42.07%	5,044
Muscatine	9,584	49.32%	8,368	43.06%	1,482	7.62%	1,216	6.26%	19,434
O'Brien	5,752	77.67%	1,315	17.76%	339	4.57%	4,437	59.91%	7,406
Osceola	2,531	78.77%	552	17.18%	130	4.05%	1,979	61.59%	3,213
Page	4,893	69.46%	1,807	25.65%	344	4.89%	3,086	43.81%	7,044
Palo Alto	3,081	65.51%	1,398	29.73%	224	4.76%	1,683	35.78%	4,703
Plymouth	9,680	73.39%	2,885	21.87%	625	4.74%	6,795	51.52%	13,190
Pocahontas	2,702	69.91%	963	24.92%	200	5.17%	1,739	44.99%	3,865
Polk	93,492	40.38%	119,804	51.74%	18,259	7.88%	-26,312	-11.36%	231,555
Pottawattamie	24,447	57.28%	15,355	35.98%	2,878	6.74%	9,092	21.30%	42,680
Poweshiek	4,946	50.30%	4,304	43.77%	583	5.93%	642	6.53%	9,833
Ringgold	1,824	67.38%	753	27.82%	130	4.80%	1,071	39.56%	2,707
Sac	3,703	71.05%	1,270	24.37%	239	4.58%	2,433	46.68%	5,212
Scott	39,149	45.41%	40,440	46.90%	6,631	7.69%	-1,291	-1.49%	86,220
Shelby	4,362	68.48%	1,662	26.09%	346	5.43%	2,700	42.39%	6,370
Sioux	14,785	81.26%	2,300	12.64%	1,109	6.10%	12,485	68.62%	18,194
Story	19,458	38.40%	25,709	50.74%	5,500	10.86%	-6,251	-12.34%	50,667
Tama	4,971	56.80%	3,196	36.52%	585	6.68%	1,775	20.28%	8,752
Taylor	2,111	69.69%	758	25.02%	160	5.29%	1,353	44.67%	3,029
Union	3,525	60.44%	1,922	32.96%	385	6.60%	1,603	27.48%	5,832
Van Buren	2,527	70.96%	845	23.73%	189	5.31%	1,682	47.23%	3,561
Wapello	8,715	57.53%	5,594	36.93%	840	5.54%	3,121	20.60%	15,149
Warren	14,814	54.26%	10,411	38.14%	2,075	7.60%	4,403	16.12%	27,300
Washington	6,173	56.48%	3,943	36.08%	813	7.44%	2,230	20.40%	10,929
Wayne	2,069	70.37%	719	24.46%	152	5.17%	1,350	45.91%	2,940
Webster	10,056	57.69%	6,305	36.17%	1,069	6.14%	3,751	21.52%	17,430
Winnebago	3,447	59.56%	1,931	33.37%	409	7.07%	1,516	26.19%	5,787
Winneshiek	5,344	47.03%	5,254	46.24%	764	6.73%	90	0.79%	11,362
Woodbury	24,727	56.56%	16,210	37.08%	2,781	6.36%	8,517	19.48%	43,718
Worth	2,453	57.62%	1,530	35.94%	274	6.44%	923	21.68%	4,257
Wright	3,800	63.06%	1,896	31.46%	330	5.48%	1,904	31.60%	6,026
Totals	800,983	51.15%	653,669	41.74%	111,379	7.11%	147,314	9.41%	1,566,031

Counties that flipped from Democratic to Republican

- Allamakee (largest city: Waukon)
- Boone (largest city: Boone)
- Bremer (largest city: Waverly)
- Buchanan (largest city: Independence)
- Cedar (largest city: Tipton)
- Cerro Gordo (largest city: Mason City)
- Chickasaw (largest city: New Hampton)
- Clarke (largest city: Osceola)
- Clayton (largest city: Guttenberg)
- Clinton (largest city: Clinton)
- Des Moines (largest city: Burlington)
- Dubuque (largest city: Dubuque)
- Fayette (largest city: Oelwein)
- Floyd (largest city: Charles City)
- Howard (largest city: Cresco)
- Jackson (largest city: Maquoketa)
- Jasper (largest city: Newton)
- Jefferson (largest city: Fairfield)
- Jones (largest city: Anamosa)
- Lee (largest city: Fort Madison)
- Louisa (largest city: Wapello)
- Marshall (largest city: Marshalltown)
- Mitchell (largest city: Osage)
- Muscatine (largest city: Muscatine)
- Poweshiek (largest city: Grinnell)
- Tama (largest city: Tama)
- Union (largest city: Creston)
- Wapello (largest city: Ottumwa)
- Webster (largest city: Fort Dodge)
- Winneshiek (largest city: Decorah)
- Woodbury (largest city: Sioux City)
- Worth (largest city: Northwood)

==== By congressional district ====
Trump won all four of the congressional districts, including one held by a Democrat.

District	Clinton	Trump	Representative
1st	45%	48%	Rod Blum
2nd	44%	48%	Dave Loebsack
3rd	44%	48%	David Young
4th	33%	60%	Steve King

== Analysis ==
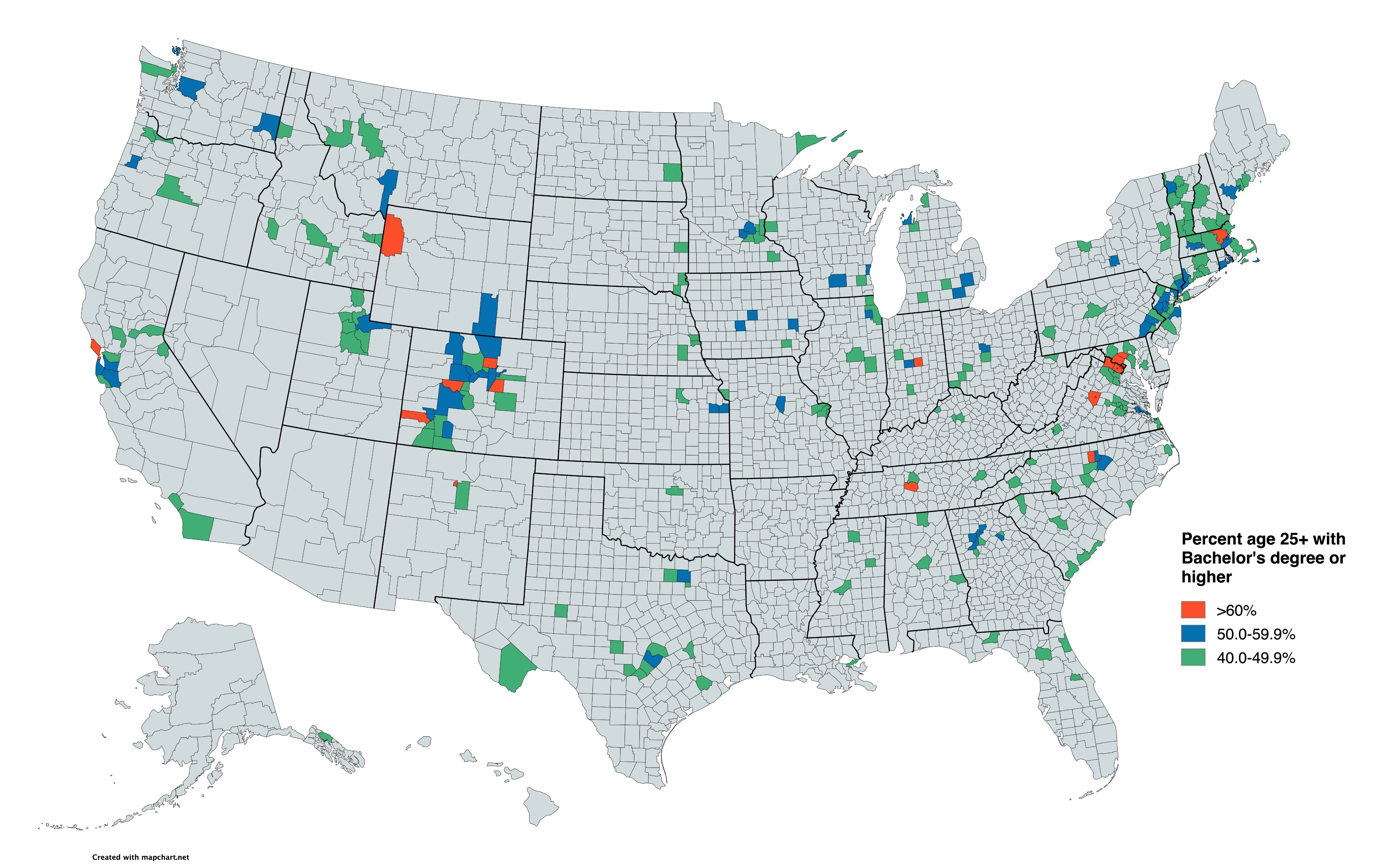
A map of the most college-educated counties in the United States

Trump made massive gains in nearly all of the state’s counties, except for the most college-educated ones, particularly Johnson County (home to the University of Iowa).

The difference of 9.4% points was the largest winning margin for Trump in a state that had voted for Barack Obama in 2012. This was also the first time since 1976 that Iowa voted to the right of Texas, which Trump won in this election by 8.99 points. Trump carried 93 out of 99 counties, the most for a Republican presidential nominee in the state since 1980, and he flipped 32 counties won by Obama in 2012, the most out of any state. This was the first time since 1988 in which Iowa did not go for the winner of the popular vote. It was also the first time since 2004 (and only the second since 1984) that Iowa would vote for a Republican candidate. This is also the first election since 1980 in which a non-incumbent Republican won the state.

== See also ==
- United States presidential elections in Iowa
- 2016 Democratic Party presidential debates and forums
- 2016 Democratic Party presidential primaries
- 2016 Republican Party presidential debates and forums
- 2016 Republican Party presidential primaries
- United States presidential election
