= Oregon Township =

Oregon Township may refer to:

== Indiana ==
- Oregon Township, Clark County, Indiana
- Oregon Township, Starke County, Indiana

== Iowa ==
- Oregon Township, Washington County, Iowa
- New Oregon Township, Howard County, Iowa

== Michigan ==
- Oregon Township, Michigan

== Ohio ==
- Oregon Township, Lucas County, Ohio

== Pennsylvania ==
- Oregon Township, Pennsylvania
