= Jamestown Township =

Jamestown Township may refer to:

- Jamestown Township, Steuben County, Indiana
- Jamestown Township, Howard County, Iowa
- Jamestown Charter Township, Michigan
- Jamestown Township, Blue Earth County, Minnesota
- Jamestown Township, Guilford County, North Carolina, in Guilford County, North Carolina
