= 1968 United States presidential election in Iowa =

- November 5, 1968

Nominee	Richard Nixon	Hubert Humphrey	George Wallace
Party	Republican	Democratic	American Independent
Home state	New York (Note: Although he was born in California and he served as a U.S. senator from California, in 1968 Richard Nixon’s official state of residence was New York, because he moved there to practice law after his defeat in the 1962 California gubernatorial election. During his first term as president, Nixon re-established his residency in California. Consequently, most reliable reference books list Nixon's home state as New York in the 1968 election and his home state as California in the 1972 (and 1960) election.)	Minnesota	Alabama
Running mate	Spiro Agnew	Edmund Muskie	S. Marvin Griffin
Electoral vote	9	0	0
Popular vote	619,106	476,699	66,422
Percentage	53.01%	40.82%	5.69%
County results
Nixon
40–50%
50–60%
60–70%
70–80%
80–90%
Humphrey
40–50%
50–60%
President before election
Lyndon B. Johnson
Democratic
Elected President
Richard Nixon
Republican

The 1968 United States presidential election in Iowa took place on November 5, 1968, as part of the 1968 United States presidential election. Iowa voters chose nine representatives, or electors, to the Electoral College, who voted for president and vice president.

Iowa was won by the Republican candidate, former Vice President Richard Nixon, with 53.01 percent of the popular vote, against the Democratic candidate, former Senator and incumbent Vice President Hubert Humphrey, with 40.82 percent. American Independent Party candidate George Wallace performed decently, finishing with 5.69 percent of the popular vote.

Nixon's victory was the first of five consecutive Republican victories in the state, as Iowa would not vote for a Democratic candidate again until Michael Dukakis in 1988, after which it leaned Democratic until 2016, although George W. Bush narrowly won the state over John Kerry in 2004.

== Results ==
1968 United States presidential election in Iowa
Party	Candidate	Votes	%
Republican	Richard Nixon	619,106	53.01%
Democratic	Hubert Humphrey	476,699	40.82%
American Independent	George Wallace	66,422	5.69%
Nominated By Petition	Fred Halstead	3,377	0.29%
Iowa Peace and Freedom	Eldridge Cleaver	1,332	0.11%
Iowa Prohibition	Harold Munn	362	0.03%
Write-ins	—	250	0.02%
Socialist Labor	Henning Blomen	241	0.02%
Universal	Kirby Hensley	142	0.01%
Total votes		1,167,931	100%

=== Results by county ===
County	Richard Nixon Republican		Hubert Humphrey Democratic		George Wallace American Independent		Fred Halstead Nominated By Petition		Various candidates Other parties		Margin		Total votes cast
County	#	%	#	%	#	%	#	%	#	%	#	%	Total votes cast
Adair	2,789	60.82%	1,559	33.99%	234	5.10%	1	0.02%	3	0.07%	1,230	26.83%	4,586
Adams	1,868	59.72%	993	31.75%	260	8.31%	6	0.19%	1	0.03%	875	27.97%	3,128
Allamakee	4,449	62.57%	2,245	31.58%	407	5.72%	6	0.08%	3	0.04%	2,204	30.99%	7,110
Appanoose	3,497	49.58%	3,005	42.61%	540	7.66%	4	0.06%	7	0.10%	492	6.97%	7,053
Audubon	2,592	57.55%	1,710	37.97%	198	4.40%	3	0.07%	1	0.02%	882	19.58%	4,504
Benton	5,016	52.06%	3,944	40.93%	602	6.25%	48	0.50%	25	0.26%	1,072	11.13%	9,635
Black Hawk	25,594	51.65%	21,097	42.57%	2,621	5.29%	121	0.24%	121	0.24%	4,497	9.08%	49,554
Boone	5,260	47.40%	5,219	47.03%	562	5.06%	35	0.32%	20	0.18%	41	0.37%	11,096
Bremer	5,604	65.75%	2,481	29.11%	423	4.96%	2	0.02%	13	0.15%	3,123	36.64%	8,523
Buchanan	4,541	52.35%	3,670	42.31%	454	5.23%	3	0.03%	6	0.07%	871	10.04%	8,674
Buena Vista	5,599	61.87%	3,051	33.71%	386	4.27%	4	0.04%	10	0.11%	2,548	28.16%	9,050
Butler	4,651	70.59%	1,673	25.39%	252	3.82%	5	0.08%	8	0.12%	2,978	45.20%	6,589
Calhoun	3,715	57.53%	2,361	36.56%	335	5.19%	32	0.50%	15	0.23%	1,354	20.97%	6,458
Carroll	3,927	42.68%	4,809	52.26%	412	4.48%	41	0.45%	13	0.14%	-882	-9.58%	9,202
Cass	5,223	67.30%	2,136	27.52%	369	4.75%	14	0.18%	19	0.24%	3,087	39.78%	7,761
Cedar	4,494	59.02%	2,675	35.13%	438	5.75%	1	0.01%	6	0.08%	1,819	23.89%	7,614
Cerro Gordo	10,661	52.49%	8,554	42.12%	1,036	5.10%	22	0.11%	37	0.18%	2,107	10.37%	20,310
Cherokee	4,436	59.18%	2,705	36.09%	340	4.54%	3	0.04%	12	0.16%	1,731	23.09%	7,496
Chickasaw	3,510	51.89%	2,966	43.85%	286	4.23%	1	0.01%	1	0.01%	544	8.04%	6,764
Clarke	2,059	51.48%	1,655	41.38%	286	7.15%	0	0.00%	0	0.00%	404	10.10%	4,000
Clay	4,325	56.70%	2,840	37.23%	369	4.84%	83	1.09%	11	0.14%	1,485	19.47%	7,628
Clayton	5,132	57.81%	3,168	35.68%	541	6.09%	19	0.21%	18	0.20%	1,964	22.13%	8,878
Clinton	11,513	51.92%	9,515	42.91%	1,059	4.78%	45	0.20%	43	0.19%	1,998	9.01%	22,175
Crawford	4,287	55.36%	2,851	36.82%	539	6.96%	43	0.56%	24	0.31%	1,436	18.54%	7,744
Dallas	5,549	49.16%	5,062	44.85%	640	5.67%	21	0.19%	15	0.13%	487	4.31%	11,287
Davis	2,016	47.12%	1,904	44.51%	355	8.30%	3	0.07%	0	0.00%	112	2.61%	4,278
Decatur	2,261	49.28%	2,057	44.83%	262	5.71%	5	0.11%	3	0.07%	204	4.45%	4,588
Delaware	4,650	59.39%	2,760	35.25%	412	5.26%	3	0.04%	4	0.05%	1,890	24.14%	7,829
Des Moines	8,452	42.30%	10,164	50.87%	1,318	6.60%	7	0.04%	38	0.19%	-1,712	-8.57%	19,979
Dickinson	3,472	56.45%	2,286	37.16%	281	4.57%	99	1.61%	13	0.21%	1,186	19.29%	6,151
Dubuque	14,197	40.72%	18,664	53.54%	1,701	4.88%	188	0.54%	113	0.32%	-4,467	-12.82%	34,863
Emmet	3,444	58.90%	2,163	36.99%	230	3.93%	8	0.14%	2	0.03%	1,281	21.91%	5,847
Fayette	6,935	59.34%	4,098	35.06%	636	5.44%	8	0.07%	10	0.09%	2,837	24.28%	11,687
Floyd	4,792	58.60%	2,971	36.33%	390	4.77%	11	0.13%	14	0.17%	1,821	22.27%	8,178
Franklin	3,604	63.48%	1,777	31.30%	240	4.23%	45	0.79%	11	0.19%	1,827	32.18%	5,677
Fremont	2,385	55.85%	1,484	34.75%	396	9.27%	3	0.07%	2	0.05%	901	21.10%	4,270
Greene	3,208	55.93%	2,208	38.49%	269	4.69%	34	0.59%	17	0.30%	1,000	17.44%	5,736
Grundy	4,866	71.14%	1,675	24.49%	290	4.24%	5	0.07%	4	0.06%	3,191	46.65%	6,840
Guthrie	3,346	58.18%	2,063	35.87%	335	5.83%	4	0.07%	3	0.05%	1,283	22.31%	5,751
Hamilton	4,607	57.58%	3,058	38.22%	301	3.76%	7	0.09%	28	0.35%	1,549	19.36%	8,001
Hancock	3,544	59.57%	2,131	35.82%	249	4.19%	14	0.24%	11	0.18%	1,413	23.75%	5,949
Hardin	5,308	58.11%	3,227	35.33%	407	4.46%	167	1.83%	25	0.27%	2,081	22.78%	9,134
Harrison	3,867	56.66%	2,410	35.31%	540	7.91%	4	0.06%	4	0.06%	1,457	21.35%	6,825
Henry	4,613	60.23%	2,532	33.06%	503	6.57%	3	0.04%	8	0.10%	2,081	27.17%	7,659
Howard	3,141	53.90%	2,420	41.53%	253	4.34%	2	0.03%	11	0.19%	721	12.37%	5,827
Humboldt	3,239	59.87%	1,940	35.86%	217	4.01%	8	0.15%	6	0.11%	1,299	24.01%	5,410
Ida	2,753	62.21%	1,463	33.06%	208	4.70%	1	0.02%	0	0.00%	1,290	29.15%	4,425
Iowa	4,133	58.12%	2,586	36.37%	367	5.16%	17	0.24%	8	0.11%	1,547	21.75%	7,111
Jackson	4,535	53.02%	3,413	39.90%	489	5.72%	87	1.02%	29	0.34%	1,122	13.12%	8,553
Jasper	7,901	51.79%	6,556	42.98%	742	4.86%	23	0.15%	33	0.22%	1,345	8.81%	15,255
Jefferson	4,130	59.52%	2,411	34.75%	377	5.43%	7	0.10%	14	0.20%	1,719	24.77%	6,939
Johnson	11,384	43.88%	13,541	52.19%	736	2.84%	63	0.24%	220	0.85%	-2,157	-8.31%	25,944
Jones	4,513	53.65%	3,415	40.60%	475	5.65%	3	0.04%	6	0.07%	1,098	13.05%	8,412
Keokuk	3,588	53.26%	2,807	41.67%	332	4.93%	5	0.07%	5	0.07%	781	11.59%	6,737
Kossuth	5,350	53.03%	4,392	43.53%	310	3.07%	23	0.23%	14	0.14%	958	9.50%	10,089
Lee	8,883	49.25%	8,076	44.78%	1,052	5.83%	6	0.03%	19	0.11%	807	4.47%	18,036
Linn	30,918	47.99%	29,898	46.40%	3,182	4.94%	232	0.36%	200	0.31%	1,020	1.59%	64,430
Louisa	2,529	56.40%	1,632	36.40%	323	7.20%	0	0.00%	0	0.00%	897	20.00%	4,484
Lucas	2,543	53.18%	1,942	40.61%	290	6.06%	5	0.10%	2	0.04%	601	12.57%	4,782
Lyon	4,195	72.91%	1,403	24.38%	151	2.62%	2	0.03%	3	0.05%	2,792	48.53%	5,754
Madison	3,151	55.49%	2,192	38.60%	327	5.76%	2	0.04%	7	0.12%	959	16.89%	5,679
Mahaska	5,670	56.87%	3,721	37.32%	420	4.21%	142	1.42%	17	0.17%	1,949	19.55%	9,970
Marion	5,791	52.35%	4,618	41.75%	597	5.40%	32	0.29%	24	0.22%	1,173	10.60%	11,062
Marshall	9,402	56.35%	6,362	38.13%	819	4.91%	56	0.34%	47	0.28%	3,040	18.22%	16,686
Mills	2,916	62.41%	1,216	26.03%	532	11.39%	1	0.02%	7	0.15%	1,700	36.38%	4,672
Mitchell	3,533	60.60%	2,103	36.07%	192	3.29%	1	0.02%	1	0.02%	1,430	24.53%	5,830
Monona	2,980	53.12%	2,184	38.93%	437	7.79%	4	0.07%	5	0.09%	796	14.19%	5,610
Monroe	2,143	45.55%	2,240	47.61%	312	6.63%	6	0.13%	4	0.09%	-97	-2.06%	4,705
Montgomery	4,155	64.11%	1,892	29.19%	425	6.56%	7	0.11%	2	0.03%	2,263	34.92%	6,481
Muscatine	7,361	57.18%	4,726	36.71%	643	4.99%	115	0.89%	29	0.23%	2,635	20.47%	12,874
O'Brien	5,594	69.34%	2,146	26.60%	322	3.99%	1	0.01%	5	0.06%	3,448	42.74%	8,068
Osceola	2,516	61.34%	1,420	34.62%	164	4.00%	2	0.05%	0	0.00%	1,096	26.72%	4,102
Page	5,907	68.06%	2,128	24.52%	634	7.30%	1	0.01%	9	0.10%	3,779	43.54%	8,679
Palo Alto	3,114	50.04%	2,874	46.18%	234	3.76%	1	0.02%	0	0.00%	240	3.86%	6,223
Plymouth	6,236	62.13%	3,234	32.22%	557	5.55%	6	0.06%	4	0.04%	3,002	29.91%	10,037
Pocahontas	2,940	52.56%	2,364	42.26%	254	4.54%	22	0.39%	14	0.25%	576	10.30%	5,594
Polk	51,814	45.14%	52,731	45.94%	9,524	8.30%	403	0.35%	312	0.27%	-917	-0.80%	114,784
Pottawattamie	16,038	56.47%	9,495	33.43%	2,758	9.71%	59	0.21%	49	0.17%	6,543	23.04%	28,399
Poweshiek	4,470	55.10%	3,250	40.06%	367	4.52%	8	0.10%	17	0.21%	1,220	15.04%	8,112
Ringgold	1,986	57.05%	1,237	35.54%	256	7.35%	1	0.03%	1	0.03%	749	21.51%	3,481
Sac	4,182	62.64%	2,207	33.06%	280	4.19%	7	0.10%	0	0.00%	1,975	29.58%	6,676
Scott	25,783	46.86%	24,596	44.71%	4,133	7.51%	377	0.69%	129	0.23%	1,187	2.15%	55,018
Shelby	3,886	58.65%	2,365	35.69%	330	4.98%	26	0.39%	19	0.29%	1,521	22.96%	6,626
Sioux	10,010	80.04%	2,181	17.44%	315	2.52%	1	0.01%	0	0.00%	7,829	62.60%	12,507
Story	13,327	56.29%	9,456	39.94%	772	3.26%	60	0.25%	60	0.25%	3,871	16.35%	23,675
Tama	4,955	53.55%	3,767	40.71%	494	5.34%	28	0.30%	9	0.10%	1,188	12.84%	9,253
Taylor	2,765	59.64%	1,501	32.38%	368	7.94%	1	0.02%	1	0.02%	1,264	27.26%	4,636
Union	3,365	57.05%	2,137	36.23%	374	6.34%	13	0.22%	9	0.15%	1,228	20.82%	5,898
Van Buren	2,294	59.29%	1,331	34.40%	237	6.13%	1	0.03%	6	0.16%	963	24.89%	3,869
Wapello	7,825	41.96%	9,375	50.28%	1,355	7.27%	65	0.35%	27	0.14%	-1,550	-8.32%	18,647
Warren	5,619	50.30%	4,613	41.29%	919	8.23%	3	0.03%	17	0.15%	1,006	9.01%	11,171
Washington	4,899	61.68%	2,679	33.73%	349	4.39%	1	0.01%	15	0.19%	2,220	27.95%	7,943
Wayne	2,553	55.83%	1,723	37.68%	283	6.19%	11	0.24%	3	0.07%	830	18.15%	4,573
Webster	9,349	48.96%	8,572	44.89%	1,026	5.37%	90	0.47%	60	0.31%	777	4.07%	19,097
Winnebago	3,543	59.51%	2,163	36.33%	246	4.13%	1	0.02%	1	0.02%	1,380	23.18%	5,954
Winneshiek	5,600	60.09%	3,364	36.10%	344	3.69%	3	0.03%	8	0.09%	2,236	23.99%	9,319
Woodbury	21,159	50.62%	18,281	43.73%	2,153	5.15%	140	0.33%	70	0.17%	2,878	6.89%	41,803
Worth	2,383	53.91%	1,815	41.06%	214	4.84%	5	0.11%	3	0.07%	568	12.85%	4,420
Wright	4,299	56.95%	2,969	39.33%	248	3.29%	16	0.21%	17	0.23%	1,330	17.62%	7,549
Totals	619,106	53.01%	476,699	40.82%	66,422	5.69%	3,377	0.29%	2,327	0.20%	142,407	12.19%	1,167,931

==== Counties that flipped from Democratic to Republican ====
- Adair
- Adams
- Appanoose
- Audubon
- Benton
- Black Hawk
- Boone
- Bremer
- Buchanan
- Buena Vista
- Calhoun
- Cerro Gordo
- Cedar
- Cherokee
- Chickasaw
- Clarke
- Clay
- Clayton
- Clinton
- Crawford
- Decatur
- Dallas
- Decatur
- Delaware
- Dickinson
- Emmet
- Fayette
- Floyd
- Franklin
- Fremont
- Greene
- Guthrie
- Hamilton
- Hancock
- Hardin
- Harrison
- Henry
- Howard
- Humboldt
- Ida
- Iowa
- Jackson
- Jasper
- Jefferson
- Jones
- Keokuk
- Kossuth
- Lee
- Linn
- Lousia
- Lucas
- Madison
- Mahaska
- Marion
- Marshall
- Mills
- Mitchell
- Monona
- Montgomery
- Muscatine
- Osceola
- Palo Alto
- Plymouth
- Pocahontas
- Pottawattamie
- Poweshiek
- Ringgold
- Sac
- Scott
- Shelby
- Story
- Tama
- Taylor
- Union
- Van Buren
- Warren
- Washington
- Wayne
- Webster
- Winnebago
- Winneshiek
- Woodbury
- Worth
- Wright

== See also ==
- United States presidential elections in Iowa
