= Howard County Courthouse =

Howard County Courthouse may refer to:

- Howard County Courthouse (Arkansas), Nashville, Arkansas
- Howard County Courthouse (Iowa), Cresco, Iowa
- Howard County Courthouse (Maryland), Ellicott City, Maryland
- Howard County Courthouse (Nebraska), St. Paul, Nebraska
- Howard County Courthouse (Texas), Big Spring, Texas, one of Texas' county courthouses
