= Albion Township, Howard County, Iowa =

Township in Howard County, Iowa, U.S.

Coordinates: 43°28′N 92°08′W

Albion Township is a township in Howard County, Iowa, United States.
