= 1952 United States presidential election in Iowa =

- November 4, 1952

All 10 Iowa votes to the Electoral College

Nominee	Dwight D. Eisenhower	Adlai Stevenson
Party	Republican	Democratic
Home state	New York	Illinois
Running mate	Richard Nixon	John Sparkman
Electoral vote	10	0
Popular vote	808,906	451,513
Percentage	63.75%	35.59%
County results
Eisenhower
50–60%
60–70%
70–80%
80–90%
President before election
Harry S. Truman
Democratic
Elected President
Dwight D. Eisenhower
Republican

The 1952 United States presidential election in Iowa took place on November 4, 1952, as part of the 1952 United States presidential election. Iowa voters chose ten representatives, or electors, to the Electoral College, who voted for president and vice president.

Iowa was won by Columbia University President Dwight D. Eisenhower (R–New York), running with Senator Richard Nixon, with 63.75% of the popular vote, against Adlai Stevenson (D–Illinois), running with Senator John Sparkman, with 35.59% of the popular vote. As of the 2024 presidential election, this is the last of only two presidential elections – alongside Warren G. Harding’s triumph in 1920 – in which a candidate won every county in Iowa.

== Results ==
1952 United States presidential election in Iowa
Party	Candidate	Votes	%
Republican	Dwight D. Eisenhower	808,906	63.75%
Democratic	Adlai Stevenson	451,513	35.59%
Progressive	Vincent Hallinan	5,085	0.40%
Prohibition	Stuart Hamblen	2,882	0.23%
Socialist Workers	Darlington Hoopes	219	0.02%
Socialist Labor	Eric Hass	139	0.01%
Write-ins	Write-ins	29	0.00%
Total votes		1,268,773	100%

=== Results by county ===
County	Dwight D. Eisenhower Republican		Adlai Stevenson Democratic		Various candidates Other parties		Margin		Total votes cast
County	#	%	#	%	#	%	#	%	Total votes cast
Adair	4,497	71.09%	1,817	28.72%	12	0.19%	2,680	42.37%	6,326
Adams	3,129	69.06%	1,383	30.52%	19	0.42%	1,746	38.54%	4,531
Allamakee	6,087	72.14%	2,341	27.74%	10	0.12%	3,746	44.40%	8,438
Appanoose	5,429	55.38%	4,276	43.61%	99	1.01%	1,153	11.77%	9,804
Audubon	3,605	61.85%	2,220	38.09%	4	0.07%	1,385	23.76%	5,829
Benton	6,316	59.09%	3,831	35.84%	542	5.07%	2,485	23.25%	10,689
Black Hawk	28,671	62.01%	17,360	37.55%	203	0.44%	11,311	24.46%	46,234
Boone	7,901	61.03%	4,896	37.82%	150	1.16%	3,005	23.21%	12,947
Bremer	6,806	74.12%	2,363	25.73%	14	0.15%	4,443	48.39%	9,183
Buchanan	6,431	67.81%	3,019	31.83%	34	0.36%	3,412	35.98%	9,484
Buena Vista	7,539	69.72%	3,254	30.09%	20	0.18%	4,285	39.63%	10,813
Butler	6,360	77.47%	1,836	22.36%	14	0.17%	4,524	55.11%	8,210
Calhoun	5,391	67.68%	2,411	30.27%	164	2.06%	2,980	37.41%	7,966
Carroll	7,473	64.27%	4,139	35.60%	16	0.14%	3,334	28.67%	11,628
Cass	7,355	75.61%	2,349	24.15%	23	0.24%	5,006	51.46%	9,727
Cedar	6,176	71.48%	2,447	28.32%	17	0.20%	3,729	43.16%	8,640
Cerro Gordo	13,207	61.12%	8,354	38.66%	47	0.22%	4,853	22.46%	21,608
Cherokee	6,018	70.46%	2,502	29.29%	21	0.25%	3,516	41.17%	8,541
Chickasaw	5,022	63.18%	2,921	36.75%	6	0.08%	2,101	26.43%	7,949
Clarke	3,215	65.69%	1,653	33.78%	26	0.53%	1,562	31.91%	4,894
Clay	6,271	72.57%	2,258	26.13%	112	1.30%	4,013	46.44%	8,641
Clayton	7,669	67.22%	3,730	32.70%	9	0.08%	3,939	34.52%	11,408
Clinton	15,372	65.73%	7,975	34.10%	38	0.16%	7,397	31.63%	23,385
Crawford	5,646	63.67%	3,107	35.04%	115	1.30%	2,539	28.63%	8,868
Dallas	8,008	63.51%	4,501	35.69%	101	0.80%	3,507	27.82%	12,610
Davis	3,195	58.14%	2,283	41.55%	17	0.31%	912	16.59%	5,495
Decatur	3,621	58.71%	2,521	40.87%	26	0.42%	1,100	17.84%	6,168
Delaware	6,449	73.20%	2,351	26.69%	10	0.11%	4,098	46.51%	8,810
Des Moines	12,182	58.13%	8,686	41.45%	89	0.42%	3,496	16.68%	20,957
Dickinson	4,401	71.05%	1,748	28.22%	45	0.73%	2,653	42.83%	6,194
Dubuque	18,075	55.03%	14,542	44.27%	228	0.69%	3,533	10.76%	32,845
Emmet	4,935	71.48%	1,947	28.20%	22	0.32%	2,988	43.28%	6,904
Fayette	9,152	67.35%	4,403	32.40%	34	0.25%	4,749	34.95%	13,589
Floyd	7,042	70.04%	2,999	29.83%	13	0.13%	4,043	40.21%	10,054
Franklin	5,432	72.72%	1,941	25.98%	97	1.30%	3,491	46.74%	7,470
Fremont	3,802	64.51%	2,085	35.37%	7	0.12%	1,717	29.14%	5,894
Greene	5,378	69.62%	2,228	28.84%	119	1.54%	3,150	40.78%	7,725
Grundy	5,652	78.98%	1,483	20.72%	21	0.29%	4,169	58.26%	7,156
Guthrie	5,377	70.10%	2,281	29.74%	13	0.17%	3,096	40.36%	7,671
Hamilton	7,006	71.29%	2,788	28.37%	34	0.35%	4,218	42.92%	9,828
Hancock	5,115	71.26%	2,053	28.60%	10	0.14%	3,062	42.66%	7,178
Hardin	7,880	70.79%	3,205	28.79%	47	0.42%	4,675	42.00%	11,132
Harrison	5,972	63.76%	3,370	35.98%	24	0.26%	2,602	27.78%	9,366
Henry	6,424	71.93%	2,438	27.30%	69	0.77%	3,986	44.63%	8,931
Howard	4,305	62.56%	2,564	37.26%	12	0.17%	1,741	25.30%	6,881
Humboldt	4,534	67.94%	2,124	31.82%	16	0.24%	2,410	36.12%	6,674
Ida	3,800	70.14%	1,603	29.59%	15	0.28%	2,197	40.55%	5,418
Iowa	5,625	67.27%	2,514	30.06%	223	2.67%	3,111	37.21%	8,362
Jackson	5,867	64.28%	3,074	33.68%	186	2.04%	2,793	30.60%	9,127
Jasper	9,610	58.37%	6,756	41.03%	99	0.60%	2,854	17.34%	16,465
Jefferson	5,630	69.09%	2,470	30.31%	49	0.60%	3,160	38.78%	8,149
Johnson	11,231	58.04%	8,067	41.69%	52	0.27%	3,164	16.35%	19,350
Jones	6,070	66.90%	2,991	32.97%	12	0.13%	3,079	33.93%	9,073
Keokuk	5,712	64.20%	3,135	35.24%	50	0.56%	2,577	28.96%	8,897
Kossuth	7,765	64.15%	4,330	35.77%	10	0.08%	3,435	28.38%	12,105
Lee	12,289	58.61%	8,625	41.13%	55	0.26%	3,664	17.48%	20,969
Linn	31,383	58.72%	21,818	40.83%	240	0.45%	9,565	17.89%	53,441
Louisa	3,675	68.45%	1,673	31.16%	21	0.39%	2,002	37.29%	5,369
Lucas	3,921	63.09%	2,217	35.67%	77	1.24%	1,704	27.42%	6,215
Lyon	4,893	78.59%	1,324	21.27%	9	0.14%	3,569	57.32%	6,226
Madison	4,967	69.48%	2,131	29.81%	51	0.71%	2,836	39.67%	7,149
Mahaska	7,369	63.95%	3,745	32.50%	409	3.55%	3,624	31.45%	11,523
Marion	7,165	57.25%	5,196	41.51%	155	1.24%	1,969	15.74%	12,516
Marshall	11,135	65.93%	5,314	31.46%	441	2.61%	5,821	34.47%	16,890
Mills	4,028	69.04%	1,792	30.72%	14	0.24%	2,236	38.32%	5,834
Mitchell	5,050	69.78%	2,175	30.05%	12	0.17%	2,875	39.73%	7,237
Monona	4,849	62.29%	2,918	37.49%	17	0.22%	1,931	24.80%	7,784
Monroe	3,219	53.28%	2,785	46.09%	38	0.63%	434	7.19%	6,042
Montgomery	6,074	72.88%	2,235	26.82%	25	0.30%	3,839	46.06%	8,334
Muscatine	9,361	61.60%	5,772	37.98%	63	0.41%	3,589	23.62%	15,196
O'Brien	7,130	76.18%	2,192	23.42%	38	0.41%	4,938	52.76%	9,360
Osceola	3,573	71.73%	1,396	28.03%	12	0.24%	2,177	43.70%	4,981
Page	8,840	76.52%	2,669	23.10%	44	0.38%	6,171	53.42%	11,553
Palo Alto	4,595	60.48%	2,993	39.40%	9	0.12%	1,602	21.08%	7,597
Plymouth	8,140	74.29%	2,768	25.26%	49	0.45%	5,372	49.03%	10,957
Pocahontas	4,472	61.73%	2,517	34.74%	256	3.53%	1,955	26.99%	7,245
Polk	60,934	54.03%	50,867	45.10%	982	0.87%	10,067	8.93%	112,783
Pottawattamie	18,894	61.24%	11,897	38.56%	63	0.20%	6,997	22.68%	30,854
Poweshiek	6,105	64.28%	3,318	34.93%	75	0.79%	2,787	29.35%	9,498
Ringgold	3,442	70.66%	1,408	28.91%	21	0.43%	2,034	41.75%	4,871
Sac	6,417	72.15%	2,451	27.56%	26	0.29%	3,966	44.59%	8,894
Scott	29,719	61.88%	17,807	37.08%	500	1.04%	11,912	24.80%	48,026
Shelby	5,135	64.68%	2,762	34.79%	42	0.53%	2,373	29.89%	7,939
Sioux	10,275	83.21%	2,050	16.60%	24	0.19%	8,225	66.61%	12,349
Story	13,857	71.81%	5,299	27.46%	140	0.73%	8,558	44.35%	19,296
Tama	7,061	63.30%	4,076	36.54%	17	0.15%	2,985	26.76%	11,154
Taylor	4,608	71.74%	1,784	27.78%	31	0.48%	2,824	43.96%	6,423
Union	5,742	68.92%	2,566	30.80%	24	0.29%	3,176	38.12%	8,332
Van Buren	3,870	70.62%	1,577	28.78%	33	0.60%	2,293	41.84%	5,480
Wapello	11,571	52.24%	10,449	47.17%	130	0.59%	1,122	5.07%	22,150
Warren	5,911	65.55%	3,042	33.74%	64	0.71%	2,869	31.81%	9,017
Washington	6,946	72.47%	2,604	27.17%	35	0.37%	4,342	45.30%	9,585
Wayne	3,995	61.23%	2,497	38.27%	33	0.51%	1,498	22.96%	6,525
Webster	12,336	57.69%	8,681	40.59%	368	1.72%	3,655	17.10%	21,385
Winnebago	4,574	70.38%	1,905	29.31%	20	0.31%	2,669	41.07%	6,499
Winneshiek	7,154	66.64%	3,560	33.16%	22	0.20%	3,594	33.48%	10,736
Woodbury	27,518	58.36%	19,474	41.30%	159	0.34%	8,044	17.06%	47,151
Worth	3,315	61.34%	2,075	38.40%	14	0.26%	1,240	22.94%	5,404
Wright	6,566	67.12%	3,186	32.57%	31	0.32%	3,380	34.55%	9,783
Totals	808,906	63.75%	451,513	35.59%	8,354	0.66%	357,393	28.16%	1,268,773

==== Counties that flipped from Democratic to Republican ====
- Appanoose
- Audubon
- Benton
- Black Hawk
- Boone
- Buena Vista
- Calhoun
- Carroll
- Cerro Gordo
- Chickasaw
- Cherokee
- Clay
- Crawford
- Davis
- Dallas
- Decatur
- Des Moines
- Dickinson
- Dubuque
- Emmet
- Franklin
- Guthrie
- Hamilton
- Hancock
- Harrison
- Howard
- Humboldt
- Ida
- Jasper
- Johnson
- Kossuth
- Lee
- Linn
- Lucas
- Mahaska
- Marion
- Monona
- Monroe
- Osceola
- Palo Alto
- Pocahontas
- Polk
- Poweshiek
- Sac
- Shelby
- Tama
- Wapello
- Wayne
- Webster
- Winneshiek
- Woodbury
- Worth
- Wright

== See also ==
- United States presidential elections in Iowa
