= 1920 United States presidential election in Iowa =

- November 2, 1920
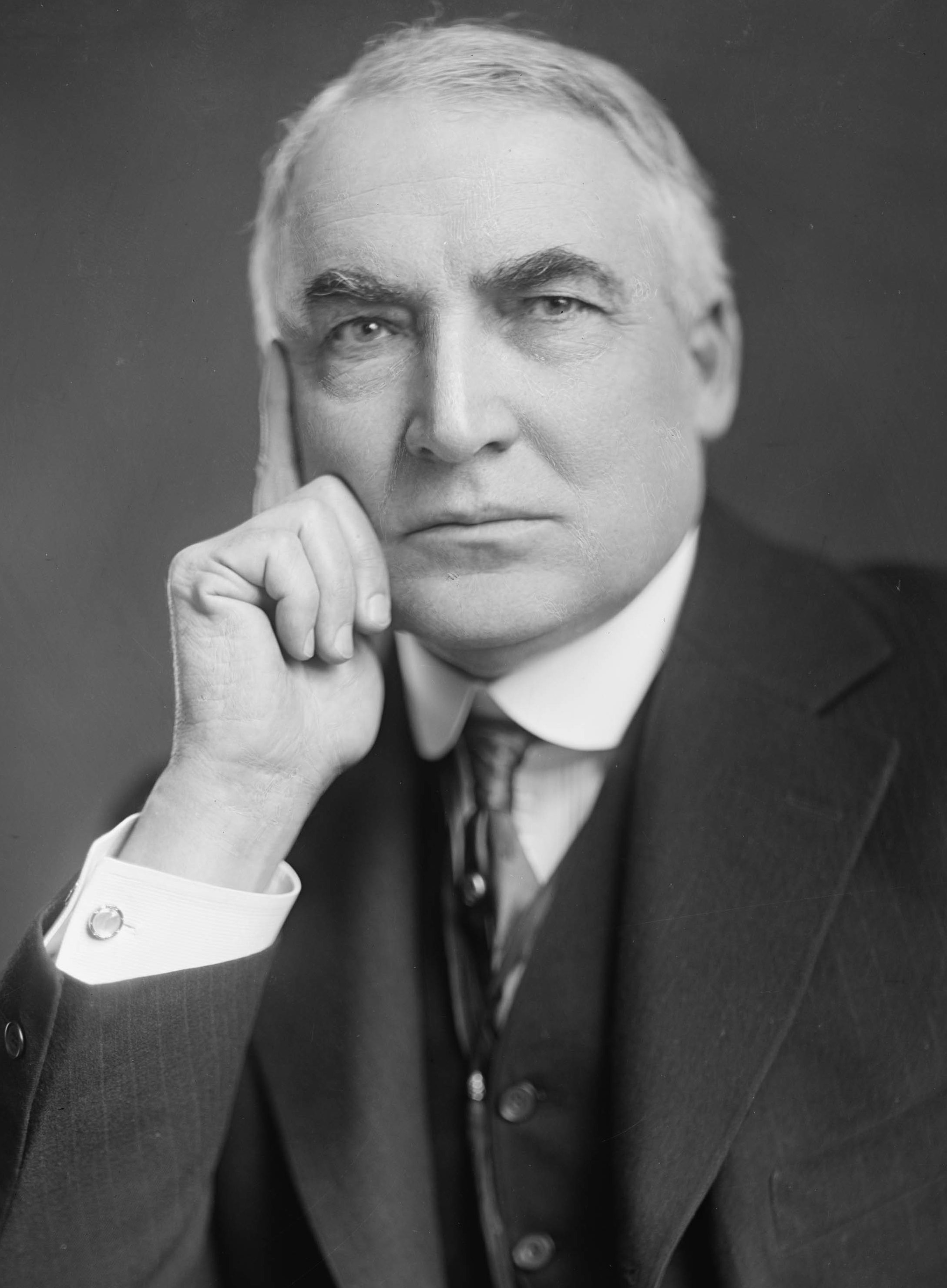

Nominee	Warren G. Harding	James M. Cox
Party	Republican	Democratic
Home state	Ohio	Ohio
Running mate	Calvin Coolidge	Franklin D. Roosevelt
Electoral vote	13	0
Popular vote	634,674	227,921
Percentage	70.91%	25.46%
County results
Harding
50–60%
60–70%
70–80%
80–90%
President before election
Woodrow Wilson
Democratic
Elected President
Warren G. Harding
Republican

The 1920 United States presidential election in Iowa took place on November 2, 1920, as part of the 1920 United States presidential election which was held throughout all contemporary 48 states. Voters chose 13 representatives, or electors to the Electoral College, who voted for president and vice president.

Iowa voted for the Republican nominee, Senator Warren G. Harding of Ohio, over the Democratic nominee, Governor James M. Cox of Ohio. Harding ran with Governor Calvin Coolidge of Massachusetts, while Cox ran with Assistant Secretary of the Navy Franklin D. Roosevelt of New York. Harding won the state by a margin of 45.45%.

With 70.91 percent of the popular, Iowa would prove to be Harding's fifth strongest state in the 1920 election terms of popular vote percentage after North Dakota, Vermont, Michigan, and Wisconsin. Harding's performance is, by a margin of 6.79 percent, the best by any candidate in Iowa presidential election history, and he and Dwight D. Eisenhower in 1952 are the only presidential candidates to sweep all of Iowa's counties.

== Results ==
1920 United States presidential election in Iowa
Party	Candidate	Running mate	Popular vote		Electoral vote	
Party	Candidate	Running mate	Count	%	Count	%
Republican	Warren Gamaliel Harding of Ohio	Calvin Coolidge of Massachusetts	634,674	70.91%	13	100.00%
Democratic	James Middleton Cox of Ohio	Franklin Delano Roosevelt of New York	227,921	25.46%	0	0.00%
Socialist	Eugene Victor Debs of Indiana	Seymour Stedman of Illinois	16,981	1.90%	0	0.00%
Farmer–Labor	Parley P. Christensen of Illinois	Max S. Hayes of Ohio	10,321	1.15%	0	0.00%
Prohibition	Aaron S. Watkins of Indiana	D. Leigh Colvin of New York	4,197	0.47%	0	0.00%
Socialist Labor	William Wesley Cox of Missouri	August Gillhaus of New York	982	0.11%	0	0.00%
N/A	Others	Others	6	<0.00%	0	0.00%
Total			895,082	100.00%	13	100.00%

=== Results by county ===
County	Warren Gamaliel Harding Republican		James Middleton Cox Democratic		Eugene Victor Debs Socialist		Parley Parker Christensen Farmer-Labor		Various candidates Other parties		Margin		Total votes cast
County	#	%	#	%	#	%	#	%	#	%	#	%	Total votes cast
Adair	4,133	74.29%	1,358	24.41%	34	0.61%	19	0.34%	19	0.34%	2,775	49.88%	5,563
Adams	2,845	62.43%	1,670	36.65%	14	0.31%	12	0.26%	16	0.35%	1,175	25.78%	4,557
Allamakee	5,192	73.23%	1,833	25.85%	48	0.68%	14	0.20%	3	0.04%	3,359	47.38%	7,090
Appanoose	6,382	65.50%	2,952	30.30%	339	3.48%	9	0.09%	61	0.63%	3,430	35.20%	9,743
Audubon	2,963	67.68%	1,405	32.09%	6	0.14%	4	0.09%	0	0.00%	1,558	35.59%	4,378
Benton	6,539	71.02%	2,343	25.45%	128	1.39%	168	1.82%	29	0.31%	4,196	45.57%	9,207
Black Hawk	16,920	76.56%	4,000	18.10%	487	2.20%	547	2.48%	147	0.67%	12,920	58.46%	22,101
Boone	7,093	71.07%	2,240	22.44%	423	4.24%	112	1.12%	112	1.12%	4,853	48.63%	9,980
Bremer	6,287	86.49%	902	12.41%	32	0.44%	33	0.45%	15	0.21%	5,385	74.08%	7,269
Buchanan	6,334	79.20%	1,600	20.01%	17	0.21%	13	0.16%	33	0.41%	4,734	59.20%	7,997
Buena Vista	4,927	78.58%	1,204	19.20%	102	1.63%	17	0.27%	20	0.32%	3,723	59.38%	6,270
Butler	5,900	86.69%	830	12.20%	36	0.53%	17	0.25%	23	0.34%	5,070	74.49%	6,806
Calhoun	5,277	76.95%	1,479	21.57%	38	0.55%	32	0.47%	32	0.47%	3,798	55.38%	6,858
Carroll	6,320	72.89%	2,174	25.07%	69	0.80%	81	0.93%	27	0.31%	4,146	47.81%	8,671
Cass	6,558	78.23%	1,668	19.90%	104	1.24%	30	0.36%	23	0.27%	4,890	58.33%	8,383
Cedar	5,697	77.88%	1,420	19.41%	140	1.91%	27	0.37%	31	0.42%	4,277	58.47%	7,315
Cerro Gordo	8,293	75.73%	2,302	21.02%	138	1.26%	146	1.33%	72	0.66%	5,991	54.71%	10,951
Cherokee	4,544	77.69%	1,211	20.70%	33	0.56%	31	0.53%	30	0.51%	3,333	56.98%	5,849
Chickasaw	4,517	66.98%	2,171	32.19%	22	0.33%	21	0.31%	13	0.19%	2,346	34.79%	6,744
Clarke	3,150	70.79%	1,257	28.25%	18	0.40%	4	0.09%	21	0.47%	1,893	42.54%	4,450
Clay	4,471	80.05%	1,001	17.92%	53	0.95%	19	0.34%	41	0.73%	3,470	62.13%	5,585
Clayton	6,747	77.50%	1,808	20.77%	104	1.19%	24	0.28%	23	0.26%	4,939	56.73%	8,706
Clinton	11,746	66.98%	3,153	17.98%	122	0.70%	2,444	13.94%	71	0.40%	8,593	49.00%	17,536
Crawford	5,473	68.65%	2,151	26.98%	194	2.43%	112	1.40%	42	0.53%	3,322	41.67%	7,972
Dallas	6,677	70.63%	2,577	27.26%	93	0.98%	29	0.31%	78	0.83%	4,100	43.37%	9,454
Davis	3,117	56.31%	2,353	42.51%	32	0.58%	8	0.14%	25	0.45%	764	13.80%	5,535
Decatur	4,187	61.17%	2,592	37.87%	30	0.44%	7	0.10%	29	0.42%	1,595	23.30%	6,845
Delaware	5,880	82.96%	1,111	15.67%	39	0.55%	35	0.49%	23	0.32%	4,769	67.28%	7,088
Des Moines	8,287	63.76%	3,449	26.54%	886	6.82%	242	1.86%	133	1.02%	4,838	37.22%	12,997
Dickinson	3,298	80.42%	760	18.53%	23	0.56%	8	0.20%	12	0.29%	2,538	61.89%	4,101
Dubuque	12,436	59.22%	7,636	36.36%	678	3.23%	204	0.97%	46	0.22%	4,800	22.86%	21,000
Emmet	3,360	76.00%	991	22.42%	30	0.68%	29	0.66%	11	0.25%	2,369	53.59%	4,421
Fayette	8,265	79.14%	1,941	18.58%	118	1.13%	53	0.51%	67	0.64%	6,324	60.55%	10,444
Floyd	6,106	84.84%	933	12.96%	97	1.35%	32	0.44%	29	0.40%	5,173	71.88%	7,197
Franklin	4,397	86.06%	601	11.76%	66	1.29%	13	0.25%	32	0.63%	3,796	74.30%	5,109
Fremont	3,776	59.33%	2,524	39.66%	37	0.58%	3	0.05%	24	0.38%	1,252	19.67%	6,364
Greene	5,102	78.98%	1,303	20.17%	23	0.36%	16	0.25%	16	0.25%	3,799	58.81%	6,460
Grundy	4,662	85.82%	714	13.14%	21	0.39%	28	0.52%	7	0.13%	3,948	72.68%	5,432
Guthrie	5,338	75.19%	1,647	23.20%	24	0.34%	20	0.28%	70	0.99%	3,691	51.99%	7,099
Hamilton	5,924	82.88%	1,126	15.75%	38	0.53%	25	0.35%	35	0.49%	4,798	67.12%	7,148
Hancock	3,617	80.84%	725	16.20%	16	0.36%	94	2.10%	22	0.49%	2,892	64.64%	4,474
Hardin	6,646	83.97%	1,076	13.59%	98	1.24%	28	0.35%	67	0.85%	5,570	70.37%	7,915
Harrison	6,127	62.89%	3,479	35.71%	66	0.68%	22	0.23%	48	0.49%	2,648	27.18%	9,742
Henry	5,254	71.91%	1,939	26.54%	38	0.52%	25	0.34%	50	0.68%	3,315	45.37%	7,306
Howard	3,601	66.46%	1,717	31.69%	51	0.94%	20	0.37%	29	0.54%	1,884	34.77%	5,418
Humboldt	3,577	82.82%	681	15.77%	21	0.49%	30	0.69%	10	0.23%	2,896	67.05%	4,319
Ida	3,547	75.73%	1,090	23.27%	28	0.60%	10	0.21%	9	0.19%	2,457	52.46%	4,684
Iowa	4,892	69.92%	2,019	28.86%	48	0.69%	15	0.21%	23	0.33%	2,873	41.06%	6,997
Jackson	4,763	67.99%	1,954	27.89%	175	2.50%	70	1.00%	43	0.61%	2,809	40.10%	7,005
Jasper	7,417	67.25%	3,390	30.74%	124	1.12%	19	0.17%	79	0.72%	4,027	36.51%	11,029
Jefferson	4,558	74.62%	1,450	23.74%	34	0.56%	13	0.21%	53	0.87%	3,108	50.88%	6,108
Johnson	5,696	52.15%	5,032	46.07%	136	1.25%	27	0.25%	32	0.29%	664	6.08%	10,923
Jones	5,962	70.46%	2,436	28.79%	39	0.46%	14	0.17%	10	0.12%	3,526	41.67%	8,461
Keokuk	6,207	67.95%	2,800	30.65%	47	0.51%	28	0.31%	53	0.58%	3,407	37.30%	9,135
Kossuth	6,018	77.46%	1,682	21.65%	26	0.33%	35	0.45%	8	0.10%	4,336	55.81%	7,769
Lee	10,763	65.94%	5,177	31.72%	180	1.10%	133	0.81%	70	0.43%	5,586	34.22%	16,323
Linn	20,036	72.02%	6,932	24.92%	535	1.92%	114	0.41%	204	0.73%	13,104	47.10%	27,821
Louisa	3,560	77.49%	932	20.29%	53	1.15%	16	0.35%	33	0.72%	2,628	57.21%	4,594
Lucas	3,775	68.56%	1,463	26.57%	157	2.85%	19	0.35%	92	1.67%	2,312	41.99%	5,506
Lyon	3,633	81.48%	729	16.35%	57	1.28%	38	0.85%	2	0.04%	2,904	65.13%	4,459
Madison	4,465	68.83%	1,899	29.27%	44	0.68%	11	0.17%	68	1.05%	2,566	39.56%	6,487
Mahaska	6,739	64.55%	3,339	31.98%	110	1.05%	17	0.16%	235	2.25%	3,400	32.57%	10,440
Marion	5,435	56.62%	3,861	40.22%	213	2.22%	24	0.25%	66	0.69%	1,574	16.40%	9,599
Marshall	9,334	79.10%	2,166	18.36%	196	1.66%	25	0.21%	79	0.67%	7,168	60.75%	11,800
Mills	3,683	69.00%	1,592	29.82%	36	0.67%	8	0.15%	19	0.36%	2,091	39.17%	5,338
Mitchell	4,476	83.95%	773	14.50%	47	0.88%	19	0.36%	17	0.32%	3,703	69.45%	5,332
Monona	4,569	69.49%	1,960	29.81%	29	0.44%	9	0.14%	8	0.12%	2,609	39.68%	6,575
Monroe	4,500	61.21%	2,081	28.31%	665	9.05%	51	0.69%	55	0.75%	2,419	32.90%	7,352
Montgomery	4,980	76.50%	1,404	21.57%	78	1.20%	11	0.17%	37	0.57%	3,576	54.93%	6,510
Muscatine	8,115	70.30%	2,293	19.86%	1,040	9.01%	49	0.42%	47	0.41%	5,822	50.43%	11,544
O'Brien	5,137	76.51%	1,468	21.86%	68	1.01%	22	0.33%	19	0.28%	3,669	54.65%	6,714
Osceola	2,717	76.73%	754	21.29%	46	1.30%	18	0.51%	6	0.17%	1,963	55.44%	3,541
Page	6,949	76.10%	1,931	21.15%	126	1.38%	22	0.24%	103	1.13%	5,018	54.96%	9,131
Palo Alto	3,904	71.42%	1,467	26.84%	43	0.79%	41	0.75%	11	0.20%	2,437	44.58%	5,466
Plymouth	6,090	76.16%	1,801	22.52%	31	0.39%	51	0.64%	23	0.29%	4,289	53.64%	7,996
Pocahontas	4,046	70.07%	1,639	28.39%	47	0.81%	24	0.42%	18	0.31%	2,407	41.69%	5,774
Polk	36,073	66.82%	16,281	30.16%	978	1.81%	417	0.77%	237	0.44%	19,792	36.66%	53,986
Pottawattamie	13,506	64.66%	6,659	31.88%	279	1.34%	373	1.79%	70	0.34%	6,847	32.78%	20,887
Poweshiek	5,806	71.41%	2,125	26.14%	99	1.22%	28	0.34%	72	0.89%	3,681	45.28%	8,130
Ringgold	3,702	72.66%	1,327	26.05%	15	0.29%	9	0.18%	42	0.82%	2,375	46.61%	5,095
Sac	4,984	78.69%	1,268	20.02%	39	0.62%	10	0.16%	33	0.52%	3,716	58.67%	6,334
Scott	16,233	58.75%	5,473	19.81%	4,101	14.84%	1,335	4.83%	489	1.77%	10,760	38.94%	27,631
Shelby	4,621	70.55%	1,882	28.73%	29	0.44%	9	0.14%	9	0.14%	2,739	41.82%	6,550
Sioux	6,068	79.29%	1,510	19.73%	36	0.47%	16	0.21%	23	0.30%	4,558	59.56%	7,653
Story	8,713	80.80%	1,909	17.70%	50	0.46%	33	0.31%	79	0.73%	6,804	63.09%	10,784
Tama	6,352	70.01%	2,552	28.13%	93	1.03%	23	0.25%	53	0.58%	3,800	41.88%	9,073
Taylor	4,997	72.41%	1,757	25.46%	37	0.54%	33	0.48%	77	1.12%	3,240	46.95%	6,901
Union	4,466	65.63%	2,228	32.74%	48	0.71%	16	0.24%	47	0.69%	2,238	32.89%	6,805
Van Buren	4,321	71.00%	1,682	27.64%	49	0.81%	12	0.20%	22	0.36%	2,639	43.36%	6,086
Wapello	9,884	67.99%	4,131	28.42%	409	2.81%	42	0.29%	71	0.49%	5,753	39.57%	14,537
Warren	5,323	70.51%	2,066	27.37%	34	0.45%	15	0.20%	111	1.47%	3,257	43.14%	7,549
Washington	5,813	71.09%	2,257	27.60%	32	0.39%	15	0.18%	60	0.73%	3,556	43.49%	8,177
Wayne	4,234	62.51%	2,434	35.94%	53	0.78%	9	0.13%	43	0.63%	1,800	26.58%	6,773
Webster	8,312	64.00%	2,804	21.59%	134	1.03%	1,676	12.90%	62	0.48%	5,508	42.41%	12,988
Winnebago	3,931	87.08%	469	10.39%	46	1.02%	32	0.71%	36	0.80%	3,462	76.69%	4,514
Winneshiek	6,684	75.98%	1,933	21.97%	102	1.16%	54	0.61%	24	0.27%	4,751	54.01%	8,797
Woodbury	17,603	62.07%	9,815	34.61%	545	1.92%	247	0.87%	152	0.54%	7,788	27.46%	28,362
Worth	3,401	84.83%	516	12.87%	34	0.85%	37	0.92%	21	0.52%	2,885	71.96%	4,009
Wright	5,739	81.04%	1,205	17.01%	55	0.78%	20	0.28%	63	0.89%	4,534	64.02%	7,082
Totals	634,674	70.92%	227,804	25.45%	16,981	1.90%	10,321	1.15%	5,185	0.58%	406,870	45.46%	894,965

== See also ==
- United States presidential elections in Iowa
