= Saratoga Township, Howard County, Iowa =

Township in Howard County, Iowa, U.S.

Coordinates: 43°23′N 92°23′W

Saratoga Township is a township in Howard County, Iowa, United States. Per 2020 Decennial census, township had a total population of 245
