= Vernon Springs Township, Howard County, Iowa =

Township in Iowa, USA

Coordinates: 43°23′N 92°08′W

Vernon Springs Township is a township in Howard County, Iowa, United States.
