= Paris Township, Howard County, Iowa =

Township in Iowa, US

Coordinates: 43°17′N 92°16′W

Paris Township is a township in Howard County, Iowa, United States.
