= 1972 United States presidential election in Iowa =

- November 7, 1972

Nominee	Richard Nixon	George McGovern
Party	Republican	Democratic
Home state	California	South Dakota
Running mate	Spiro Agnew	Sargent Shriver
Electoral vote	8	0
Popular vote	706,207	496,206
Percentage	57.61%	40.48%
County results
Nixon
50–60%
60–70%
70–80%
McGovern
40–50%
50–60%
President before election
Richard Nixon
Republican
Elected President
Richard Nixon
Republican

The 1972 United States presidential election in Iowa took place on November 7, 1972. All 50 states and the District of Columbia were part of the 1972 United States presidential election. Iowa voters chose eight electors to the Electoral College, who voted for president and vice president.

Iowa was won by the Republican nominees, incumbent President Richard Nixon of California and his running mate Vice President Spiro Agnew of Maryland. Nixon and Agnew defeated the Democratic nominees, Senator George McGovern of neighboring South Dakota and his running mate U.S. Ambassador Sargent Shriver of Maryland.

Nixon carried Iowa with 57.61 percent of the vote to McGovern's 40.48 percent, a victory margin of 17.13 percent, making Iowa about 6% more Democratic than the nation-at-large. This would be the last time until Donald Trump in 2016 when a Republican presidential candidate won Wapello County and Des Moines County.

== Results ==
1972 United States presidential election in Iowa
Party	Candidate	Votes	%
Republican	Richard Nixon (incumbent)	706,207	57.61%
Democratic	George McGovern	496,206	40.48%
American Independent	John G. Schmitz	22,056	1.80%
Socialist Workers	Linda Jenness	448	0.04%
Independent	Write-ins	321	0.03%
Communist	Gus Hall	272	0.02%
Independent	Gabriel Green	199	0.02%
Socialist Labor	Louis Fisher	195	0.02%
Total votes		1,225,944	100%

=== Results by county ===
County	Richard Nixon Republican		George McGovern Democratic		John G. Schmitz American Independent		Various candidates Other parties		Margin		Total votes cast
County	#	%	#	%	#	%	#	%	#	%	Total votes cast
Adair	3,041	63.59%	1,642	34.34%	95	1.99%	4	0.08%	1,399	29.25%	4,782
Adams	1,814	59.57%	1,161	38.13%	70	2.30%	0	0.00%	653	21.44%	3,045
Allamakee	4,150	63.24%	2,271	34.61%	135	2.06%	6	0.09%	1,879	28.63%	6,562
Appanoose	4,321	64.04%	2,283	33.84%	137	2.03%	6	0.09%	2,038	30.20%	6,747
Audubon	2,515	61.61%	1,533	37.56%	32	0.78%	2	0.05%	982	24.05%	4,082
Benton	5,273	54.09%	4,282	43.92%	183	1.88%	11	0.11%	991	10.17%	9,749
Black Hawk	30,929	57.51%	21,721	40.39%	1,022	1.90%	110	0.20%	9,208	17.12%	53,782
Boone	6,271	54.29%	5,057	43.78%	214	1.85%	9	0.08%	1,214	10.51%	11,551
Bremer	6,333	65.89%	3,122	32.48%	150	1.56%	6	0.06%	3,211	33.41%	9,611
Buchanan	5,277	58.32%	3,609	39.89%	143	1.58%	19	0.21%	1,668	18.43%	9,048
Buena Vista	5,685	61.25%	3,460	37.28%	133	1.43%	3	0.03%	2,225	23.97%	9,281
Butler	4,615	71.82%	1,682	26.17%	126	1.96%	3	0.05%	2,933	45.65%	6,426
Calhoun	3,821	60.00%	2,446	38.41%	98	1.54%	3	0.05%	1,375	21.59%	6,368
Carroll	4,415	47.55%	4,608	49.63%	254	2.74%	8	0.09%	-193	-2.08%	9,285
Cass	5,234	72.06%	1,923	26.48%	97	1.34%	9	0.12%	3,311	45.58%	7,263
Cedar	4,452	63.39%	2,465	35.10%	98	1.40%	8	0.11%	1,987	28.29%	7,023
Cerro Gordo	11,856	54.65%	9,460	43.61%	358	1.65%	19	0.09%	2,396	11.04%	21,693
Cherokee	4,726	62.23%	2,780	36.61%	78	1.03%	10	0.13%	1,946	25.62%	7,594
Chickasaw	3,836	54.57%	3,134	44.58%	59	0.84%	1	0.01%	702	9.99%	7,030
Clarke	2,214	56.75%	1,590	40.76%	97	2.49%	0	0.00%	624	15.99%	3,901
Clay	4,564	59.30%	2,887	37.51%	235	3.05%	10	0.13%	1,677	21.79%	7,696
Clayton	5,447	60.20%	3,366	37.20%	218	2.41%	17	0.19%	2,081	23.00%	9,048
Clinton	12,768	55.60%	9,895	43.09%	275	1.20%	26	0.11%	2,873	12.51%	22,964
Crawford	4,493	58.60%	3,018	39.36%	145	1.89%	11	0.14%	1,475	19.24%	7,667
Dallas	6,143	53.72%	5,085	44.46%	192	1.68%	16	0.14%	1,058	9.26%	11,436
Davis	2,287	54.61%	1,806	43.12%	94	2.24%	1	0.02%	481	11.49%	4,188
Decatur	2,638	57.44%	1,880	40.93%	67	1.46%	8	0.17%	758	16.51%	4,593
Delaware	4,848	61.21%	2,944	37.17%	120	1.52%	8	0.10%	1,904	24.04%	7,920
Des Moines	10,216	52.77%	8,869	45.82%	258	1.33%	15	0.08%	1,347	6.95%	19,358
Dickinson	3,739	58.60%	2,373	37.19%	259	4.06%	10	0.16%	1,366	21.41%	6,381
Dubuque	17,272	47.29%	18,417	50.43%	806	2.21%	26	0.07%	-1,145	-3.14%	36,521
Emmet	3,436	62.92%	1,970	36.07%	53	0.97%	2	0.04%	1,466	26.85%	5,461
Fayette	7,263	60.83%	4,413	36.96%	247	2.07%	17	0.14%	2,850	23.87%	11,940
Floyd	4,726	57.69%	3,338	40.75%	121	1.48%	7	0.09%	1,388	16.94%	8,192
Franklin	3,643	62.96%	1,986	34.32%	153	2.64%	4	0.07%	1,657	28.64%	5,786
Fremont	2,642	67.62%	1,210	30.97%	51	1.31%	4	0.10%	1,432	36.65%	3,907
Greene	3,371	59.35%	2,152	37.89%	154	2.71%	3	0.05%	1,219	21.46%	5,680
Grundy	4,706	71.03%	1,844	27.83%	70	1.06%	5	0.08%	2,862	43.20%	6,625
Guthrie	3,655	60.69%	2,258	37.50%	108	1.79%	1	0.02%	1,397	23.19%	6,022
Hamilton	4,803	60.87%	2,913	36.92%	170	2.15%	4	0.05%	1,890	23.95%	7,890
Hancock	3,706	60.47%	2,349	38.33%	71	1.16%	3	0.05%	1,357	22.14%	6,129
Hardin	5,869	61.42%	3,516	36.79%	160	1.67%	11	0.12%	2,353	24.63%	9,556
Harrison	4,721	65.83%	2,369	33.04%	71	0.99%	10	0.14%	2,352	32.79%	7,171
Henry	5,066	64.26%	2,721	34.51%	94	1.19%	3	0.04%	2,345	29.75%	7,884
Howard	2,980	54.37%	2,439	44.50%	59	1.08%	3	0.05%	541	9.87%	5,481
Humboldt	3,622	62.53%	2,062	35.60%	105	1.81%	3	0.05%	1,560	26.93%	5,792
Ida	2,819	64.67%	1,490	34.18%	50	1.15%	0	0.00%	1,329	30.49%	4,359
Iowa	4,202	60.34%	2,578	37.02%	179	2.57%	5	0.07%	1,624	23.32%	6,964
Jackson	4,975	55.75%	3,704	41.51%	237	2.66%	8	0.09%	1,271	14.24%	8,924
Jasper	9,133	55.31%	7,007	42.43%	364	2.20%	9	0.05%	2,126	12.88%	16,513
Jefferson	4,628	64.83%	2,362	33.09%	144	2.02%	5	0.07%	2,266	31.74%	7,139
Johnson	14,823	40.91%	20,922	57.74%	372	1.03%	119	0.33%	-6,099	-16.83%	36,236
Jones	4,962	58.23%	3,468	40.70%	88	1.03%	3	0.04%	1,494	17.53%	8,521
Keokuk	3,831	58.35%	2,619	39.89%	106	1.61%	9	0.14%	1,212	18.46%	6,565
Kossuth	5,841	56.39%	4,393	42.41%	121	1.17%	3	0.03%	1,448	13.98%	10,358
Lee	9,748	55.33%	7,510	42.63%	345	1.96%	15	0.09%	2,238	12.70%	17,618
Linn	36,503	52.78%	31,370	45.36%	1,187	1.72%	100	0.14%	5,133	7.42%	69,160
Louisa	2,806	61.31%	1,707	37.30%	63	1.38%	1	0.02%	1,099	24.01%	4,577
Lucas	2,851	60.79%	1,759	37.51%	78	1.66%	2	0.04%	1,092	23.28%	4,690
Lyon	3,788	72.12%	1,407	26.79%	52	0.99%	5	0.10%	2,381	45.33%	5,252
Madison	3,480	59.35%	2,234	38.10%	148	2.52%	2	0.03%	1,246	21.25%	5,864
Mahaska	6,374	63.82%	3,382	33.86%	220	2.20%	12	0.12%	2,992	29.96%	9,988
Marion	6,583	57.09%	4,643	40.27%	290	2.51%	15	0.13%	1,940	16.82%	11,531
Marshall	10,798	60.85%	6,618	37.30%	304	1.71%	24	0.14%	4,180	23.55%	17,744
Mills	3,531	74.94%	1,060	22.50%	114	2.42%	7	0.15%	2,471	52.44%	4,712
Mitchell	3,395	57.44%	2,449	41.43%	66	1.12%	1	0.02%	946	16.01%	5,911
Monona	3,237	58.91%	2,189	39.84%	66	1.20%	3	0.05%	1,048	19.07%	5,495
Monroe	2,357	56.73%	1,736	41.78%	58	1.40%	4	0.10%	621	14.95%	4,155
Montgomery	4,391	72.69%	1,559	25.81%	88	1.46%	3	0.05%	2,832	46.88%	6,041
Muscatine	8,436	61.84%	4,917	36.04%	270	1.98%	19	0.14%	3,519	25.80%	13,642
O'Brien	5,159	68.87%	2,224	29.69%	102	1.36%	6	0.08%	2,935	39.18%	7,491
Osceola	2,262	62.56%	1,317	36.42%	36	1.00%	1	0.03%	945	26.14%	3,616
Page	6,200	76.43%	1,790	22.07%	114	1.41%	8	0.10%	4,410	54.36%	8,112
Palo Alto	3,141	51.78%	2,845	46.90%	75	1.24%	5	0.08%	296	4.88%	6,066
Plymouth	6,339	60.57%	4,033	38.53%	92	0.88%	2	0.02%	2,306	22.04%	10,466
Pocahontas	3,138	57.19%	2,241	40.84%	102	1.86%	6	0.11%	897	16.35%	5,487
Polk	70,245	52.95%	59,169	44.60%	2,988	2.25%	257	0.19%	11,076	8.35%	132,659
Pottawattamie	19,722	69.32%	8,074	28.38%	628	2.21%	26	0.09%	11,648	40.94%	28,450
Poweshiek	4,785	55.33%	3,718	42.99%	134	1.55%	11	0.13%	1,067	12.34%	8,648
Ringgold	2,264	68.54%	1,003	30.37%	34	1.03%	2	0.06%	1,261	38.17%	3,303
Sac	4,017	61.41%	2,452	37.49%	67	1.02%	5	0.08%	1,565	23.92%	6,541
Scott	34,135	57.41%	23,810	40.05%	1,440	2.42%	70	0.12%	10,325	17.36%	59,455
Shelby	4,052	62.93%	2,259	35.08%	117	1.82%	11	0.17%	1,793	27.85%	6,439
Sioux	10,721	78.27%	2,867	20.93%	82	0.60%	27	0.20%	7,854	57.34%	13,697
Story	16,617	53.56%	13,972	45.03%	377	1.22%	59	0.19%	2,645	8.53%	31,025
Tama	5,058	56.96%	3,693	41.59%	117	1.32%	12	0.14%	1,365	15.37%	8,880
Taylor	3,042	70.16%	1,247	28.76%	46	1.06%	1	0.02%	1,795	41.40%	4,336
Union	3,734	62.47%	2,112	35.34%	123	2.06%	8	0.13%	1,622	27.13%	5,977
Van Buren	2,272	63.18%	1,268	35.26%	55	1.53%	1	0.03%	1,004	27.92%	3,596
Wapello	9,301	51.19%	8,348	45.94%	490	2.70%	32	0.18%	953	5.25%	18,171
Warren	7,332	57.26%	5,143	40.17%	320	2.50%	9	0.07%	2,189	17.09%	12,804
Washington	5,187	64.12%	2,784	34.42%	116	1.43%	2	0.02%	2,403	29.70%	8,089
Wayne	2,681	62.00%	1,574	36.40%	69	1.60%	0	0.00%	1,107	25.60%	4,324
Webster	11,133	55.96%	8,358	42.01%	385	1.94%	17	0.09%	2,775	13.95%	19,893
Winnebago	4,300	64.48%	2,324	34.85%	41	0.61%	4	0.06%	1,976	29.63%	6,669
Winneshiek	5,877	56.23%	4,401	42.11%	165	1.58%	9	0.09%	1,476	14.12%	10,452
Woodbury	23,757	57.34%	16,974	40.97%	662	1.60%	37	0.09%	6,783	16.37%	41,430
Worth	2,564	55.31%	2,034	43.87%	36	0.78%	2	0.04%	530	11.44%	4,636
Wright	4,278	59.73%	2,780	38.82%	98	1.37%	6	0.08%	1,498	20.91%	7,162
Totals	706,207	57.61%	496,206	40.48%	22,056	1.80%	1,475	0.12%	210,001	17.13%	1,225,944

== See also ==
- United States presidential elections in Iowa
