= Howard County, Iowa =

County in Iowa, United States

- County
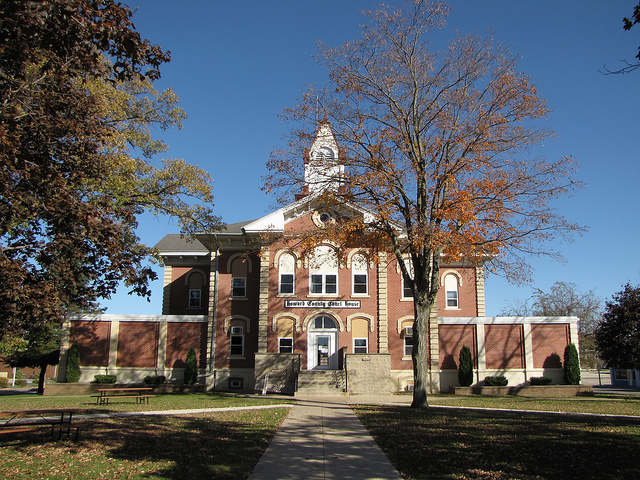
- The Howard County Courthouse in Cresco

- Location within the U.S. state of Iowa
- Coordinates: 43°21′27″N 92°18′56″W
- Country: United States
- State: Iowa
- Founded: 1851
- Named for: Tilghman Howard
- Seat: Cresco
- Largest city: Cresco

Area
  - Total: 474 sq mi (1,230 km^{2})
  - Land: 473 sq mi (1,230 km^{2})
  - Water: 0.4 sq mi (1.0 km^{2}) 0.08%

Population (2020)
  - Total: 9,469
  - Estimate (2025): 9,415 ▼
  - Density: 20.0/sq mi (7.73/km^{2})
- Time zone: UTC−6 (Central)
  - Summer (DST): UTC−5 (CDT)
- Congressional district: 1st
- Website: howardcounty.iowa.gov
- Iowa county number 45

Howard County is a county located in the US state of Iowa. As of the 2020 census, the population was 9,469. The county seat and the largest city is Cresco. The county was founded in 1851; it was named for General Tilghman Ashurst Howard, a Representative of Indiana.

== Geography ==
According to the U.S. Census Bureau, the county has a total area of 474 square miles (1,230 km^{2}), of which 473 square miles (1,230 km^{2}) is land and 0.4 square miles (1.0 km^{2}) (0.08%) is water.

=== Major highways ===
- U.S. Highway 63
- Iowa Highway 9
- Iowa Highway 139

=== Adjacent counties ===
- Mower County, Minnesota (northwest)
- Fillmore County, Minnesota (north)
- Winneshiek County (east)
- Chickasaw County (south)
- Mitchell County (west)
- Floyd County (southwest)

== Demographics ==
Historical population
Census	Pop.	Note	%±
1860	3,168		—
1870	6,282		98.3%
1880	10,837		72.5%
1890	11,182		3.2%
1900	14,512		29.8%
1910	12,920		−11.0%
1920	13,705		6.1%
1930	13,082		−4.5%
1940	13,531		3.4%
1950	13,105		−3.1%
1960	12,734		−2.8%
1970	11,442		−10.1%
1980	11,114		−2.9%
1990	9,809		−11.7%
2000	9,932		1.3%
2010	9,566		−3.7%
2020	9,469		−1.0%
2025 (est.)	9,415	▼	−0.6%
U.S. Decennial Census; 1790–1960 1900–1990; 1990–2000 2010–2020

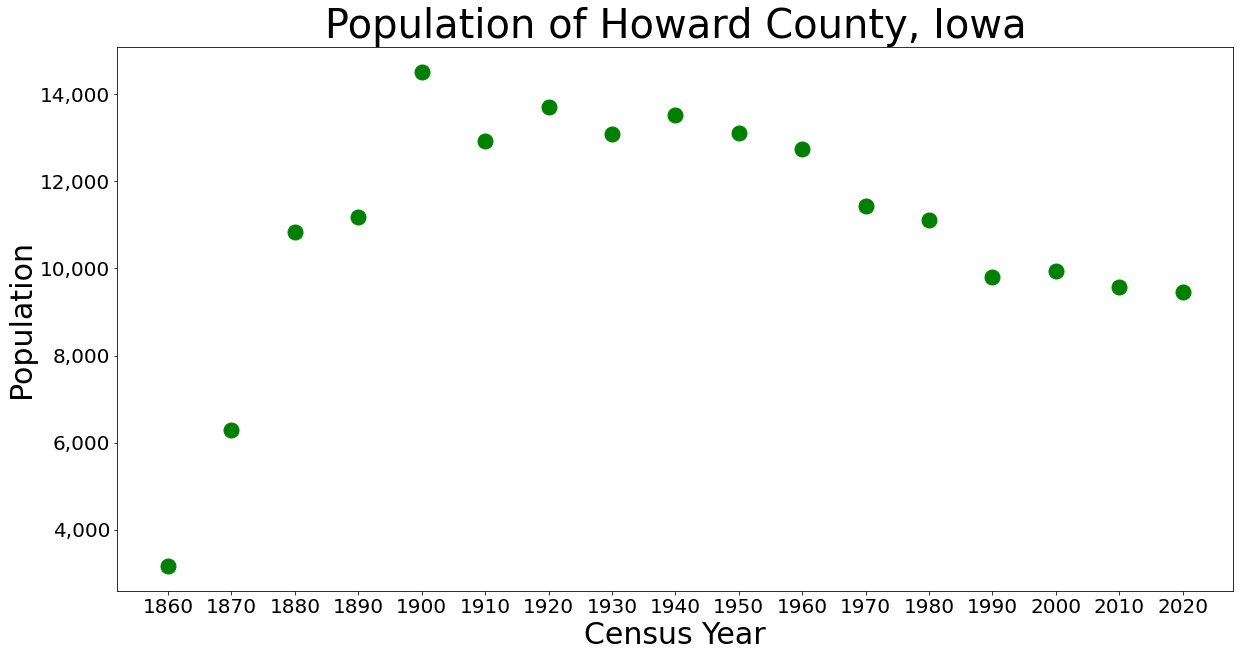
Population of Howard County from US census data

=== 2020 census ===
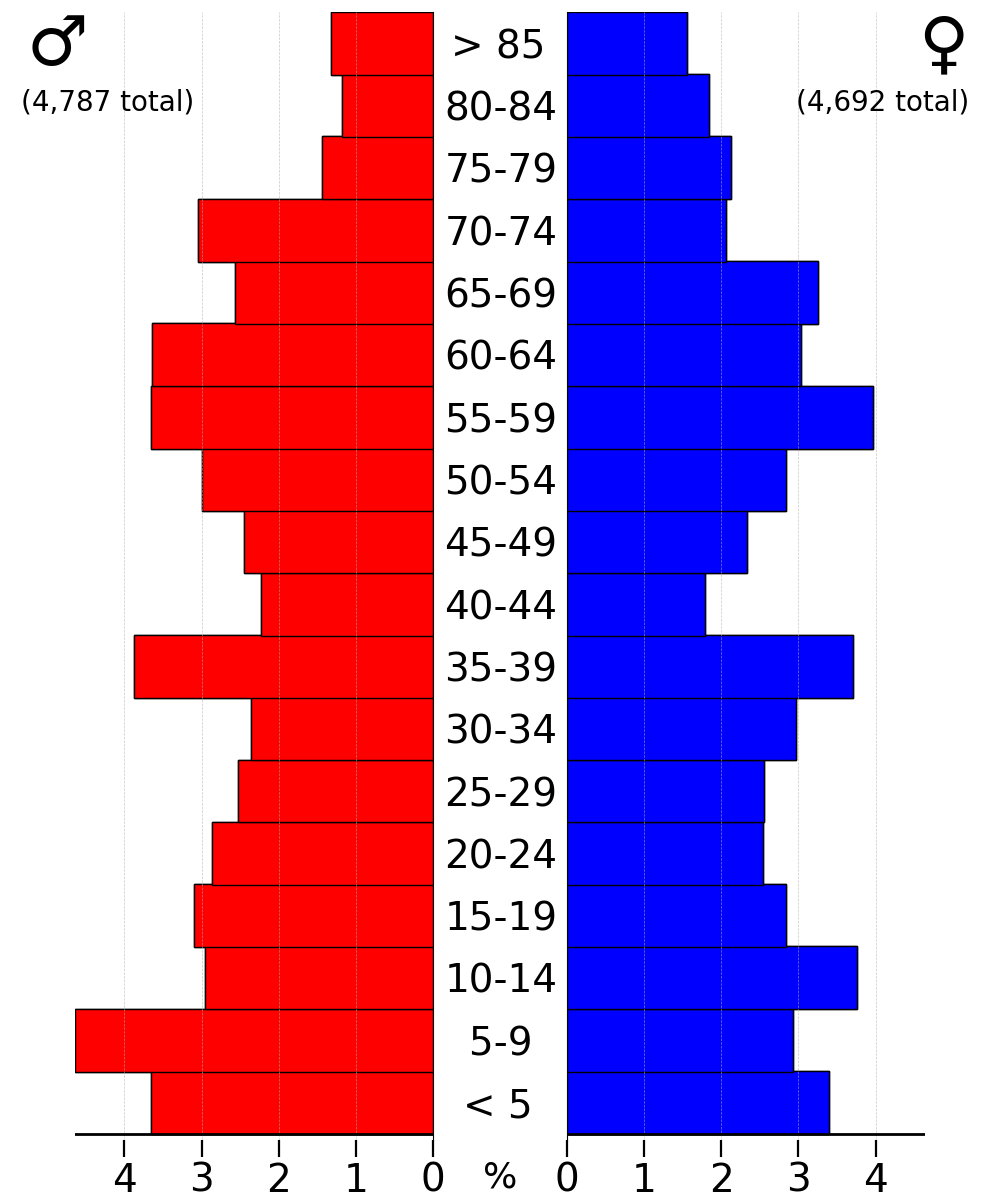
2022 US Census population pyramid for Howard County from ACS 5-year estimates

As of the 2020 census, the county had a population of 9,469, with a population density of 19.9/sq mi (7.7/km^{2}). The median age was 41.7 years, 25.1% of residents were under the age of 18, and 21.3% of residents were 65 years of age or older. For every 100 females there were 103.6 males, and for every 100 females age 18 and over there were 102.9 males age 18 and over. 96.75% of the population reported being of one race.

The racial makeup of the county was 94.4% White, 0.2% Black or African American, 0.5% American Indian and Alaska Native, 0.3% Asian, 0.1% Native Hawaiian and Pacific Islander, 1.2% from some other race, and 3.3% from two or more races. Hispanic or Latino residents of any race comprised 2.7% of the population.

<0.1% of residents lived in urban areas, while 100.0% lived in rural areas.

There were 3,945 households in the county, of which 27.4% had children under the age of 18 living in them. Of all households, 50.7% were married-couple households, 21.1% were households with a male householder and no spouse or partner present, and 21.4% were households with a female householder and no spouse or partner present. About 33.0% of all households were made up of individuals and 15.6% had someone living alone who was 65 years of age or older.

Of the 4,314 housing units, 3,945 were occupied, leaving 8.6% vacant. Among occupied housing units, 78.0% were owner-occupied and 22.0% were renter-occupied. The homeowner vacancy rate was 1.7% and the rental vacancy rate was 8.3%.

=== 2010 census ===
The 2010 census recorded a population of 9,566 in the county, with a population density of 20.2/sq mi (7.8/km^{2}). There were 4,367 housing units, of which 3,944 were occupied.

=== 2000 census ===
At the 2000 census, there were 9,932 people, 3,974 households and 2,650 families residing in the county. The population density was 21 per square mile (8.1/km^{2}). There were 4,327 housing units at an average density of 9 per square mile (3.5/km^{2}). The racial makeup of the county was 99.06% White, 0.11% Black or African American, 0.15% Native American, 0.17% Asian, 0.08% from other races, and 0.42% from two or more races. 0.55% of the population were Hispanic or Latino of any race.

There were 3,974 households, of which 31.1% had children under the age of 18 living with them, 56.8% were married couples living together, 6.6% had a female householder with no husband present, and 33.3% were non-families. 29.5% of all households were made up of individuals, and 15.6% had someone living alone who was 65 years of age or older. The average household size was 2.43 and the average family size was 3.03.

26.30% of the population were under the age of 18, 6.8% from 18 to 24, 25.4% from 25 to 44, 21.3% from 45 to 64, and 20.1% who were 65 years of age or older. The median age was 40 years. For every 100 females there were 97.0 males. For every 100 females age 18 and over, there were 96.3 males.

The median household income was $34,641 and the median family income was $43,284. Males had a median income of $28,856 compared $21,367 for females. The per capita income for the county was $17,842. About 5.6% of families and 9.3% of the population were below the poverty line, including 8.7% of those under age 18 and 8.8% of those age 65 or over.

== Events ==
The Mighty Howard County Fair is held annually in Cresco, in the last full week of June. This celebration originated in 1858, and three fairs were celebrated before being interrupted by the American Civil War. They resumed from 1866 through 1899, and were resumed in 1923 under aegis of the present directorship.

== Communities ==
=== Cities ===
- Chester
- Cresco
- Elma
- Lime Springs
- Protivin
- Riceville

=== Unincorporated communities ===
- Bonaire
- Florenceville
- Saratoga
- Schley

=== Townships ===
- Afton
- Albion
- Chester
- Forest City
- Howard
- Howard Center
- Jamestown
- New Oregon
- Oak Dale
- Paris
- Saratoga
- Vernon Springs

=== Population ranking ===
The population ranking of the following table is based on the 2020 census of Howard County.

† county seat

Rank	City/Town/etc.	Municipal type	Population (2020 Census)
1	† Cresco	City	3,888
2	Riceville (partially in Mitchell County)	City	806
3	Elma	City	505
4	Lime Springs	City	473
5	Protivin (partially in Chickasaw County)	City	269
6	Chester	City	139

== Notable people ==
- Norman Borlaug (1914–2009) - Nobel Peace Prize winner who was raised and went to school in the county.

== Politics ==
From 1972 to 2012, Howard County leaned Democratic in presidential elections. Republicans only carried the county three times, all amidst national landslides, and the county almost always weighed in to the left of the national popular vote. However, in 2016, the county swung dramatically towards Republican Donald Trump, going from a 21-point Democratic margin in 2012 to a more than 20-point Republican margin in 2016. With this 41-point swing, Howard County voted Republican in a presidential election for the first time since 1984, with Trump's 57.27% vote share marking the strongest Republican performance in the county since 1952. In 2020, Trump further expanded his vote share to 63.07%, the best performance for any candidate in Howard County since Warren G. Harding a century earlier. Trump improved yet again in 2024, taking more than 65% of the vote in the county. Overall, Howard County shifted to the right from 2012 to 2024 by 53 percentage points, representing one of the strongest such rightward shifts for any county in the country.

United States presidential election results for Howard County, Iowa
Year	Republican		Democratic		Third party(ies)	
Year	No.	%	No.	%	No.	%
1864	419	65.57%	220	34.43%	0	0.00%
1868	674	63.95%	380	36.05%	0	0.00%
1872	772	73.80%	130	12.43%	144	13.77%
1876	1,194	65.79%	600	33.06%	21	1.16%
1880	1,066	52.67%	285	14.08%	673	33.25%
1896	1,929	55.24%	1,507	43.16%	56	1.60%
1900	1,944	56.30%	1,420	41.12%	89	2.58%
1904	1,823	59.93%	1,096	36.03%	123	4.04%
1908	1,530	50.10%	1,408	46.10%	116	3.80%
1912	750	23.92%	1,416	45.17%	969	30.91%
1916	1,562	48.86%	1,560	48.80%	75	2.35%
1920	3,601	66.46%	1,717	31.69%	100	1.85%
1924	2,850	47.67%	1,604	26.83%	1,525	25.51%
1928	3,375	51.18%	3,193	48.42%	26	0.39%
1932	2,426	36.44%	4,176	62.72%	56	0.84%
1936	2,947	41.52%	3,861	54.40%	290	4.09%
1940	3,714	50.16%	3,675	49.63%	16	0.22%
1944	2,961	48.43%	3,132	51.23%	21	0.34%
1948	2,630	43.19%	3,378	55.47%	82	1.35%
1952	4,305	62.56%	2,564	37.26%	12	0.17%
1956	3,491	52.85%	3,106	47.02%	8	0.12%
1960	3,378	49.79%	3,406	50.21%	0	0.00%
1964	2,360	38.00%	3,841	61.84%	10	0.16%
1968	3,141	53.90%	2,420	41.53%	266	4.56%
1972	2,980	54.37%	2,439	44.50%	62	1.13%
1976	2,618	46.62%	2,917	51.94%	81	1.44%
1980	2,975	53.35%	2,214	39.71%	387	6.94%
1984	2,718	55.49%	2,135	43.59%	45	0.92%
1988	1,970	45.55%	2,330	53.87%	25	0.58%
1992	1,516	31.18%	2,099	43.17%	1,247	25.65%
1996	1,528	34.69%	2,303	52.28%	574	13.03%
2000	1,922	42.80%	2,426	54.02%	143	3.18%
2004	2,028	43.18%	2,614	55.65%	55	1.17%
2008	1,722	36.41%	2,941	62.19%	66	1.40%
2012	1,795	38.64%	2,768	59.59%	82	1.77%
2016	2,611	57.27%	1,677	36.78%	271	5.94%
2020	3,127	63.07%	1,772	35.74%	59	1.19%
2024	3,157	65.09%	1,619	33.38%	74	1.53%

== See also ==
- National Register of Historic Places listings in Howard County, Iowa
