= Howard Township, Howard County, Iowa =

Township in Howard County, Iowa, U.S.

Coordinates: 43°17′N 92°23′W

Howard Township is a township in Howard County, Iowa, USA.
