= Afton Township, Howard County, Iowa =

Township in Howard County, Iowa

Afton Township
- Township
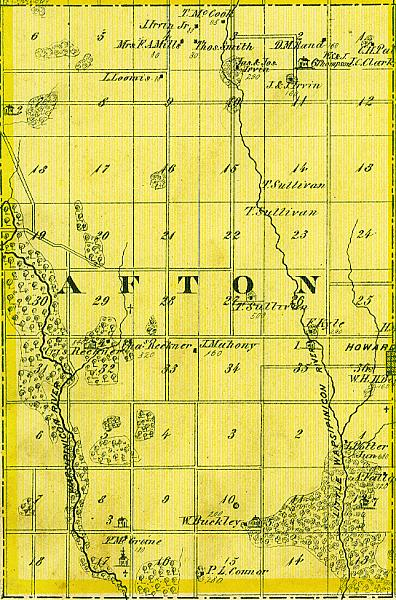
- Map of Afton Township

- Afton Township (Highlighted in red) compared to the rest of Howard County
- Coordinates: 43°15′48″N 92°29′59″W
- Country: United States
- State: Iowa
- County: Howard

Area
  - Total: 50.49 sq mi (130.76 km^{2})
- Elevation: 1,237 ft (377 m)

Population (2010)
  - Total: 897
- Time zone: UTC-6 (Central (CST))
  - Summer (DST): UTC-5 (CDT)
- ZIP code: 50466, 50603, 50628
- Area code: 641
- FIPS code: 19-089

Afton Township is a township in Howard County, Iowa, United States. As of 2010 Census it had a population of 897.
