= Chester Township, Howard County, Iowa =

Township in Howard County, Iowa, United States

Coordinates: 43°28′N 92°23′W

Chester Township is a township in Howard County, Iowa, United States.
