= Howard County Courthouse (Iowa) =

- U.S. National Register of Historic Places
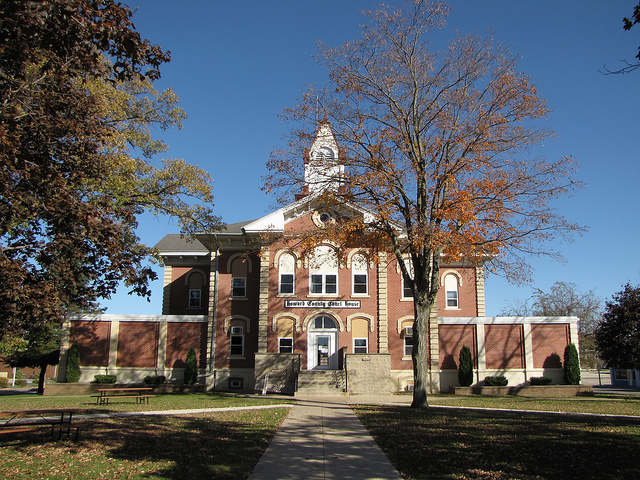

- Location within Iowa Location within the United States
- Interactive map showing the location for Howard County Courthouse
- Location: Elm St. Cresco, Iowa
- Coordinates: 43°22′26″N 92°7′3″W
- Area: less than one acre
- Built: 1879-1880
- Architect: B.D. Everingham; J.L. Harlow
- Architectural style: Italianate
- MPS: County Courthouses in Iowa TR
- NRHP reference No.: 81000246
- Added to NRHP: July 2, 1981

The Howard County Courthouse in Cresco, Iowa, United States was built in 1880. It was listed on the National Register of Historic Places in 1981 as a part of the County Courthouses in Iowa Thematic Resource. The courthouse is the third building the county has used for court functions and county administration.

== History ==
When Howard County was organized in 1855 the county judge named Vernon Springs as the county seat. Later in the year he ordered that the court and all county records be moved to Howard Center. New Oregon wanted the county seat there, but Pikes Peak was chosen by a committee instead. A courthouse was built there in 1859. As the county grew a new courthouse was needed and Cresco made a bid to build it in their town. The county board of supervisors accepted the bid and a courthouse was built there in 1876. It was destroyed in a fire and the present courthouse was begun in 1879 and completed a year later.

== Architecture ==
The Italianate structure was built of red and buff-colored bricks. Two additions were made to the building in 1964. Even though these additions mar it a bit, this is one of the last remaining courthouses in Iowa utilizing the Italianate style. The significance of the courthouse is derived from its association with county government, and the political power and prestige of Cresco as the county seat.
