= 1984 United States presidential election in Iowa =

- November 6, 1984

Nominee	Ronald Reagan	Walter Mondale
Party	Republican	Democratic
Home state	California	Minnesota
Running mate	George H. W. Bush	Geraldine Ferraro
Electoral vote	8	0
Popular vote	703,088	605,620
Percentage	53.27%	45.89%
County results
Reagan
40–50%
50–60%
60–70%
70–80%
80–90%
Mondale
50–60%
President before election
Ronald Reagan
Republican
Elected President
Ronald Reagan
Republican

The 1984 United States presidential election in Iowa took place on November 6, 1984. All 50 states and the District of Columbia, were part of the 1984 United States presidential election. Voters chose eight electors to the Electoral College, which selected the president and vice president of the United States. Iowa was won by incumbent United States President Ronald Reagan of California, who was running against former Vice President Walter Mondale of Minnesota. While the majority of counties turned out for Reagan, the politically volatile state of Iowa was a relatively narrow victory for him, thanks in part to the Midwest Farm Crisis of the early 1980s. The relatively weak Republican trend for this election is highlighted by the loss of Des Moines's highly populated Polk County to Mondale.

Iowa weighed in for this election as 11 points more Democratic than the national average. As of the 2024 presidential election, this is the last election in which Black Hawk County (Waterloo), Linn County (Cedar Rapids), and Story County (Ames) voted for a Republican presidential candidate. Iowa would not vote Republican again until 2004.

== Campaign ==
A Democratic Party presidential debate was held in Des Moines on February 11, 1984, with Walter Mondale, George McGovern, Gary Hart, John Glenn, Alan Cranston, Fritz Hollings and Reubin Askew participating.

Governor Terry Branstad was the chair of Reagan's campaign in Iowa.

Michael Triggs, Monty Bertelli, Herbert Blume, Richard Johnson, Larry Allen, Claudine Mansfield, Margaret Severino, and Grace Copley served as presidential electors for Reagan.

== Results ==
1984 United States presidential election in Iowa
Party	Candidate	Votes	Percentage	Electoral votes
Republican	Ronald Reagan (incumbent)	703,088	53.27%	8
Democratic	Walter Mondale	605,620	45.89%	0
“Nominated By Petition”	Lyndon LaRouche	6,248	0.47%	0
Libertarian	David Bergland	1,844	0.14%	0
Write-Ins		1,051	0.08%	0
Independent	Gerald Baker	892	0.07%	0
New Alliance Party	Dennis Serrette	463	0.04%	0
Socialist Workers Party	Melvin Mason	313	0.02%	0
Communist Party	Gus Hall	286	0.02%	0
Totals		1,319,805	100.0%	8

=== Results by county ===
County	Ronald Reagan Republican		Walter Mondale Democratic		Lyndon LaRouche Nominated By Petition		David Bergland Libertarian		Various candidates Other parties		Margin		Total votes cast
County	#	%	#	%	#	%	#	%	#	%	#	%	Total votes cast
Adair	2,615	56.61%	1,979	42.84%	8	0.17%	6	0.13%	11	0.24%	636	13.77%	4,619
Adams	1,706	57.64%	1,221	41.25%	19	0.64%	10	0.34%	4	0.14%	485	16.39%	2,960
Allamakee	3,997	62.91%	2,282	35.91%	51	0.80%	3	0.05%	21	0.33%	1,715	27.00%	6,354
Appanoose	3,412	50.48%	3,289	48.66%	37	0.55%	6	0.09%	15	0.22%	123	1.82%	6,759
Audubon	2,306	54.97%	1,854	44.20%	26	0.62%	4	0.10%	5	0.12%	452	10.77%	4,195
Benton	5,566	52.13%	4,993	46.76%	82	0.77%	11	0.10%	26	0.24%	573	5.37%	10,678
Black Hawk	32,262	50.23%	31,467	48.99%	282	0.44%	74	0.12%	148	0.23%	795	1.24%	64,233
Boone	5,746	46.80%	6,485	52.82%	22	0.18%	4	0.03%	20	0.16%	-739	-6.02%	12,277
Bremer	6,895	62.37%	4,084	36.94%	44	0.40%	13	0.12%	19	0.17%	2,811	25.43%	11,055
Buchanan	4,965	54.25%	4,129	45.12%	25	0.27%	12	0.13%	21	0.23%	836	9.13%	9,152
Buena Vista	5,193	55.22%	4,109	43.69%	43	0.46%	33	0.35%	27	0.29%	1,084	11.53%	9,405
Butler	4,570	66.00%	2,323	33.55%	21	0.30%	3	0.04%	7	0.10%	2,247	32.45%	6,924
Calhoun	3,311	56.14%	2,541	43.08%	31	0.53%	9	0.15%	6	0.10%	770	13.06%	5,898
Carroll	5,021	49.83%	4,960	49.22%	65	0.65%	9	0.09%	22	0.22%	61	0.61%	10,077
Cass	5,053	67.10%	2,417	32.09%	35	0.46%	12	0.16%	14	0.19%	2,636	35.01%	7,531
Cedar	4,617	59.59%	3,086	39.83%	21	0.27%	16	0.21%	8	0.10%	1,531	19.76%	7,748
Cerro Gordo	11,214	48.86%	11,570	50.41%	118	0.51%	18	0.08%	30	0.13%	-356	-1.55%	22,950
Cherokee	4,046	54.16%	3,349	44.83%	46	0.62%	6	0.08%	23	0.31%	697	9.33%	7,470
Chickasaw	3,661	52.93%	3,186	46.06%	48	0.69%	6	0.09%	16	0.23%	475	6.87%	6,917
Clarke	2,262	52.35%	2,030	46.98%	12	0.28%	10	0.23%	7	0.16%	232	5.37%	4,321
Clay	4,450	53.51%	3,774	45.38%	57	0.69%	9	0.11%	26	0.31%	676	8.13%	8,316
Clayton	5,029	58.80%	3,446	40.29%	54	0.63%	8	0.09%	16	0.19%	1,583	18.51%	8,553
Clinton	13,914	54.77%	11,240	44.25%	150	0.59%	33	0.13%	67	0.26%	2,674	10.52%	25,404
Crawford	4,552	56.53%	3,396	42.17%	82	1.02%	9	0.11%	14	0.17%	1,156	14.36%	8,053
Dallas	6,080	47.85%	6,564	51.66%	17	0.13%	15	0.12%	31	0.24%	-484	-3.81%	12,707
Davis	1,956	46.77%	2,187	52.30%	19	0.45%	2	0.05%	18	0.43%	-231	-5.53%	4,182
Decatur	2,104	49.60%	2,098	49.46%	15	0.35%	4	0.09%	21	0.50%	6	0.14%	4,242
Delaware	4,769	59.61%	3,158	39.47%	45	0.56%	4	0.05%	25	0.31%	1,611	20.14%	8,001
Des Moines	9,559	45.85%	11,173	53.59%	53	0.25%	29	0.14%	36	0.17%	-1,614	-7.74%	20,850
Dickinson	4,064	56.68%	3,025	42.19%	58	0.81%	9	0.13%	14	0.20%	1,039	14.49%	7,170
Dubuque	19,239	46.37%	21,876	52.72%	234	0.56%	50	0.12%	92	0.22%	-2,637	-6.35%	41,491
Emmet	2,946	51.46%	2,746	47.97%	26	0.45%	4	0.07%	3	0.05%	200	3.49%	5,725
Fayette	6,505	57.56%	4,677	41.38%	69	0.61%	16	0.14%	35	0.31%	1,828	16.18%	11,302
Floyd	4,341	50.75%	4,154	48.57%	39	0.46%	7	0.08%	12	0.14%	187	2.18%	8,553
Franklin	3,129	56.43%	2,349	42.36%	48	0.87%	3	0.05%	16	0.29%	780	14.07%	5,545
Fremont	2,686	64.77%	1,426	34.39%	25	0.60%	3	0.07%	7	0.17%	1,260	30.38%	4,147
Greene	2,579	46.44%	2,831	50.97%	118	2.12%	13	0.23%	13	0.23%	-252	-4.53%	5,554
Grundy	4,527	69.45%	1,915	29.38%	55	0.84%	7	0.11%	14	0.21%	2,612	40.07%	6,518
Guthrie	2,783	51.89%	2,517	46.93%	44	0.82%	6	0.11%	13	0.24%	266	4.96%	5,363
Hamilton	4,279	55.61%	3,330	43.27%	42	0.55%	15	0.19%	29	0.38%	949	12.34%	7,695
Hancock	3,362	56.62%	2,539	42.76%	22	0.37%	5	0.08%	10	0.17%	823	13.86%	5,938
Hardin	5,195	53.38%	4,477	46.00%	29	0.30%	11	0.11%	20	0.21%	718	7.38%	9,732
Harrison	4,352	63.24%	2,495	36.25%	21	0.31%	2	0.03%	12	0.17%	1,857	26.99%	6,882
Henry	4,516	56.77%	3,377	42.45%	27	0.34%	15	0.19%	20	0.25%	1,139	14.32%	7,955
Howard	2,718	55.49%	2,135	43.59%	19	0.39%	6	0.12%	20	0.41%	583	11.90%	4,898
Humboldt	3,396	57.92%	2,406	41.04%	45	0.77%	6	0.10%	10	0.17%	990	16.88%	5,863
Ida	2,618	62.30%	1,559	37.10%	18	0.43%	2	0.05%	5	0.12%	1,059	25.20%	4,202
Iowa	4,352	60.02%	2,815	38.82%	63	0.87%	7	0.10%	14	0.19%	1,537	21.20%	7,251
Jackson	4,811	51.51%	4,400	47.11%	81	0.87%	19	0.20%	29	0.31%	411	4.40%	9,340
Jasper	8,576	51.36%	8,023	48.04%	50	0.30%	20	0.12%	30	0.18%	553	3.32%	16,699
Jefferson	4,727	61.19%	2,961	38.33%	9	0.12%	13	0.17%	15	0.19%	1,766	22.86%	7,725
Johnson	18,677	41.46%	26,000	57.72%	54	0.12%	127	0.28%	186	0.41%	-7,323	-16.26%	45,044
Jones	4,907	55.82%	3,825	43.51%	27	0.31%	12	0.14%	20	0.23%	1,082	12.31%	8,791
Keokuk	2,913	51.50%	2,649	46.84%	64	1.13%	2	0.04%	28	0.50%	264	4.66%	5,656
Kossuth	4,872	49.64%	4,838	49.30%	78	0.79%	10	0.10%	16	0.16%	34	0.34%	9,814
Lee	8,756	49.17%	8,912	50.04%	74	0.42%	29	0.16%	38	0.21%	-156	-0.87%	17,809
Linn	41,061	51.12%	38,528	47.97%	172	0.21%	173	0.22%	381	0.47%	2,533	3.15%	80,315
Louisa	2,623	57.36%	1,927	42.14%	10	0.22%	4	0.09%	9	0.20%	696	15.22%	4,573
Lucas	2,630	51.72%	2,422	47.63%	16	0.31%	5	0.10%	12	0.24%	208	4.09%	5,085
Lyon	4,178	74.05%	1,401	24.83%	49	0.87%	8	0.14%	6	0.11%	2,777	49.22%	5,642
Madison	3,168	50.60%	3,067	48.99%	9	0.14%	6	0.10%	11	0.18%	101	1.61%	6,261
Mahaska	6,086	59.13%	4,107	39.90%	65	0.63%	9	0.09%	26	0.25%	1,979	19.23%	10,293
Marion	7,259	53.24%	6,313	46.30%	40	0.29%	12	0.09%	10	0.07%	946	6.94%	13,634
Marshall	10,839	54.63%	8,809	44.40%	123	0.62%	26	0.13%	43	0.22%	2,030	10.23%	19,840
Mills	3,994	72.80%	1,434	26.14%	29	0.53%	11	0.20%	18	0.33%	2,560	46.66%	5,486
Mitchell	3,144	54.74%	2,531	44.07%	45	0.78%	9	0.16%	14	0.24%	613	10.67%	5,743
Monona	2,746	55.37%	2,159	43.54%	41	0.83%	4	0.08%	9	0.18%	587	11.83%	4,959
Monroe	1,927	44.91%	2,342	54.58%	7	0.16%	3	0.07%	12	0.28%	-415	-9.67%	4,291
Montgomery	4,224	71.23%	1,661	28.01%	27	0.46%	8	0.13%	10	0.17%	2,563	43.22%	5,930
Muscatine	9,069	59.79%	5,986	39.46%	75	0.49%	16	0.11%	22	0.15%	3,083	20.33%	15,168
O'Brien	5,008	66.16%	2,479	32.75%	59	0.78%	12	0.16%	11	0.15%	2,529	33.41%	7,569
Osceola	2,285	65.98%	1,146	33.09%	28	0.81%	1	0.03%	3	0.09%	1,139	32.89%	3,463
Page	5,876	75.06%	1,914	24.45%	24	0.31%	6	0.08%	8	0.10%	3,962	50.61%	7,828
Palo Alto	2,715	46.73%	3,018	51.94%	71	1.22%	1	0.02%	5	0.09%	-303	-5.21%	5,810
Plymouth	6,482	64.65%	3,464	34.55%	54	0.54%	13	0.13%	14	0.14%	3,018	30.10%	10,027
Pocahontas	2,627	50.64%	2,481	47.82%	24	0.46%	41	0.79%	15	0.29%	146	2.82%	5,188
Polk	71,413	48.30%	75,413	51.01%	540	0.37%	244	0.17%	238	0.16%	-4,000	-2.71%	147,848
Pottawattamie	21,527	63.11%	12,329	36.14%	179	0.52%	33	0.10%	44	0.13%	9,198	26.97%	34,112
Poweshiek	4,715	53.04%	4,103	46.16%	38	0.43%	7	0.08%	26	0.29%	612	6.88%	8,889
Ringgold	1,512	48.51%	1,593	51.11%	10	0.32%	2	0.06%	0	0.00%	-81	-2.60%	3,117
Sac	3,298	57.57%	2,363	41.25%	41	0.72%	9	0.16%	18	0.31%	935	16.32%	5,729
Scott	38,034	53.41%	32,550	45.71%	385	0.54%	122	0.17%	121	0.17%	5,484	7.70%	71,212
Shelby	4,200	64.25%	2,291	35.05%	31	0.47%	7	0.11%	8	0.12%	1,909	29.20%	6,537
Sioux	11,665	81.61%	2,585	18.09%	25	0.17%	5	0.03%	13	0.09%	9,080	63.52%	14,293
Story	19,804	51.56%	18,277	47.58%	107	0.28%	94	0.24%	128	0.33%	1,527	3.98%	38,410
Tama	4,882	54.30%	4,061	45.17%	25	0.28%	6	0.07%	16	0.18%	821	9.13%	8,990
Taylor	2,496	62.06%	1,499	37.27%	13	0.32%	3	0.07%	11	0.27%	997	24.79%	4,022
Union	3,583	54.49%	2,875	43.72%	34	0.52%	12	0.18%	72	1.09%	708	10.77%	6,576
Van Buren	2,138	56.73%	1,606	42.61%	19	0.50%	1	0.03%	5	0.13%	532	14.12%	3,769
Wapello	7,098	39.88%	10,545	59.24%	86	0.48%	31	0.17%	40	0.22%	-3,447	-19.36%	17,800
Warren	8,277	49.95%	8,171	49.31%	84	0.51%	13	0.08%	25	0.15%	106	0.64%	16,570
Washington	4,613	59.37%	3,079	39.63%	46	0.59%	14	0.18%	18	0.23%	1,534	19.74%	7,770
Wayne	2,061	51.26%	1,927	47.92%	14	0.35%	8	0.20%	11	0.27%	134	3.34%	4,021
Webster	9,619	48.58%	9,930	50.15%	206	1.04%	25	0.13%	22	0.11%	-311	-1.57%	19,802
Winnebago	3,616	57.27%	2,669	42.27%	16	0.25%	2	0.03%	11	0.17%	947	15.00%	6,314
Winneshiek	5,277	57.96%	3,724	40.90%	78	0.86%	7	0.08%	19	0.21%	1,553	17.06%	9,105
Woodbury	23,002	54.31%	18,951	44.75%	296	0.70%	42	0.10%	59	0.14%	4,051	9.56%	42,350
Worth	1,985	46.53%	2,263	53.05%	9	0.21%	5	0.12%	4	0.09%	-278	-6.52%	4,266
Wright	3,675	54.81%	2,980	44.44%	31	0.46%	9	0.13%	10	0.15%	695	10.37%	6,705
Totals	703,088	53.27%	605,620	45.89%	6,248	0.47%	1,844	0.14%	3,005	0.23%	97,468	7.38%	1,319,805

=== Results by congressional district ===
Reagan carried 5 of 6 congressional districts, including one held by Democrats.

District	Reagan	Mondale
1st	52.2%	47%
2nd	52.6%	46.4%
3rd	51.7%	47.4%
4th	49.9%	50.1%
5th	57.4%	41.8%
6th	57.1%	42%

== See also ==
- United States presidential elections in Iowa
- Presidency of Ronald Reagan

== Works cited ==
- Triggs, Michael, ed. (1986). 1985-86 Iowa Official Register (PDF). Secretary of State of Iowa.
