= New Oregon Township, Howard County, Iowa =

Township in Howard County, Iowa, U.S.

Coordinates: 43°17′N 92°08′W

New Oregon Township is a township in Howard County, Iowa, United States.
