= 1976 United States presidential election in Iowa =

- November 2, 1976

Nominee	Gerald Ford	Jimmy Carter
Party	Republican	Democratic
Home state	Michigan	Georgia
Running mate	Bob Dole	Walter Mondale
Electoral vote	8	0
Popular vote	632,863	619,931
Percentage	49.47%	48.46%

Ford
40–50%
50–60%
60–70%
70–80%
Carter
40–50%
50–60%
President before election
Gerald Ford
Republican
Elected President
Jimmy Carter
Democratic

The 1976 United States presidential election in Iowa took place on November 2, 1976, as part of the 1976 United States presidential election. Voters chose eight representatives, or electors, to the Electoral College, who voted for president and vice president.

Iowa was won by incumbent President Gerald Ford (R–Michigan). with 49.47 percent of the popular vote, against Jimmy Carter (D–Georgia), with 48.46 percent, making Iowa about 3% more Republican than the nation-at-large. This race was one of the tightest in the nation, with the two candidates being separated by just 1.01 percent and a mere thirteen thousand votes. None of the third-party candidates amounted to a significant portion of the vote, but Eugene McCarthy (NBP–Minnesota) won 1.57 percent of the popular vote and came third overall in the nation.

Despite losing in Iowa, Carter went on to win the national election and became the 39th president of the United States. This was the last time until 2020 that a Democrat was elected President without carrying the state of Iowa.

== Results ==
1976 United States presidential election in Iowa
Party	Candidate	Votes	%
Republican	Gerald Ford (inc.)	632,863	49.47%
Democratic	Jimmy Carter	619,931	48.46%
Nominated By Petition	Eugene McCarthy	20,051	1.57%
American	Thomas J. Anderson	3,040	0.24%
Libertarian	Roger MacBride	1,452	0.11%
Communist	Gus Hall	554	0.04%
Write-ins	—	506	0.04%
Socialist Workers	Peter Camejo	267	0.02%
U.S. Labor	Lyndon LaRouche	241	0.02%
Socialist	Frank Zeidler	234	0.02%
Socialist Labor	Julius Levin	167	0.01%
Total votes		1,279,306	100%

=== Results by county ===
County	Gerald Ford Republican		Jimmy Carter Democratic		Eugene McCarthy Nominated By Petition		Thomas Anderson American		Various candidates Other parties		Margin		Total votes cast
County	#	%	#	%	#	%	#	%	#	%	#	%	Total votes cast
Adair	2,326	49.26%	2,294	48.58%	65	1.38%	20	0.42%	17	0.36%	32	0.68%	4,722
Adams	1,388	47.26%	1,507	51.31%	27	0.92%	7	0.24%	8	0.27%	-119	-4.05%	2,937
Allamakee	3,648	57.88%	2,568	40.74%	67	1.06%	2	0.03%	18	0.29%	1,080	17.14%	6,303
Appanoose	3,036	46.29%	3,424	52.21%	63	0.96%	10	0.15%	25	0.38%	-388	-5.92%	6,558
Audubon	1,978	47.86%	2,104	50.91%	34	0.82%	9	0.22%	8	0.19%	-126	-3.05%	4,133
Benton	5,014	46.85%	5,514	51.52%	137	1.28%	18	0.17%	20	0.19%	-500	-4.67%	10,703
Black Hawk	30,994	50.23%	29,508	47.82%	918	1.49%	92	0.15%	193	0.31%	1,486	2.41%	61,705
Boone	5,413	44.14%	6,595	53.78%	187	1.52%	44	0.36%	24	0.20%	-1,182	-9.64%	12,263
Bremer	6,252	58.51%	4,203	39.34%	176	1.65%	14	0.13%	40	0.37%	2,049	19.17%	10,685
Buchanan	4,794	51.98%	4,258	46.17%	127	1.38%	8	0.09%	36	0.39%	536	5.81%	9,223
Buena Vista	5,126	53.58%	4,227	44.18%	163	1.70%	15	0.16%	36	0.38%	899	9.40%	9,567
Butler	4,207	61.79%	2,503	36.77%	72	1.06%	17	0.25%	9	0.13%	1,704	25.02%	6,808
Calhoun	3,215	51.03%	3,001	47.63%	67	1.06%	3	0.05%	14	0.22%	214	3.40%	6,300
Carroll	4,094	42.61%	5,333	55.51%	143	1.49%	13	0.14%	25	0.26%	-1,239	-12.90%	9,608
Cass	4,589	60.79%	2,866	37.97%	70	0.93%	10	0.13%	14	0.19%	1,723	22.82%	7,549
Cedar	4,308	55.08%	3,354	42.88%	105	1.34%	35	0.45%	20	0.26%	954	12.20%	7,822
Cerro Gordo	10,604	47.77%	11,189	50.41%	322	1.45%	52	0.23%	29	0.13%	-585	-2.64%	22,196
Cherokee	3,993	53.40%	3,358	44.91%	97	1.30%	11	0.15%	19	0.25%	635	8.49%	7,478
Chickasaw	3,432	49.11%	3,503	50.13%	46	0.66%	5	0.07%	2	0.03%	-71	-1.02%	6,988
Clarke	1,737	41.87%	2,333	56.23%	43	1.04%	17	0.41%	19	0.46%	-596	-14.36%	4,149
Clay	4,548	53.51%	3,776	44.42%	102	1.20%	45	0.53%	29	0.34%	772	9.09%	8,500
Clayton	4,826	54.80%	3,804	43.19%	123	1.40%	20	0.23%	34	0.39%	1,022	11.61%	8,807
Clinton	12,401	50.55%	11,746	47.88%	285	1.16%	43	0.18%	58	0.24%	655	2.67%	24,533
Crawford	3,879	48.80%	3,903	49.11%	126	1.59%	18	0.23%	22	0.28%	-24	-0.31%	7,948
Dallas	5,308	43.34%	6,722	54.89%	166	1.36%	27	0.22%	24	0.20%	-1,414	-11.55%	12,247
Davis	1,631	39.50%	2,426	58.76%	51	1.24%	11	0.27%	10	0.24%	-795	-19.26%	4,129
Decatur	1,932	41.05%	2,698	57.32%	39	0.83%	21	0.45%	17	0.36%	-766	-16.27%	4,707
Delaware	4,161	55.62%	3,168	42.35%	117	1.56%	13	0.17%	22	0.29%	993	13.27%	7,481
Des Moines	9,023	43.94%	11,268	54.87%	173	0.84%	32	0.16%	40	0.19%	-2,245	-10.93%	20,536
Dickinson	3,795	54.14%	3,074	43.85%	108	1.54%	23	0.33%	10	0.14%	721	10.29%	7,010
Dubuque	17,459	44.71%	20,548	52.62%	863	2.21%	102	0.26%	77	0.20%	-3,089	-7.91%	39,049
Emmet	2,872	50.50%	2,720	47.83%	68	1.20%	9	0.16%	18	0.32%	152	2.67%	5,687
Fayette	6,618	54.69%	5,220	43.13%	180	1.49%	30	0.25%	54	0.45%	1,398	11.56%	12,102
Floyd	4,361	47.52%	4,646	50.62%	126	1.37%	32	0.35%	13	0.14%	-285	-3.10%	9,178
Franklin	3,056	52.30%	2,682	45.90%	78	1.33%	11	0.19%	16	0.27%	374	6.40%	5,843
Fremont	2,163	51.80%	1,964	47.03%	35	0.84%	10	0.24%	4	0.10%	199	4.77%	4,176
Greene	2,811	46.94%	3,094	51.66%	64	1.07%	9	0.15%	11	0.18%	-283	-4.72%	5,989
Grundy	4,173	62.66%	2,410	36.19%	59	0.89%	10	0.15%	8	0.12%	1,763	26.47%	6,660
Guthrie	2,644	46.87%	2,873	50.93%	92	1.63%	18	0.32%	14	0.25%	-229	-4.06%	5,641
Hamilton	3,932	49.00%	3,953	49.26%	105	1.31%	11	0.14%	24	0.30%	-21	-0.26%	8,025
Hancock	3,127	50.54%	2,975	48.08%	68	1.10%	11	0.18%	6	0.10%	152	2.46%	6,187
Hardin	4,682	50.19%	4,479	48.02%	128	1.37%	21	0.23%	18	0.19%	203	2.17%	9,328
Harrison	3,489	51.38%	3,228	47.54%	38	0.56%	12	0.18%	23	0.34%	261	3.84%	6,790
Henry	3,848	48.79%	3,882	49.22%	114	1.45%	25	0.32%	18	0.23%	-34	-0.43%	7,887
Howard	2,618	46.62%	2,917	51.94%	55	0.98%	14	0.25%	12	0.21%	-299	-5.32%	5,616
Humboldt	3,075	52.65%	2,677	45.83%	65	1.11%	10	0.17%	14	0.24%	398	6.82%	5,841
Ida	2,590	56.86%	1,868	41.01%	70	1.54%	13	0.29%	14	0.31%	722	15.85%	4,555
Iowa	3,926	52.98%	3,367	45.43%	81	1.09%	18	0.24%	19	0.26%	559	7.55%	7,411
Jackson	4,221	47.50%	4,467	50.27%	152	1.71%	14	0.16%	32	0.36%	-246	-2.77%	8,886
Jasper	7,728	46.04%	8,783	52.32%	226	1.35%	18	0.11%	31	0.19%	-1,055	-6.28%	16,786
Jefferson	3,746	51.71%	3,377	46.62%	73	1.01%	28	0.39%	20	0.28%	369	5.09%	7,244
Johnson	16,090	41.57%	20,208	52.20%	2,082	5.38%	43	0.11%	287	0.74%	-4,118	-10.63%	38,710
Jones	4,463	50.54%	4,245	48.07%	91	1.03%	20	0.23%	12	0.14%	218	2.47%	8,831
Keokuk	2,920	44.90%	3,482	53.54%	84	1.29%	10	0.15%	8	0.12%	-562	-8.64%	6,504
Kossuth	4,653	46.32%	5,190	51.66%	154	1.53%	28	0.28%	21	0.21%	-537	-5.34%	10,046
Lee	8,195	46.92%	9,017	51.63%	186	1.06%	34	0.19%	33	0.19%	-822	-4.71%	17,465
Linn	36,513	47.79%	38,252	50.07%	1,256	1.64%	128	0.17%	248	0.32%	-1,739	-2.28%	76,397
Louisa	2,284	51.43%	2,089	47.04%	47	1.06%	11	0.25%	10	0.23%	195	4.39%	4,441
Lucas	2,071	42.32%	2,733	55.84%	68	1.39%	12	0.25%	10	0.20%	-662	-13.52%	4,894
Lyon	3,558	64.06%	1,870	33.67%	56	1.01%	63	1.13%	7	0.13%	1,688	30.39%	5,554
Madison	2,681	45.36%	3,109	52.61%	83	1.40%	25	0.42%	12	0.20%	-428	-7.25%	5,910
Mahaska	5,267	51.38%	4,838	47.20%	109	1.06%	24	0.23%	13	0.13%	429	4.18%	10,251
Marion	5,429	45.79%	6,226	52.51%	149	1.26%	36	0.30%	17	0.14%	-797	-6.72%	11,857
Marshall	9,562	51.33%	8,695	46.67%	285	1.53%	49	0.26%	39	0.21%	867	4.66%	18,630
Mills	2,722	57.79%	1,908	40.51%	31	0.66%	44	0.93%	5	0.11%	814	17.28%	4,710
Mitchell	2,887	49.00%	2,906	49.32%	78	1.32%	8	0.14%	13	0.22%	-19	-0.32%	5,892
Monona	2,636	49.09%	2,661	49.55%	49	0.91%	11	0.20%	13	0.24%	-25	-0.46%	5,370
Monroe	1,581	39.56%	2,360	59.06%	35	0.88%	4	0.10%	16	0.40%	-779	-19.50%	3,996
Montgomery	3,673	61.48%	2,229	37.31%	37	0.62%	30	0.50%	5	0.08%	1,444	24.17%	5,974
Muscatine	7,697	53.10%	6,567	45.30%	183	1.26%	19	0.13%	30	0.21%	1,130	7.80%	14,496
O'Brien	4,643	61.86%	2,732	36.40%	82	1.09%	35	0.47%	14	0.19%	1,911	25.46%	7,506
Osceola	1,955	58.36%	1,309	39.07%	53	1.58%	15	0.45%	18	0.54%	646	19.29%	3,350
Page	5,343	64.10%	2,865	34.37%	66	0.79%	29	0.35%	32	0.38%	2,478	29.73%	8,335
Palo Alto	2,623	44.43%	3,182	53.90%	76	1.29%	18	0.30%	5	0.08%	-559	-9.47%	5,904
Plymouth	5,590	55.81%	4,284	42.77%	89	0.89%	33	0.33%	20	0.20%	1,306	13.04%	10,016
Pocahontas	2,700	45.85%	3,055	51.88%	96	1.63%	11	0.19%	27	0.46%	-355	-6.03%	5,889
Polk	62,316	45.23%	71,917	52.20%	2,822	2.05%	343	0.25%	365	0.26%	-9,601	-6.97%	137,763
Pottawattamie	17,264	53.09%	14,754	45.37%	291	0.89%	123	0.38%	87	0.27%	2,510	7.72%	32,519
Poweshiek	4,194	48.01%	4,360	49.91%	139	1.59%	13	0.15%	29	0.33%	-166	-1.90%	8,735
Ringgold	1,543	46.25%	1,739	52.13%	37	1.11%	6	0.18%	11	0.33%	-196	-5.88%	3,336
Sac	3,347	51.55%	2,996	46.14%	107	1.65%	14	0.22%	29	0.45%	351	5.41%	6,493
Scott	35,021	53.11%	29,771	45.15%	822	1.25%	147	0.22%	179	0.27%	5,250	7.96%	65,940
Shelby	3,301	52.72%	2,851	45.54%	76	1.21%	12	0.19%	21	0.34%	450	7.18%	6,261
Sioux	9,448	73.04%	3,322	25.68%	90	0.70%	57	0.44%	18	0.14%	6,126	47.36%	12,935
Story	18,394	51.85%	15,717	44.30%	1,153	3.25%	74	0.21%	138	0.39%	2,677	7.55%	35,476
Tama	4,379	48.08%	4,580	50.29%	108	1.19%	21	0.23%	20	0.22%	-201	-2.21%	9,108
Taylor	2,059	50.42%	1,947	47.67%	31	0.76%	13	0.32%	34	0.83%	112	2.75%	4,084
Union	2,873	48.30%	2,955	49.68%	79	1.33%	31	0.52%	10	0.17%	-82	-1.38%	5,948
Van Buren	1,804	49.14%	1,807	49.22%	36	0.98%	13	0.35%	11	0.30%	-3	-0.08%	3,671
Wapello	6,786	39.30%	10,249	59.35%	152	0.88%	41	0.24%	40	0.23%	-3,463	-20.05%	17,268
Warren	6,099	43.23%	7,653	54.25%	272	1.93%	65	0.46%	19	0.13%	-1,554	-11.02%	14,108
Washington	4,218	54.03%	3,448	44.17%	91	1.17%	30	0.38%	20	0.26%	770	9.86%	7,807
Wayne	1,781	44.58%	2,145	53.69%	54	1.35%	9	0.23%	6	0.15%	-364	-9.11%	3,995
Webster	9,068	45.35%	10,543	52.73%	298	1.49%	35	0.18%	51	0.26%	-1,475	-7.38%	19,995
Winnebago	3,315	52.24%	2,950	46.49%	63	0.99%	14	0.22%	4	0.06%	365	5.75%	6,346
Winneshiek	4,765	52.08%	4,158	45.45%	162	1.77%	34	0.37%	30	0.33%	607	6.63%	9,149
Woodbury	22,853	52.79%	19,664	45.43%	555	1.28%	111	0.26%	104	0.24%	3,189	7.37%	43,287
Worth	1,964	44.38%	2,399	54.21%	51	1.15%	11	0.25%	0	0.00%	-435	-9.83%	4,425
Wright	3,544	48.67%	3,637	49.95%	78	1.07%	23	0.32%	0	0.00%	-93	-1.28%	7,282
Total	632,863	49.47%	619,931	48.46%	20,051	1.57%	3,040	0.24%	3,421	0.27%	12,932	1.01%	1,279,306

==== Counties that flipped from Republican to Democratic ====
- Adams
- Appanoose
- Audubon
- Benton
- Boone
- Cerro Gordo
- Chickasaw
- Clarke
- Crawford
- Dallas
- Davis
- Decatur
- Des Moines
- Floyd
- Greene
- Guthrie
- Hamilton
- Henry
- Howard
- Jackson
- Jasper
- Keokuk
- Kossuth
- Lee
- Linn
- Lucas
- Madison
- Marion
- Mitchell
- Monona
- Monroe
- Palo Alto
- Pocahontas
- Polk
- Poweshiek
- Ringgold
- Tama
- Union
- Van Buren
- Warren
- Webster
- Wayne
- Worth
- Wright
- Wapello

=== By congressional district ===
Ford won five congressional districts, three of which elected democrats, while Carter won one .

District	Ford	Carter	Representative
1st	48.9%	48.7%	Jim Leach
2nd	49.4%	48.5%	Mike Blouin
3rd	50.8%	47.5%	Chuck Grassley
4th	44.9%	52.9%	Neal Edward Smith
5th	49.9%	48.0%	Tom Harkin
6th	53.3%	44.9%	Berkley Bedell

== See also ==
- United States presidential elections in Iowa
