= Elections in Iowa =

The number of elections in Iowa varies from year to year. Presidential elections are held every four years.

United States presidential election results for Iowa
Year	Republican / Whig		Democratic		Third party(ies)	
Year	No.	%	No.	%	No.	%
1848	9,930	44.59%	11,238	50.46%	1,103	4.95%
1852	15,856	44.84%	17,763	50.23%	1,745	4.93%
1856	45,073	48.83%	37,568	40.70%	9,669	10.47%
1860	70,302	54.61%	55,639	43.22%	2,798	2.17%
1864	88,500	64.12%	49,525	35.88%	0	0.00%
1868	120,399	61.92%	74,040	38.08%	0	0.00%
1872	131,566	60.81%	71,189	32.90%	13,610	6.29%
1876	171,326	58.50%	112,121	38.28%	9,431	3.22%
1880	183,904	56.99%	105,845	32.80%	32,919	10.20%
1884	197,089	52.25%	177,316	47.01%	2,796	0.74%
1888	211,603	52.36%	179,877	44.51%	12,655	3.13%
1892	219,795	49.60%	196,367	44.31%	26,997	6.09%
1896	289,293	54.42%	233,741	43.97%	8,513	1.60%
1900	307,808	58.04%	209,265	39.46%	13,282	2.50%
1904	308,158	63.39%	149,276	30.71%	28,659	5.90%
1908	275,209	55.62%	200,771	40.58%	18,789	3.80%
1912	119,805	24.33%	185,325	37.64%	187,226	38.03%
1916	280,439	54.25%	221,699	42.89%	14,806	2.86%
1920	634,674	70.91%	227,921	25.46%	32,487	3.63%
1924	537,458	55.02%	160,382	16.42%	278,930	28.56%
1928	623,570	61.77%	379,311	37.57%	6,608	0.65%
1932	414,433	39.98%	598,019	57.69%	24,235	2.34%
1936	487,977	42.70%	621,756	54.41%	33,000	2.89%
1940	632,370	52.03%	578,800	47.62%	4,260	0.35%
1944	547,267	51.99%	499,876	47.49%	5,456	0.52%
1948	494,018	47.58%	522,380	50.31%	21,874	2.11%
1952	808,906	63.75%	451,513	35.59%	8,354	0.66%
1956	729,187	59.06%	501,858	40.65%	3,519	0.29%
1960	722,381	56.71%	550,565	43.22%	864	0.07%
1964	449,148	37.92%	733,030	61.88%	2,361	0.20%
1968	619,106	53.01%	476,699	40.82%	72,126	6.18%
1972	706,207	57.61%	496,206	40.48%	23,531	1.92%
1976	632,863	49.47%	619,931	48.46%	26,512	2.07%
1980	676,026	51.31%	508,672	38.60%	132,963	10.09%
1984	703,088	53.27%	605,620	45.89%	11,097	0.84%
1988	545,355	44.50%	670,557	54.71%	9,702	0.79%
1992	504,891	37.27%	586,353	43.29%	263,363	19.44%
1996	492,644	39.92%	620,258	50.26%	121,173	9.82%
2000	634,373	48.22%	638,517	48.54%	42,673	3.24%
2004	751,957	49.90%	741,898	49.23%	13,053	0.87%
2008	682,379	44.39%	828,940	53.93%	25,804	1.68%
2012	730,617	46.18%	822,544	51.99%	29,019	1.83%
2016	800,983	51.15%	653,669	41.74%	111,379	7.11%
2020	897,672	53.09%	759,061	44.89%	34,138	2.02%
2024	927,019	55.73%	707,278	42.52%	29,209	1.76%

Since 1972, Iowa has been the first state to vote in presidential primaries, with their caucuses. As with presidential elections, gubernatorial elections are held every four years - but are staggered such that they are held on general elections independently of the presidential election. Members of the Iowa Senate are elected every four years, with half of the Senate elected at each general election; all members of the Iowa House of Representatives are elected every two years. Additionally, elections for various government officials, judicial retention elections, and elections on referendums occur as part of various elections in Iowa.

In a 2020 study, Iowa was ranked as the 24th easiest state for citizens to vote in.

== Electoral system ==
=== Party system ===
The Iowa Caucus is an electoral event in which residents meet in precinct caucuses in all of Iowa's 1,681 precincts and elect delegates to the corresponding county conventions.

== General elections ==
In Iowa, a general election is held on Election Day during even-numbered years. In addition to the elections for the chief executive and legislature of the United States and of Iowa, general elections in Iowa include statewide elections for the Secretary of State, Auditor of State, Treasurer of State, Secretary of Agriculture, and Attorney General. Also included are judicial retention elections and proposed amendments to the Iowa Constitution, along with various local elections.

== Local elections ==
In Iowa, various local officials are elected at the general election. However, school and city elections are not held during a general election, but at a different regularly scheduled time. Regular school elections are held on the second Tuesday in September during odd-numbered years. Regular city elections are held on Election Day during odd-numbered years.

== Special elections ==
In Iowa, special elections may be held throughout the year to fill various governmental vacancies or to vote on ballot initiatives. Special elections are generally held on Tuesdays and may not generally be held on the same day as a general or local election.

== See also ==
- United States presidential elections in Iowa
- 2026 Iowa elections
