= United States presidential elections in Iowa =

Presidential elections in Iowa
- Number of elections: 45
- Voted Democratic: 14
- Voted Republican: 31
- Voted other: 0
- Voted for winning candidate: 33
- Voted for losing candidate: 12

Following is a table of United States presidential elections in Iowa, ordered by year. Since its admission to statehood in 1846, Iowa has participated in every U.S. presidential election.

Winners of the state are in bold. The shading refers to the state winner, and not the national winner.

== Elections from 1864 to present ==
View source data.

| Year | Winner (nationally) | Votes | Percent | Runner-up (nationally) | Votes | Percent | Other national candidates (Note: For purposes of these lists, other national candidates are defined as those who won at least one electoral vote, or won at least ten percent of the vote in multiple states.) | Votes | Percent | Electoral votes | Notes |
|---|---|---|---|---|---|---|---|---|---|---|---|
| 2024 | **Donald Trump** | 927,019 | 55.73 | Kamala Harris | 707,278 | 42.52 | - | | | 6 | |
| 2020 | Joe Biden | 759,061 | 44.89 | **Donald Trump** | 897,672 | 53.09 | — | | | 6 | |
| 2016 | **Donald Trump** (Note: Won the electoral college while losing the popular vote) | 800,983 | 51.15 | Hillary Clinton | 653,669 | 41.74 | - | | | 6 | |
| 2012 | **Barack Obama** | 822,544 | 51.99 | Mitt Romney | 730,617 | 46.18 | - | | | 6 | |
| 2008 | **Barack Obama** | 828,940 | 53.93 | John McCain | 682,379 | 44.39 | - | | | 7 | |
| 2004 | **George W. Bush** | 751,957 | 49.90 | John Kerry | 741,898 | 49.23 | - | | | 7 | |
| 2000 | George W. Bush | 634,373 | 48.22 | **Al Gore** | 638,517 | 48.54 | - | | | 7 | |
| 1996 | **Bill Clinton** | 620,258 | 50.26 | Bob Dole | 492,644 | 39.92 | Ross Perot | 105,159 | 8.52 | 7 | |
| 1992 | **Bill Clinton** | 586,353 | 43.29 | George H. W. Bush | 504,891 | 37.27 | Ross Perot | 253,468 | 18.71 | 7 | |
| 1988 | George H. W. Bush | 545,355 | 44.50 | **Michael Dukakis** | 670,557 | 54.71 | - | | | 8 | |
| 1984 | **Ronald Reagan** | 703,088 | 53.27 | Walter Mondale | 605,620 | 45.89 | - | | | 8 | |
| 1980 | **Ronald Reagan** | 676,026 | 51.31 | Jimmy Carter | 508,672 | 38.60 | John B. Anderson | 115,633 | 8.78 | 8 | |
| 1976 | Jimmy Carter | 619,931 | 48.46 | **Gerald Ford** | 632,863 | 49.47 | - | | | 8 | |
| 1972 | **Richard Nixon** | 706,207 | 57.61 | George McGovern | 496,206 | 40.48 | - | | | 8 | |
| 1968 | **Richard Nixon** | 619,106 | 53.01 | Hubert Humphrey | 476,699 | 40.82 | George Wallace | 66,422 | 5.69 | 9 | |
| 1964 | **Lyndon B. Johnson** | 733,030 | 61.88 | Barry Goldwater | 449,148 | 37.92 | - | | | 9 | |
| 1960 | John F. Kennedy | 550,565 | 43.22 | **Richard Nixon** | 722,381 | 56.71 | - | | | 10 | |
| 1956 | **Dwight D. Eisenhower** | 729,187 | 59.06 | Adlai Stevenson II | 501,858 | 40.65 | T. Coleman Andrews/ Unpledged Electors (Note: Was allied with a slate of unpledged electors in Louisiana, Mississippi and South Carolina) | 3,202 | 0.26 | 10 | |
| 1952 | **Dwight D. Eisenhower** | 808,906 | 63.75 | Adlai Stevenson II | 451,513 | 35.59 | - | | | 10 | |
| 1948 | **Harry S. Truman** | 522,380 | 50.31 | Thomas E. Dewey | 494,018 | 47.58 | Strom Thurmond | - | | 10 | |
| 1944 | Franklin D. Roosevelt | 499,876 | 47.49 | **Thomas E. Dewey** | 547,267 | 51.99 | - | | | 10 | |
| 1940 | Franklin D. Roosevelt | 578,800 | 47.62 | **Wendell Willkie** | 632,370 | 52.03 | - | | | 11 | |
| 1936 | **Franklin D. Roosevelt** | 621,756 | 54.41 | Alf Landon | 487,977 | 42.7 | - | | | 11 | |
| 1932 | **Franklin D. Roosevelt** | 598,019 | 57.69 | Herbert Hoover | 414,433 | 39.98 | - | | | 11 | |
| 1928 | **Herbert Hoover** | 623,570 | 61.77 | Al Smith | 379,311 | 37.57 | - | | | 13 | |
| 1924 | **Calvin Coolidge** | 537,635 | 55.03 | John W. Davis | 162,600 | 16.64 | Robert M. La Follette | 272,243 | 27.87 | 13 | |
| 1920 | **Warren G. Harding** | 634,674 | 70.91 | James M. Cox | 227,921 | 25.46 | Parley P. Christensen | 10,321 | 1.15 | 13 | |
| 1916 | Woodrow Wilson | 218,699 | 42.55 | **Charles E. Hughes** | 280,439 | 54.57 | - | | | 13 | |
| 1912 | **Woodrow Wilson** | 185,325 | 37.64 | Theodore Roosevelt | 161,819 | 32.87 | William H. Taft | 119,805 | 24.33 | 13 | |
| 1908 | **William H. Taft** | 275,209 | 55.62 | William Jennings Bryan | 200,771 | 40.58 | - | | | 13 | |
| 1904 | **Theodore Roosevelt** | 308,158 | 63.39 | Alton B. Parker | 149,276 | 30.71 | - | | | 13 | |
| 1900 | **William McKinley** | 307,808 | 58.04 | William Jennings Bryan | 209,265 | 39.46 | - | | | 13 | |
| 1896 | **William McKinley** | 289,293 | 55.47 | William Jennings Bryan | 223,741 | 42.9 | - | | | 13 | |
| 1892 | Grover Cleveland | 196,367 | 44.31 | **Benjamin Harrison** | 219,795 | 49.6 | James B. Weaver | 20,595 | 4.65 | 13 | |
| 1888 | **Benjamin Harrison** | 211,603 | 52.36 | Grover Cleveland | 179,877 | 44.51 | - | | | 13 | |
| 1884 | Grover Cleveland | 177,316 | 47.01 | **James G. Blaine** | 197,089 | 52.25 | - | | | 13 | |
| 1880 | **James A. Garfield** | 183,904 | 56.99 | Winfield S. Hancock | 105,845 | 32.8 | James B. Weaver | 32,327 | 10.02 | 11 | |
| 1876 | **Rutherford B. Hayes** | 171,326 | 58.50 | Samuel J. Tilden | 112,121 | 38.28 | - | | | 11 | |
| 1872 | **Ulysses S. Grant** | 131,566 | 60.81 | Horace Greeley | 81,636 | 37.73 | - | | | 11 | |
| 1868 | **Ulysses S. Grant** | 120,399 | 61.92 | Horatio Seymour | 74,040 | 38.08 | - | | | 8 | |
| 1864 | **Abraham Lincoln** | 83,858 | 63.08 | George B. McClellan | 49,089 | 36.92 | - | | | 8 | |

== Election of 1860 ==
The election of 1860 was a complex realigning election in which the breakdown of the previous two-party alignment culminated in four parties each competing for influence in different parts of the country. The result of the election, with the victory of an ardent opponent of slavery, spurred the secession of eleven states and brought about the American Civil War.

| Year | Winner (nationally) | Votes | Percent | Runner-up (nationally) | Votes | Percent | Runner-up (nationally) | Votes | Percent | Runner-up (nationally) | Votes | Percent | Electoral votes |
|---|---|---|---|---|---|---|---|---|---|---|---|---|---|
| 1860 | **Abraham Lincoln** | 70,302 | 54.6 | Stephen A. Douglas | 55,639 | 43.2 | John C. Breckinridge | 1,035 | 0.8 | John Bell | 1,763 | 1.4 | 4 |

== Elections prior to 1860 ==
| Year | Winner (nationally) | Votes | Percent | Runner-up (nationally) | Votes | Percent | Other national candidates | Votes | Percent | Electoral votes | Notes |
|---|---|---|---|---|---|---|---|---|---|---|---|
| 1856 | James Buchanan | 37,568 | 40.7 | **John C. Frémont** | 45,073 | 48.83 | Millard Fillmore | 9,669 | 10.47 | 4 | |
| 1852 | **Franklin Pierce** | 17,763 | 50.23 | Winfield Scott | 15,856 | 44.84 | John P. Hale | 1,606 | 4.54 | 4 | |
| 1848 | Zachary Taylor | 9,930 | 44.59 | **Lewis Cass** | 11,238 | 50.46 | Martin Van Buren | 1,103 | 4.95 | 4 | |

== See also ==
- Elections in Iowa
