= 1956 United States presidential election in Iowa =

- November 6, 1956

All 10 Iowa votes to the Electoral College

Nominee	Dwight D. Eisenhower	Adlai Stevenson
Party	Republican	Democratic
Home state	Pennsylvania (Note: Although he was born in Texas and grew up in Kansas before his military career, at the time of the 1952 election Eisenhower was president of Columbia University and was, officially, a resident of New York. During his first term as president, he moved his private residence to Gettysburg, Pennsylvania, and officially changed his residency to Pennsylvania.)	Illinois
Running mate	Richard Nixon	Estes Kefauver
Electoral vote	10	0
Popular vote	729,187	501,858
Percentage	59.06%	40.65%
County results
Eisenhower
50–60%
60–70%
70–80%
Stevenson
50–60%
President before election
Dwight D. Eisenhower
Republican
Elected President
Dwight D. Eisenhower
Republican

The 1956 United States presidential election in Iowa took place on November 6, 1956, as part of the 1956 United States presidential election. Iowa voters chose ten representatives, or electors, to the Electoral College, who voted for president and vice president.

Iowa was won by incumbent President Dwight D. Eisenhower (R–Pennsylvania), running with Vice President Richard Nixon, with 59.06% of the popular vote, against Adlai Stevenson (D–Illinois), running with Senator Estes Kefauver, with 40.65% of the popular vote. Iowa's result weighed in as exactly 3% more Republican than the nation-at-large. Eisenhower carried every county except for Wapello County, thereby making him the first Republican to win the White House without carrying this county since Abraham Lincoln in 1860; this would be the last time a Republican presidential candidate won Dubuque County until Donald Trump in 2016.

== Results ==
1956 United States presidential election in Iowa
Party	Candidate	Votes	%
Republican	Dwight D. Eisenhower (inc.)	729,187	59.06%
Democratic	Adlai Stevenson	501,858	40.65%
American Constitution Party of Iowa	T. Coleman Andrews	3,202	0.26%
Socialist	Darlington Hoopes	192	0.02%
Socialist Labor	Eric Hass	125	0.01%
Total votes		1,234,564	100%

=== Results by county ===
County	Dwight D. Eisenhower Republican		Adlai Stevenson Democratic		T. Coleman Andrews American Constitution		Various candidates Other parties		Margin		Total votes cast
County	#	%	#	%	#	%	#	%	#	%	Total votes cast
Adair	3,426	59.16%	2,362	40.79%	3	0.05%	0	0.00%	1,064	18.37%	5,791
Adams	2,248	55.92%	1,756	43.68%	13	0.32%	3	0.07%	492	12.24%	4,020
Allamakee	5,182	66.23%	2,622	33.51%	18	0.23%	2	0.03%	2,560	32.72%	7,824
Appanoose	4,980	55.00%	4,064	44.89%	10	0.11%	0	0.00%	916	10.11%	9,054
Audubon	3,057	54.16%	2,585	45.80%	0	0.00%	2	0.04%	472	8.36%	5,644
Benton	5,634	56.31%	3,946	39.44%	421	4.21%	5	0.05%	1,688	16.87%	10,006
Black Hawk	28,250	57.99%	20,403	41.88%	56	0.11%	10	0.02%	7,847	16.11%	48,719
Boone	6,740	53.65%	5,815	46.28%	9	0.07%	0	0.00%	925	7.37%	12,564
Bremer	5,930	67.15%	2,892	32.75%	9	0.10%	0	0.00%	3,038	34.40%	8,831
Buchanan	5,512	61.01%	3,513	38.88%	9	0.10%	1	0.01%	1,999	22.13%	9,035
Buena Vista	6,470	61.25%	4,083	38.65%	7	0.07%	3	0.03%	2,387	22.60%	10,563
Butler	5,669	71.21%	2,289	28.75%	3	0.04%	0	0.00%	3,380	42.46%	7,961
Calhoun	4,409	57.49%	2,972	38.75%	286	3.73%	2	0.03%	1,437	18.74%	7,669
Carroll	5,816	53.29%	5,085	46.60%	9	0.08%	3	0.03%	731	6.69%	10,913
Cass	6,103	68.34%	2,818	31.56%	9	0.10%	0	0.00%	3,285	36.78%	8,930
Cedar	5,344	64.71%	2,912	35.26%	1	0.01%	1	0.01%	2,432	29.45%	8,258
Cerro Gordo	12,449	57.00%	9,362	42.86%	21	0.10%	9	0.04%	3,087	14.14%	21,841
Cherokee	4,821	59.67%	3,254	40.28%	3	0.04%	1	0.01%	1,567	19.39%	8,079
Chickasaw	4,205	56.10%	3,275	43.70%	15	0.20%	0	0.00%	930	12.40%	7,495
Clarke	2,462	55.99%	1,929	43.87%	5	0.11%	1	0.02%	533	12.12%	4,397
Clay	5,107	62.36%	2,970	36.26%	101	1.23%	12	0.15%	2,137	26.10%	8,190
Clayton	6,529	59.76%	4,384	40.12%	12	0.11%	1	0.01%	2,145	19.64%	10,926
Clinton	14,765	63.62%	8,394	36.17%	29	0.12%	20	0.09%	6,371	27.45%	23,208
Crawford	4,608	55.03%	3,749	44.77%	15	0.18%	2	0.02%	859	10.26%	8,374
Dallas	6,619	56.06%	5,185	43.92%	2	0.02%	0	0.00%	1,434	12.14%	11,806
Davis	2,661	51.88%	2,458	47.92%	10	0.19%	0	0.00%	203	3.96%	5,129
Decatur	2,912	50.86%	2,806	49.01%	6	0.10%	1	0.02%	106	1.85%	5,725
Delaware	5,732	68.49%	2,621	31.32%	13	0.16%	3	0.04%	3,111	37.17%	8,369
Des Moines	11,152	55.88%	8,781	44.00%	17	0.09%	8	0.04%	2,371	11.88%	19,958
Dickinson	3,641	59.14%	2,498	40.57%	13	0.21%	5	0.08%	1,143	18.57%	6,157
Dubuque	17,923	57.36%	13,174	42.16%	133	0.43%	17	0.05%	4,749	15.20%	31,247
Emmet	4,193	63.68%	2,386	36.24%	4	0.06%	1	0.02%	1,807	27.44%	6,584
Fayette	7,914	61.51%	4,935	38.36%	13	0.10%	4	0.03%	2,979	23.15%	12,866
Floyd	6,172	62.17%	3,739	37.66%	14	0.14%	2	0.02%	2,433	24.51%	9,927
Franklin	4,563	64.41%	2,513	35.47%	7	0.10%	1	0.01%	2,050	28.94%	7,084
Fremont	3,241	58.81%	2,254	40.90%	14	0.25%	2	0.04%	987	17.91%	5,511
Greene	4,255	59.41%	2,802	39.12%	105	1.47%	0	0.00%	1,453	20.29%	7,162
Grundy	4,915	71.99%	1,908	27.95%	4	0.06%	0	0.00%	3,007	44.04%	6,827
Guthrie	4,283	58.91%	2,981	41.00%	4	0.06%	2	0.03%	1,302	17.91%	7,270
Hamilton	5,667	59.56%	3,829	40.25%	15	0.16%	3	0.03%	1,838	19.31%	9,514
Hancock	4,305	60.51%	2,803	39.40%	4	0.06%	2	0.03%	1,502	21.11%	7,114
Hardin	6,642	63.67%	3,775	36.19%	6	0.06%	9	0.09%	2,867	27.48%	10,432
Harrison	5,209	58.30%	3,709	41.51%	17	0.19%	0	0.00%	1,500	16.79%	8,935
Henry	5,818	68.49%	2,667	31.39%	10	0.12%	0	0.00%	3,151	37.10%	8,495
Howard	3,491	52.85%	3,106	47.02%	7	0.11%	1	0.02%	385	5.83%	6,605
Humboldt	3,747	57.58%	2,756	42.35%	4	0.06%	0	0.00%	991	15.23%	6,507
Ida	3,226	60.75%	2,083	39.23%	1	0.02%	0	0.00%	1,143	21.52%	5,310
Iowa	4,875	62.68%	2,753	35.40%	139	1.79%	10	0.13%	2,122	27.28%	7,777
Jackson	5,575	62.61%	3,181	35.72%	147	1.65%	2	0.02%	2,394	26.89%	8,905
Jasper	9,310	56.67%	7,098	43.21%	14	0.09%	6	0.04%	2,212	13.46%	16,428
Jefferson	4,807	62.76%	2,845	37.15%	7	0.09%	0	0.00%	1,962	25.61%	7,659
Johnson	11,298	56.28%	8,767	43.67%	11	0.05%	0	0.00%	2,531	12.61%	20,076
Jones	5,605	62.51%	3,352	37.38%	6	0.07%	4	0.04%	2,253	25.13%	8,967
Keokuk	4,680	56.13%	3,649	43.76%	7	0.08%	2	0.02%	1,031	12.37%	8,338
Kossuth	6,680	54.74%	5,514	45.18%	6	0.05%	4	0.03%	1,166	9.56%	12,204
Lee	11,571	58.35%	8,226	41.48%	29	0.15%	3	0.02%	3,345	16.87%	19,829
Linn	33,402	60.60%	21,667	39.31%	40	0.07%	7	0.01%	11,735	21.29%	55,116
Louisa	3,184	63.07%	1,858	36.81%	6	0.12%	0	0.00%	1,326	26.26%	5,048
Lucas	3,397	58.25%	2,431	41.68%	3	0.05%	1	0.02%	966	16.57%	5,832
Lyon	4,356	70.83%	1,790	29.11%	4	0.07%	0	0.00%	2,566	41.72%	6,150
Madison	3,883	59.34%	2,652	40.53%	5	0.08%	4	0.06%	1,231	18.81%	6,544
Mahaska	6,864	62.21%	3,965	35.93%	201	1.82%	4	0.04%	2,899	26.28%	11,034
Marion	6,830	56.13%	5,316	43.69%	18	0.15%	4	0.03%	1,514	12.44%	12,168
Marshall	10,305	62.74%	5,755	35.04%	357	2.17%	8	0.05%	4,550	27.70%	16,425
Mills	3,539	64.89%	1,897	34.78%	17	0.31%	1	0.02%	1,642	30.11%	5,454
Mitchell	4,175	61.29%	2,630	38.61%	5	0.07%	2	0.03%	1,545	22.68%	6,812
Monona	3,854	52.47%	3,477	47.34%	12	0.16%	2	0.03%	377	5.13%	7,345
Monroe	2,984	53.17%	2,616	46.61%	9	0.16%	3	0.05%	368	6.56%	5,612
Montgomery	5,027	65.77%	2,597	33.98%	19	0.25%	0	0.00%	2,430	31.79%	7,643
Muscatine	8,552	59.81%	5,718	39.99%	22	0.15%	6	0.04%	2,834	19.82%	14,298
O'Brien	6,138	67.32%	2,970	32.57%	8	0.09%	2	0.02%	3,168	34.75%	9,118
Osceola	2,986	62.57%	1,779	37.28%	7	0.15%	0	0.00%	1,207	25.29%	4,772
Page	7,380	70.98%	3,001	28.86%	13	0.13%	3	0.03%	4,379	42.12%	10,397
Palo Alto	3,795	51.14%	3,624	48.83%	2	0.03%	0	0.00%	171	2.31%	7,421
Plymouth	7,246	67.42%	3,502	32.58%	0	0.00%	0	0.00%	3,744	34.84%	10,748
Pocahontas	3,606	52.89%	3,201	46.95%	9	0.13%	2	0.03%	405	5.94%	6,818
Polk	62,392	54.02%	53,025	45.91%	59	0.05%	15	0.01%	9,367	8.11%	115,491
Pottawattamie	17,632	57.87%	12,731	41.78%	96	0.32%	9	0.03%	4,901	16.09%	30,468
Poweshiek	5,145	58.81%	3,602	41.17%	1	0.01%	1	0.01%	1,543	17.64%	8,749
Ringgold	2,713	60.42%	1,775	39.53%	2	0.04%	0	0.00%	938	20.89%	4,490
Sac	4,874	59.99%	3,248	39.98%	2	0.02%	1	0.01%	1,626	20.01%	8,125
Scott	27,965	59.37%	18,969	40.27%	146	0.31%	24	0.05%	8,996	19.10%	47,104
Shelby	4,425	56.78%	3,300	42.35%	68	0.87%	0	0.00%	1,125	14.43%	7,793
Sioux	9,651	78.29%	2,666	21.63%	11	0.09%	0	0.00%	6,985	56.66%	12,328
Story	13,264	67.54%	6,352	32.34%	20	0.10%	4	0.02%	6,912	35.20%	19,640
Tama	5,952	55.25%	4,795	44.51%	23	0.21%	3	0.03%	1,157	10.74%	10,773
Taylor	3,533	59.10%	2,436	40.75%	7	0.12%	2	0.03%	1,097	18.35%	5,978
Union	4,666	62.21%	2,828	37.70%	7	0.09%	0	0.00%	1,838	24.51%	7,501
Van Buren	3,233	63.79%	1,833	36.17%	1	0.02%	1	0.02%	1,400	27.62%	5,068
Wapello	10,401	48.65%	10,960	51.26%	16	0.07%	4	0.02%	-559	-2.61%	21,381
Warren	5,430	59.19%	3,729	40.65%	15	0.16%	0	0.00%	1,701	18.54%	9,174
Washington	5,844	65.84%	3,022	34.05%	8	0.09%	2	0.02%	2,822	31.79%	8,876
Wayne	3,340	56.64%	2,553	43.29%	4	0.07%	0	0.00%	787	13.35%	5,897
Webster	11,097	52.72%	9,901	47.04%	33	0.16%	18	0.09%	1,196	5.68%	21,049
Winnebago	3,926	60.84%	2,521	39.07%	5	0.08%	1	0.02%	1,405	21.77%	6,453
Winneshiek	6,192	59.20%	4,251	40.64%	14	0.13%	3	0.03%	1,941	18.56%	10,460
Woodbury	25,399	55.89%	19,997	44.00%	41	0.09%	8	0.02%	5,402	11.89%	45,445
Worth	2,700	52.25%	2,465	47.71%	1	0.02%	1	0.02%	235	4.54%	5,167
Wright	5,512	58.70%	3,865	41.16%	12	0.13%	1	0.01%	1,647	17.54%	9,390
Totals	729,187	59.06%	501,858	40.65%	3,202	0.26%	317	0.03%	227,329	18.41%	1,234,564

==== Counties that flipped from Republican to Democratic ====
- Wapello

== See also ==
- United States presidential elections in Iowa
