= 1848 United States presidential election in Iowa =

- November 7, 1848
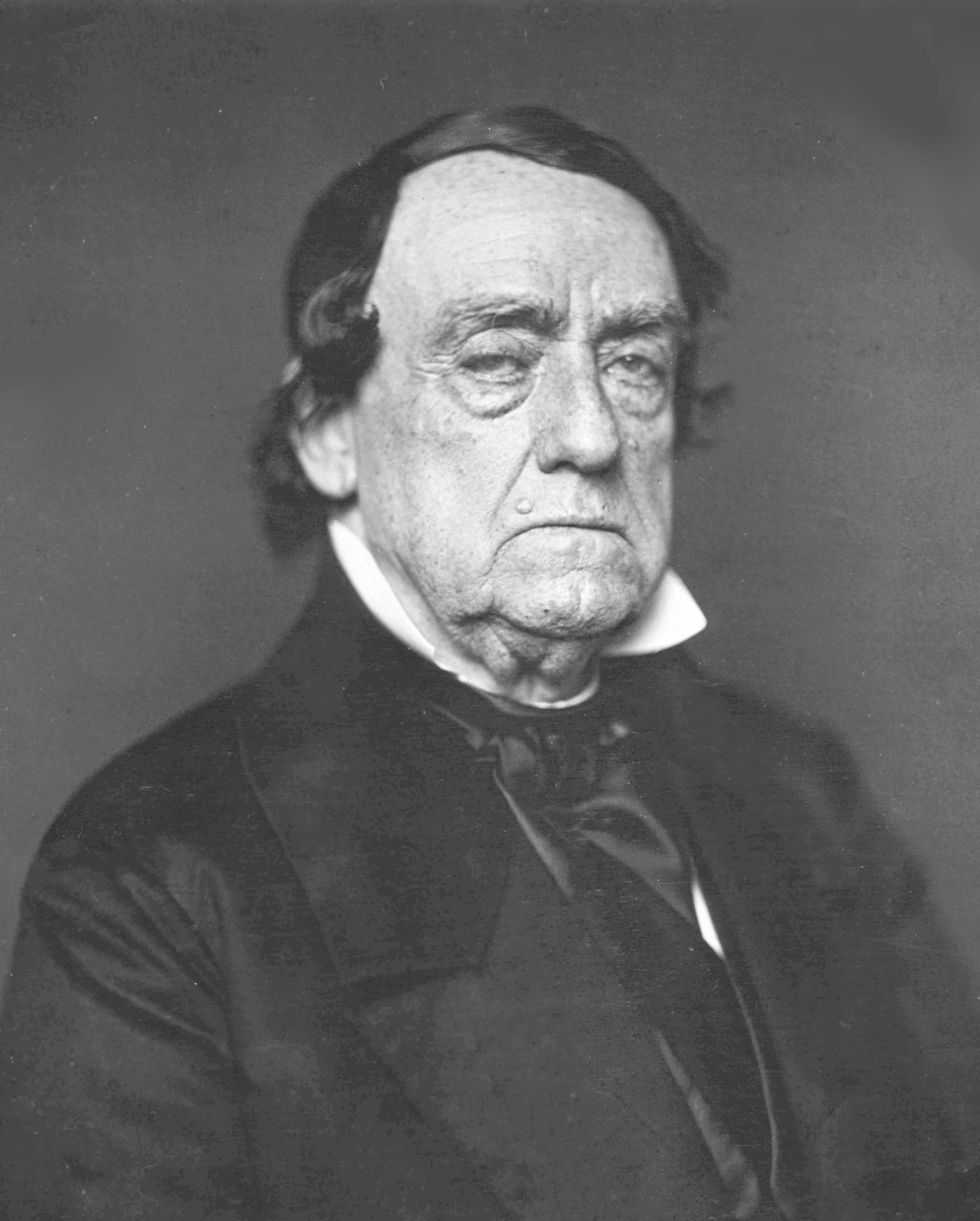

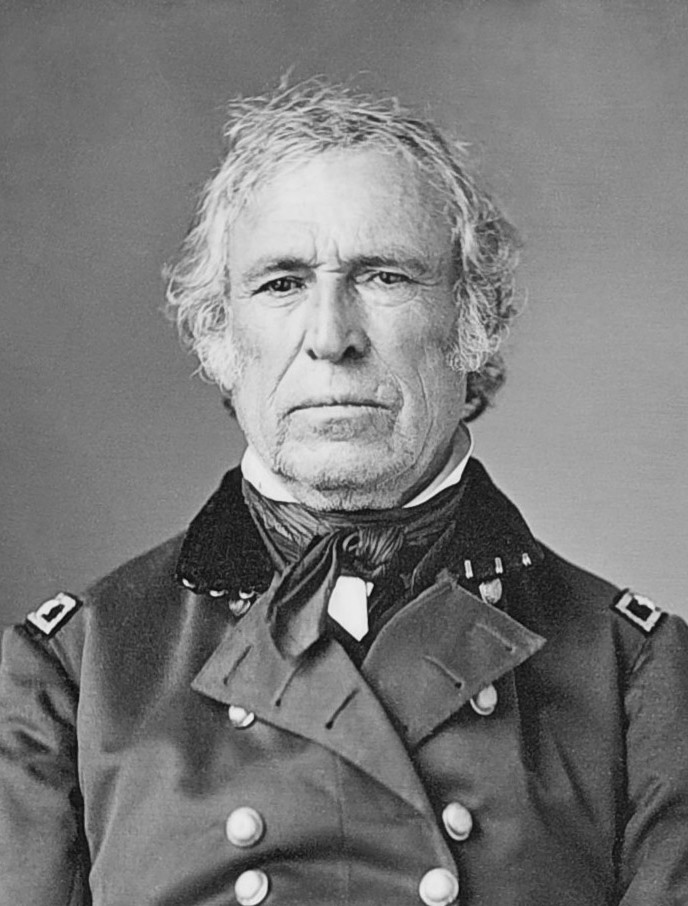
Nominee	Lewis Cass	Zachary Taylor
Party	Democratic	Whig
Home state	Michigan	Louisiana
Running mate	William O. Butler	Millard Fillmore
Electoral vote	4	0
Popular vote	11,238	9,930
Percentage	50.46%	44.59%
County results
Cass
40–50%
50–60%
60–70%
Taylor
40–50%
50–60%
President before election
James K. Polk
Democratic
Elected President
Zachary Taylor
Whig

The 1848 United States presidential election in Iowa took place on November 7, 1848, as part of the 1848 United States presidential election. Voters chose four representatives, or electors to the Electoral College, who voted for President and Vice President.

Iowa voted for the Democratic candidate Lewis Cass in the state's first presidential election, over Whig candidate Zachary Taylor and Free Soil candidate Martin Van Buren. Cass won Iowa by a margin of 5.87%.

This is one of just three times (the others being 1988 and 2000) that a losing Democrat carried Iowa. Taylor became the first of currently only six American presidents to have never won Iowa since its statehood.

The 1848 election in Iowa began a trend in which the state would vote the same as neighboring Wisconsin, as the two states have voted in lockstep with each other on all but 6 occasions - 1892, 1924, 1940, 1976, 2004, and 2020.

== Results ==
1848 United States presidential election in Iowa
Party	Candidate	Running mate	Popular vote		Electoral vote	
Party	Candidate	Running mate	Count	%	Count	%
Democratic	Lewis Cass of Michigan	William O. Butler of Kentucky	11,238	50.46%	4	100.00%
Whig	Zachary Taylor of Louisiana	Millard Fillmore of New York	9,930	44.59%	0	0.00%
Free Soil	Martin Van Buren of New York	Charles Francis Adams Sr. of Massachusetts	1,103	4.95%	0	0.00%
Total			22,271	100.00%	4	100.00%

== See also ==
- United States presidential elections in Iowa
