= 1872 United States presidential election in Iowa =

- November 5, 1872
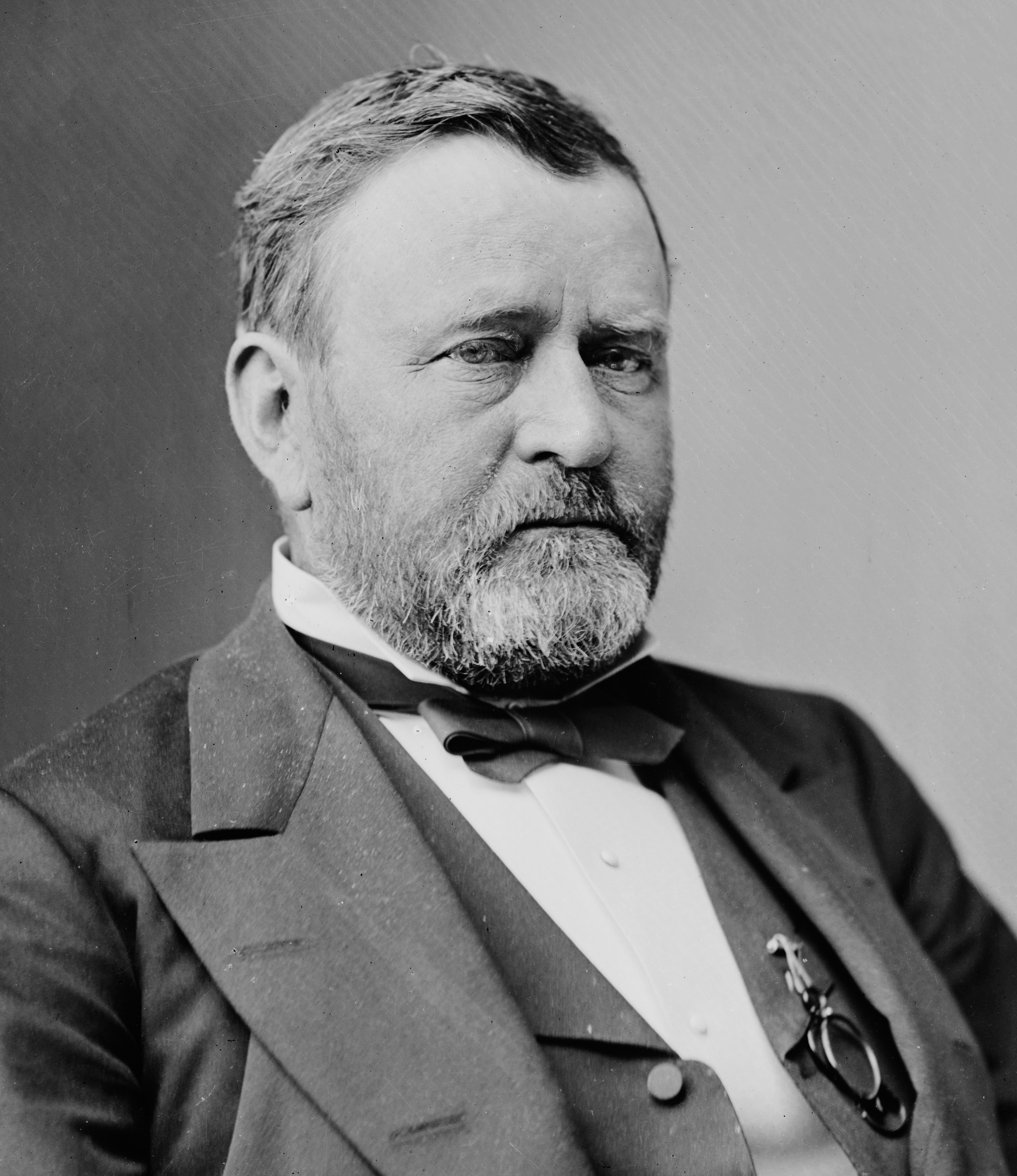

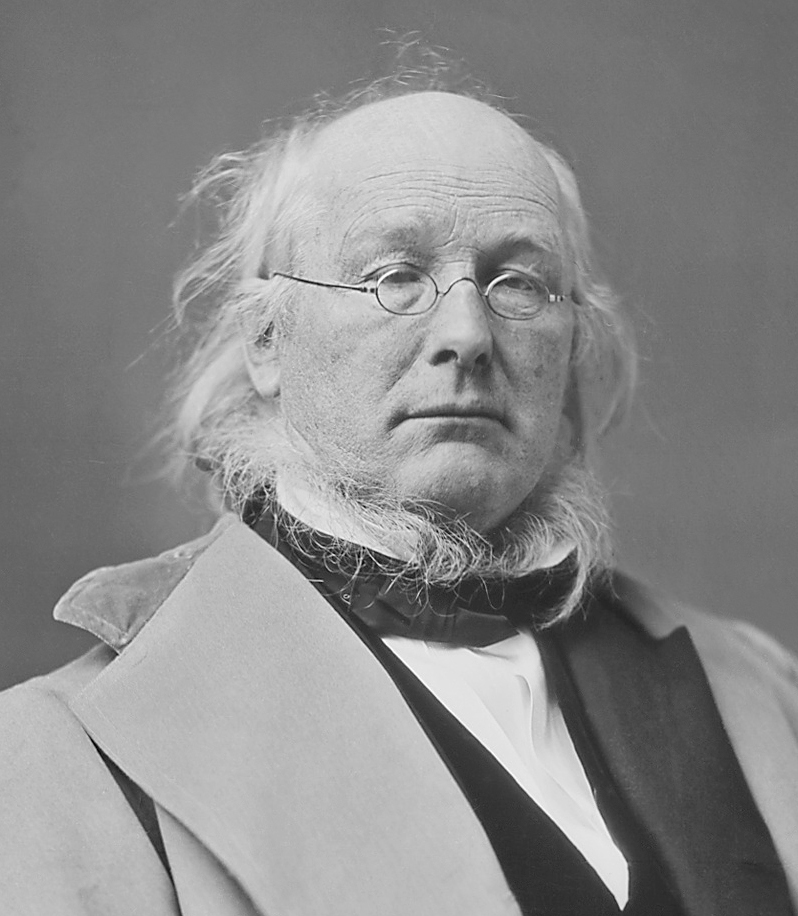
Nominee	Ulysses S. Grant	Horace Greeley
Party	Republican	Liberal Republican
Home state	Illinois	New York
Running mate	Henry Wilson	Benjamin G. Brown
Electoral vote	11	0
Popular vote	131,566	81,636 (Note: Greeley won 71,189 votes (32.9%) as the Liberal nominee, and 10,447 votes (4.83%) as the Liberal Republican Nominee.)
Percentage	60.81%	37.73%
County results
Grant
40–50%
50–60%
60–70%
70–80%
80–90%
90–100%
Greeley
50–60%
President before election
Ulysses S. Grant
Republican
Elected President
Ulysses S. Grant
Republican

The 1872 United States presidential election in Iowa took place on November 5, 1872. All contemporary 37 states were part of the 1872 United States presidential election. The state voters chose 11 electors to the Electoral College, which selected the president and vice president.

Iowa was won by the Republican nominees, incumbent President Ulysses S. Grant of Illinois, and his running mate Senator Henry Wilson of Massachusetts. Grant and Wilson defeated the Liberal Republican and Democratic nominees, former Congressman Horace Greeley of New York and his running mate former Senator and Governor Benjamin Gratz Brown of Missouri.

Grant won the state by a margin of 23.08%.

== Results ==
1872 United States presidential election in Iowa
Party	Candidate	Running mate	Popular vote		Electoral vote	
Party	Candidate	Running mate	Count	%	Count	%
Republican	Ulysses S. Grant of Illinois	Henry Wilson of Massachusetts	131,566	60.81%	11	100.00%
Liberal Republican	Horace Greeley of New York	Benjamin Gratz Brown of Missouri	81,636	37.73%	0	0.00%
Bourbon Democrat	Charles O'Conor	John Quincy Adams II	2,221	1.03%	0	0.00%
Write-ins	N/A	N/A	942	0.44%	0	0.00%
Total			216,365	100.00%	11	100.00%

== See also ==
- United States presidential elections in Iowa
