= 1932 United States presidential election in Iowa =

- November 8, 1932

All 11 Iowa votes to the Electoral College

Nominee	Franklin D. Roosevelt	Herbert Hoover
Party	Democratic	Republican
Home state	New York	California
Running mate	John Nance Garner	Charles Curtis
Electoral vote	11	0
Popular vote	598,019	414,433
Percentage	57.69%	39.98%
County results
Roosevelt
40–50%
50–60%
60–70%
70–80%
Hoover
40–50%
50–60%
President before election
Herbert Hoover
Republican
Elected President
Franklin D. Roosevelt
Democratic

The 1932 United States presidential election in Iowa took place on November 8, 1932, as part of the 1932 United States presidential election. Iowa voters chose 11 representatives, or electors, to the Electoral College, who voted for president and vice president.

Iowa was won by Governor Franklin D. Roosevelt (D–New York), running with Speaker John Nance Garner, with 57.69% of the popular vote, against incumbent President Herbert Hoover (R–California) who was born in Iowa, running with Vice President Charles Curtis, with 39.98% of the popular vote. This is the only occasion since the Civil War when Cass County and Page County have voted for a Democratic presidential candidate.

As a result of his win, Roosevelt became the first Democratic presidential candidate since Woodrow Wilson in 1912 to win Iowa and the first since Franklin Pierce in 1852 to win the state with a majority of the popular vote (Wilson had won only a plurality in the state).

== Results ==
1932 United States presidential election in Iowa
Party	Candidate	Votes	%
Democratic	Franklin D. Roosevelt	598,019	57.69%
Republican	Herbert Hoover (inc.)	414,433	39.98%
Socialist	Norman Thomas	20,467	1.97%
Prohibition	William Upshaw	2,111	0.20%
Farmer–Labor	Jacob Coxey	1,094	0.11%
Communist	William Z. Foster	559	0.05%
Write-in		4	0.00%
Total votes		1,036,687	100%

=== Results by county ===
County	Franklin Delano Roosevelt Democratic		Herbert Clark Hoover Republican		Various candidates Other parties		Margin		Total votes cast
County	#	%	#	%	#	%	#	%	Total votes cast
Adair	2,607	52.68%	2,305	46.58%	37	0.75%	302	6.10%	4,949
Adams	2,097	53.24%	1,795	45.57%	47	1.19%	302	7.67%	3,939
Allamakee	4,783	60.95%	3,009	38.34%	56	0.71%	1,774	22.60%	7,848
Appanoose	5,519	55.10%	4,229	42.22%	269	2.69%	1,290	12.88%	10,017
Audubon	2,986	64.45%	1,604	34.62%	43	0.93%	1,382	29.83%	4,633
Benton	6,070	61.82%	3,424	34.87%	325	3.31%	2,646	26.95%	9,819
Black Hawk	14,660	49.25%	14,746	49.54%	359	1.21%	-86	-0.29%	29,765
Boone	5,293	54.44%	3,694	38.00%	735	7.56%	1,599	16.45%	9,722
Bremer	5,411	67.69%	2,520	31.52%	63	0.79%	2,891	36.16%	7,994
Buchanan	5,004	52.67%	4,401	46.33%	95	1.00%	603	6.35%	9,500
Buena Vista	4,835	58.89%	3,162	38.51%	213	2.59%	1,673	20.38%	8,210
Butler	4,028	56.60%	3,012	42.33%	76	1.07%	1,016	14.28%	7,116
Calhoun	4,368	62.61%	2,404	34.46%	205	2.94%	1,964	28.15%	6,977
Carroll	7,174	75.52%	2,265	23.84%	60	0.63%	4,909	51.68%	9,499
Cass	4,339	50.19%	4,215	48.76%	91	1.05%	124	1.43%	8,645
Cedar	4,718	58.48%	3,277	40.62%	73	0.90%	1,441	17.86%	8,068
Cerro Gordo	8,752	53.96%	7,317	45.12%	149	0.92%	1,435	8.85%	16,218
Cherokee	4,701	63.68%	2,570	34.81%	111	1.50%	2,131	28.87%	7,382
Chickasaw	5,047	65.75%	2,585	33.68%	44	0.57%	2,462	32.07%	7,676
Clarke	2,342	58.11%	1,608	39.90%	80	1.99%	734	18.21%	4,030
Clay	3,944	58.27%	2,599	38.40%	226	3.34%	1,345	19.87%	6,769
Clayton	7,347	65.99%	3,725	33.46%	62	0.56%	3,622	32.53%	11,134
Clinton	12,587	57.53%	9,085	41.52%	208	0.95%	3,502	16.01%	21,880
Crawford	6,084	68.04%	2,334	26.10%	524	5.86%	3,750	41.94%	8,942
Dallas	4,887	50.85%	4,516	46.99%	208	2.16%	371	3.86%	9,611
Davis	3,351	64.50%	1,757	33.82%	87	1.67%	1,594	30.68%	5,195
Decatur	3,591	61.60%	2,148	36.84%	91	1.56%	1,443	24.75%	5,830
Delaware	4,559	52.08%	4,088	46.70%	107	1.22%	471	5.38%	8,754
Des Moines	9,395	59.94%	5,590	35.66%	690	4.40%	3,805	24.27%	15,675
Dickinson	2,500	53.12%	2,074	44.07%	132	2.80%	426	9.05%	4,706
Dubuque	19,210	71.15%	6,747	24.99%	1,042	3.86%	12,463	46.16%	26,999
Emmet	2,486	52.79%	2,129	45.21%	94	2.00%	357	7.58%	4,709
Fayette	7,690	59.05%	5,166	39.67%	166	1.27%	2,524	19.38%	13,022
Floyd	4,563	51.96%	4,083	46.50%	135	1.54%	480	5.47%	8,781
Franklin	3,782	61.90%	2,013	32.95%	315	5.16%	1,769	28.95%	6,110
Fremont	4,585	65.60%	2,339	33.47%	65	0.93%	2,246	32.14%	6,989
Greene	2,747	52.05%	2,360	44.71%	171	3.24%	387	7.33%	5,278
Grundy	3,661	59.68%	2,419	39.44%	54	0.88%	1,242	20.25%	6,134
Guthrie	3,099	53.32%	2,637	45.37%	76	1.31%	462	7.95%	5,812
Hamilton	5,191	68.09%	2,330	30.56%	103	1.35%	2,861	37.53%	7,624
Hancock	3,822	61.11%	2,355	37.66%	77	1.23%	1,467	23.46%	6,254
Hardin	5,022	54.32%	3,523	38.10%	701	7.58%	1,499	16.21%	9,246
Harrison	7,427	67.47%	3,513	31.91%	68	0.62%	3,914	35.56%	11,008
Henry	4,518	55.96%	3,398	42.09%	158	1.96%	1,120	13.87%	8,074
Howard	4,176	62.72%	2,426	36.44%	56	0.84%	1,750	26.28%	6,658
Humboldt	2,804	57.35%	2,028	41.48%	57	1.17%	776	15.87%	4,889
Ida	3,661	70.58%	1,452	27.99%	74	1.43%	2,209	42.59%	5,187
Iowa	4,376	58.35%	2,628	35.04%	495	6.60%	1,748	23.31%	7,499
Jackson	5,094	59.94%	2,892	34.03%	513	6.04%	2,202	25.91%	8,499
Jasper	6,781	54.68%	5,399	43.54%	221	1.78%	1,382	11.14%	12,401
Jefferson	4,056	57.05%	2,955	41.56%	99	1.39%	1,101	15.49%	7,110
Johnson	8,764	60.51%	5,484	37.87%	235	1.62%	3,280	22.65%	14,483
Jones	4,952	58.25%	3,500	41.17%	49	0.58%	1,452	17.08%	8,501
Keokuk	5,839	62.32%	3,442	36.74%	88	0.94%	2,397	25.58%	9,369
Kossuth	6,925	68.24%	3,075	30.30%	148	1.46%	3,850	37.94%	10,148
Lee	10,624	59.35%	7,084	39.57%	194	1.08%	3,540	19.77%	17,902
Linn	17,693	47.93%	18,733	50.75%	489	1.32%	-1,040	-2.82%	36,915
Louisa	2,856	57.25%	2,045	40.99%	88	1.76%	811	16.26%	4,989
Lucas	3,434	57.46%	2,381	39.84%	161	2.69%	1,053	17.62%	5,976
Lyon	3,543	66.89%	1,684	31.79%	70	1.32%	1,859	35.10%	5,297
Madison	2,923	51.69%	2,663	47.09%	69	1.22%	260	4.60%	5,655
Mahaska	5,586	52.14%	4,655	43.45%	472	4.41%	931	8.69%	10,713
Marion	7,067	64.05%	3,695	33.49%	272	2.47%	3,372	30.56%	11,034
Marshall	6,385	47.36%	6,604	48.98%	494	3.66%	-219	-1.62%	13,483
Mills	3,861	60.75%	2,420	38.07%	75	1.18%	1,441	22.67%	6,356
Mitchell	3,940	60.16%	2,527	38.59%	82	1.25%	1,413	21.58%	6,549
Monona	5,537	70.88%	2,181	27.92%	94	1.20%	3,356	42.96%	7,812
Monroe	3,716	57.83%	2,458	38.25%	252	3.92%	1,258	19.58%	6,426
Montgomery	3,760	50.80%	3,507	47.39%	134	1.81%	253	3.42%	7,401
Muscatine	6,423	49.73%	6,160	47.69%	334	2.59%	263	2.04%	12,917
O'Brien	4,503	57.38%	3,213	40.94%	132	1.68%	1,290	16.44%	7,848
Osceola	2,590	67.64%	1,190	31.08%	49	1.28%	1,400	36.56%	3,829
Page	4,863	51.15%	4,512	47.46%	132	1.39%	351	3.69%	9,507
Palo Alto	4,094	62.33%	2,378	36.21%	96	1.46%	1,716	26.13%	6,568
Plymouth	7,565	71.62%	2,888	27.34%	110	1.04%	4,677	44.28%	10,563
Pocahontas	4,245	67.16%	1,800	28.48%	276	4.37%	2,445	38.68%	6,321
Polk	31,517	45.89%	34,023	49.54%	3,132	4.56%	-2,506	-3.65%	68,672
Pottawattamie	16,674	62.65%	9,565	35.94%	377	1.42%	7,109	26.71%	26,616
Poweshiek	4,649	55.64%	3,490	41.77%	216	2.59%	1,159	13.87%	8,355
Ringgold	2,480	53.64%	2,082	45.04%	61	1.32%	398	8.61%	4,623
Sac	4,165	56.52%	3,131	42.49%	73	0.99%	1,034	14.03%	7,369
Scott	16,887	52.03%	14,218	43.81%	1,350	4.16%	2,669	8.22%	32,455
Shelby	4,940	65.52%	2,478	32.86%	122	1.62%	2,462	32.65%	7,540
Sioux	6,170	60.48%	3,943	38.65%	89	0.87%	2,227	21.83%	10,202
Story	5,638	43.40%	6,735	51.84%	619	4.76%	-1,097	-8.44%	12,992
Tama	6,704	61.39%	4,051	37.10%	165	1.51%	2,653	24.29%	10,920
Taylor	3,159	53.33%	2,670	45.07%	95	1.60%	489	8.25%	5,924
Union	3,967	56.01%	3,043	42.96%	73	1.03%	924	13.05%	7,083
Van Buren	3,135	56.17%	2,375	42.56%	71	1.27%	760	13.62%	5,581
Wapello	9,504	55.66%	7,256	42.49%	316	1.85%	2,248	13.16%	17,076
Warren	3,542	47.81%	3,725	50.28%	141	1.90%	-183	-2.47%	7,408
Washington	4,554	52.98%	3,889	45.25%	152	1.77%	665	7.74%	8,595
Wayne	3,896	61.57%	2,311	36.52%	121	1.91%	1,585	25.05%	6,328
Webster	8,957	59.25%	5,243	34.68%	917	6.07%	3,714	24.57%	15,117
Winnebago	3,281	59.67%	2,012	36.59%	206	3.75%	1,269	23.08%	5,499
Winneshiek	6,823	66.03%	3,348	32.40%	162	1.57%	3,475	33.63%	10,333
Woodbury	26,397	66.12%	12,764	31.97%	761	1.91%	13,633	34.15%	39,922
Worth	2,640	60.07%	1,690	38.45%	65	1.48%	950	21.62%	4,395
Wright	4,922	59.06%	3,262	39.14%	150	1.80%	1,660	19.92%	8,334
Totals	598,019	57.69%	414,433	39.98%	24,235	2.34%	183,586	17.71%	1,036,687

==== Counties that flipped from Republican to Democratic ====
- Adair
- Adams
- Cass
- Delaware
- Floyd
- Guthrie
- Henry
- Jefferson
- Madison
- Montgomery
- Page
- Ringgold
- Taylor
- Union
- Van Buren
- Washington
- Allamakee
- Bremer
- Buchanan
- Butler
- Cedar
- Cherokee
- Chickasaw
- Clarke
- Clayton
- Clinton
- Dickinson
- Des Moines
- Dubuque
- Fayette
- Franklin
- Greene
- Grundy
- Hancock
- Hardin
- Harrison
- Howard
- Ida
- Iowa
- Jackson
- Jones
- Keokuk
- Lee
- Linn
- Louisa
- Lucas
- Lyon
- Mahaska
- Mills
- Mitchell
- Muscatine
- O'Brien
- Osceola
- Palo Alto
- Pottawattamie
- Sac
- Sioux
- Tama
- Story
- Wayne
- Winnebago
- Winneshiek
- Clay
- Dallas
- Emmet
- Fremont
- Appanoose
- Benton
- Black Hawk
- Boone
- Buena Vista
- Calhoun
- Cerro Gordo
- Davis
- Decatur
- Hamilton
- Howard
- Humboldt
- Jasper
- Johnson
- Kossuth
- Marion
- Monona
- Monroe
- Pocahontas
- Polk
- Poweshiek
- Scott
- Wapello
- Webster
- Woodbury
- Worth
- Wright

== See also ==
- United States presidential elections in Iowa
