= 1864 United States presidential election in Iowa =

- November 8, 1864
- Turnout: 19.70% of the total population ▲0.63 pp

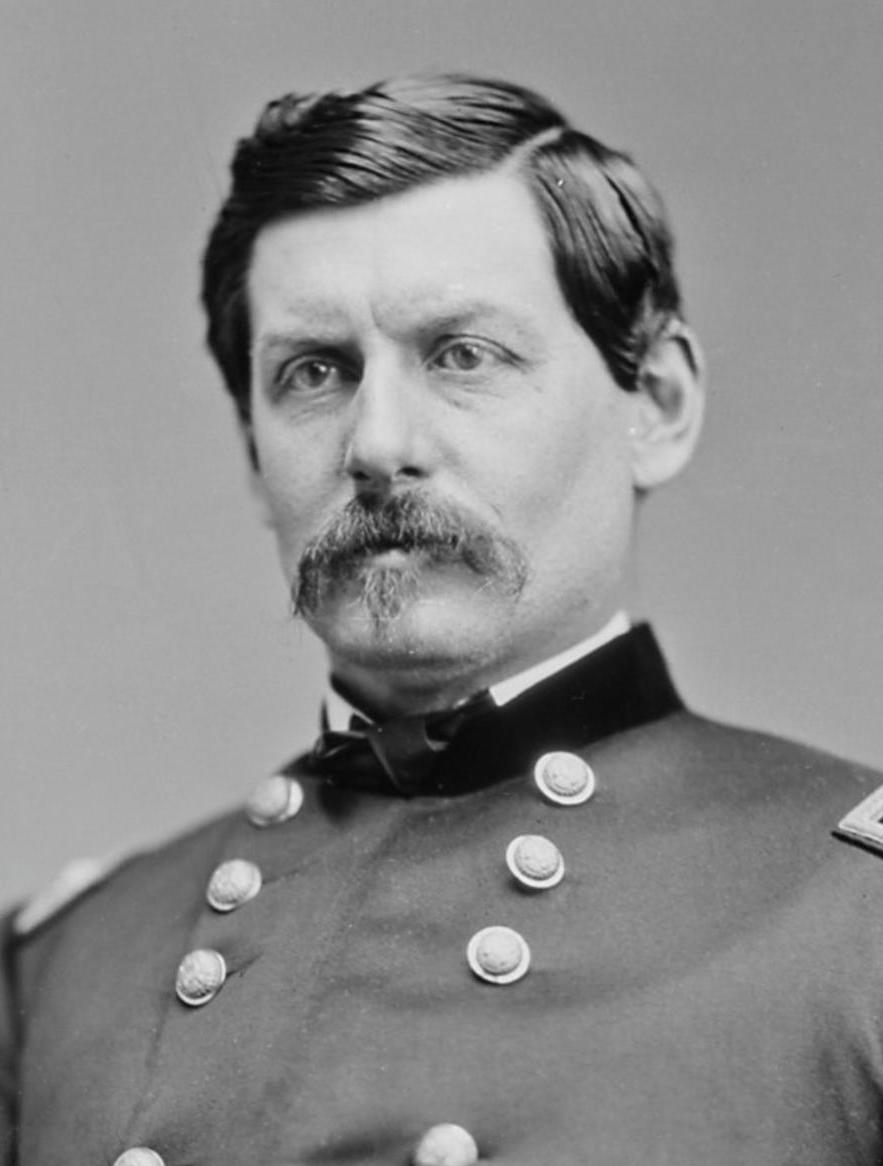
Nominee	Abraham Lincoln	George B. McClellan
Party	National Union	Democratic
Home state	Illinois	New Jersey
Running mate	Andrew Johnson	George H. Pendleton
Electoral vote	8	0
Popular vote	88,500	49,525
Percentage	64.12%	35.88%
County results
Lincoln
50–60%
60–70%
70–80%
80–90%
90–100%
McClellan
50–60%
60–70%
70–80%
80–90%
Tie
~50%
President before election
Abraham Lincoln
Republican
Elected President
Abraham Lincoln
National Union

The 1864 United States presidential election in Iowa took place on November 8, 1864, as part of the 1864 United States presidential election. State voters chose eight representatives, or electors, to the Electoral College, who voted for president and vice president.

Iowa was won by the National Union candidate Republican incumbent President Abraham Lincoln of Illinois and his running mate former Senator and Military Governor of Tennessee Andrew Johnson. They defeated the Democratic candidate 4th Commanding General of the United States Army George B. McClellan of New Jersey and his running mate Representative George H. Pendleton of Ohio. Lincoln won the state by a margin of 28.24%.

== Results ==
1864 United States presidential election in Iowa
Party	Candidate	Running mate	Popular vote		Electoral vote	
Party	Candidate	Running mate	Count	%	Count	%
National Union	Abraham Lincoln of Illinois	Andrew Johnson of Tennessee	88,500	64.12%	8	100.00%
Democratic	George B. McClellan of New Jersey	George H. Pendleton of Ohio	49,525	35.88%	0	0.00%
Total			138,025	100.00%	8	100.00%

== See also ==
- United States presidential elections in Iowa
