= 1856 United States presidential election in Iowa =

- November 4, 1856
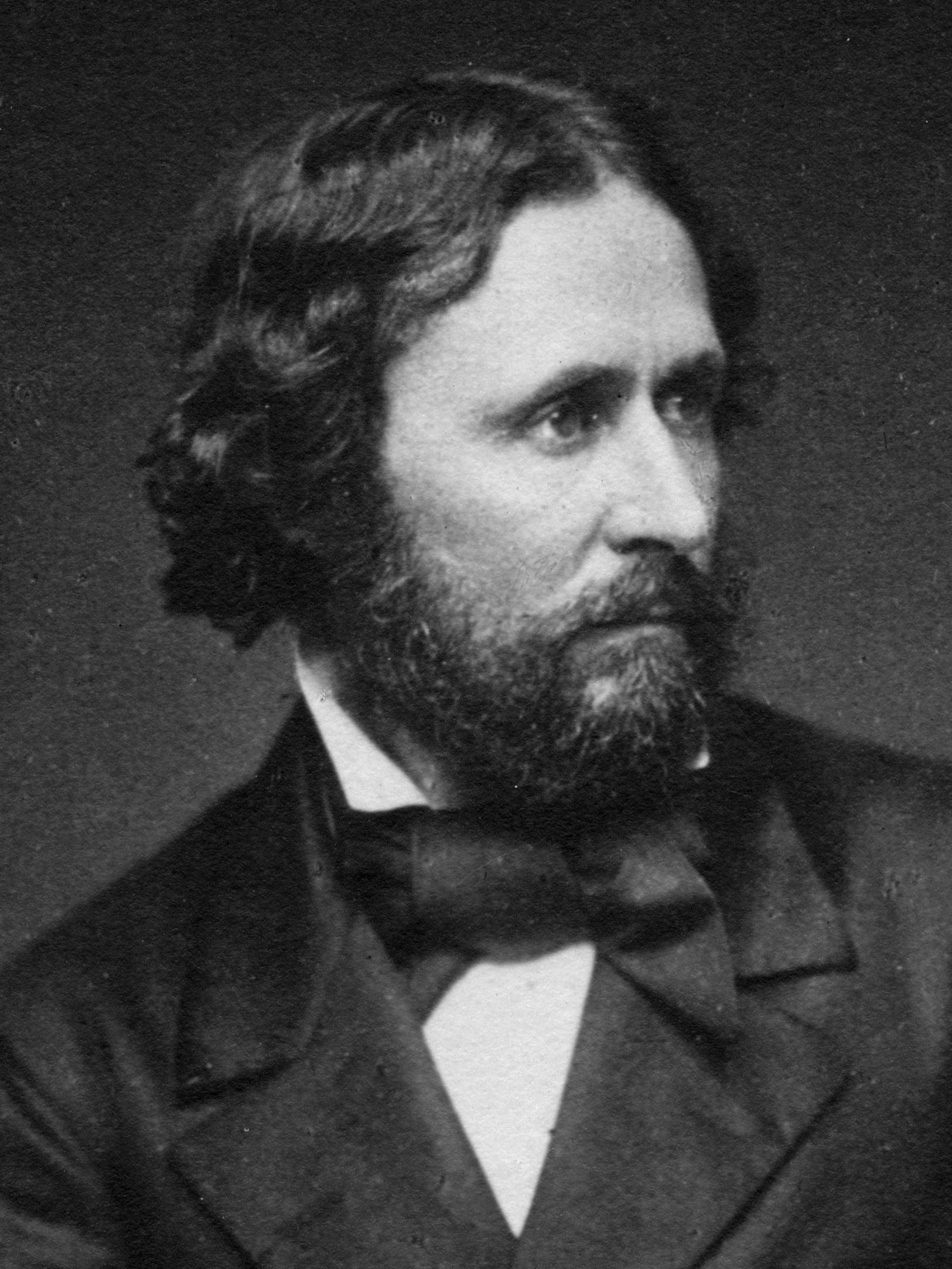

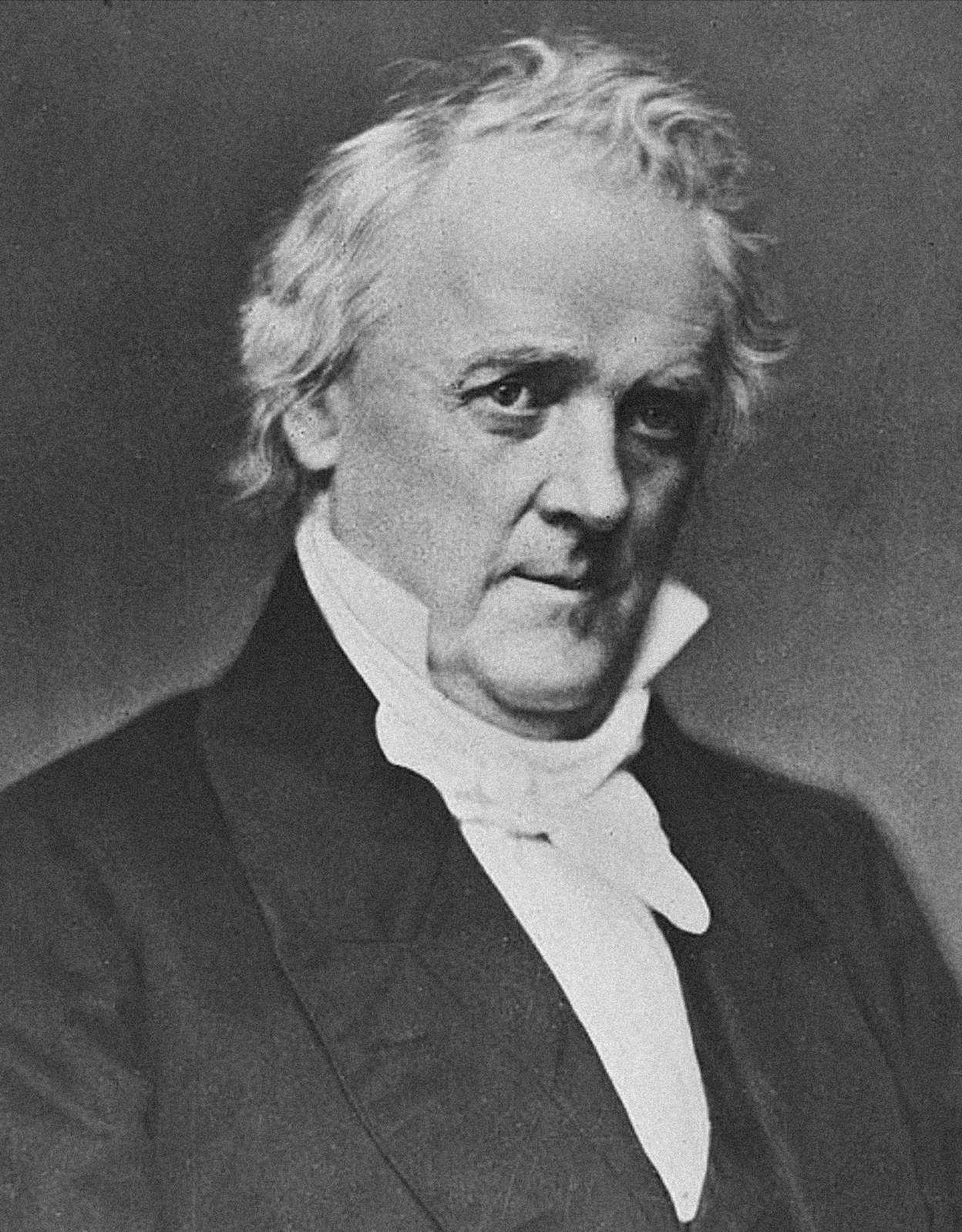

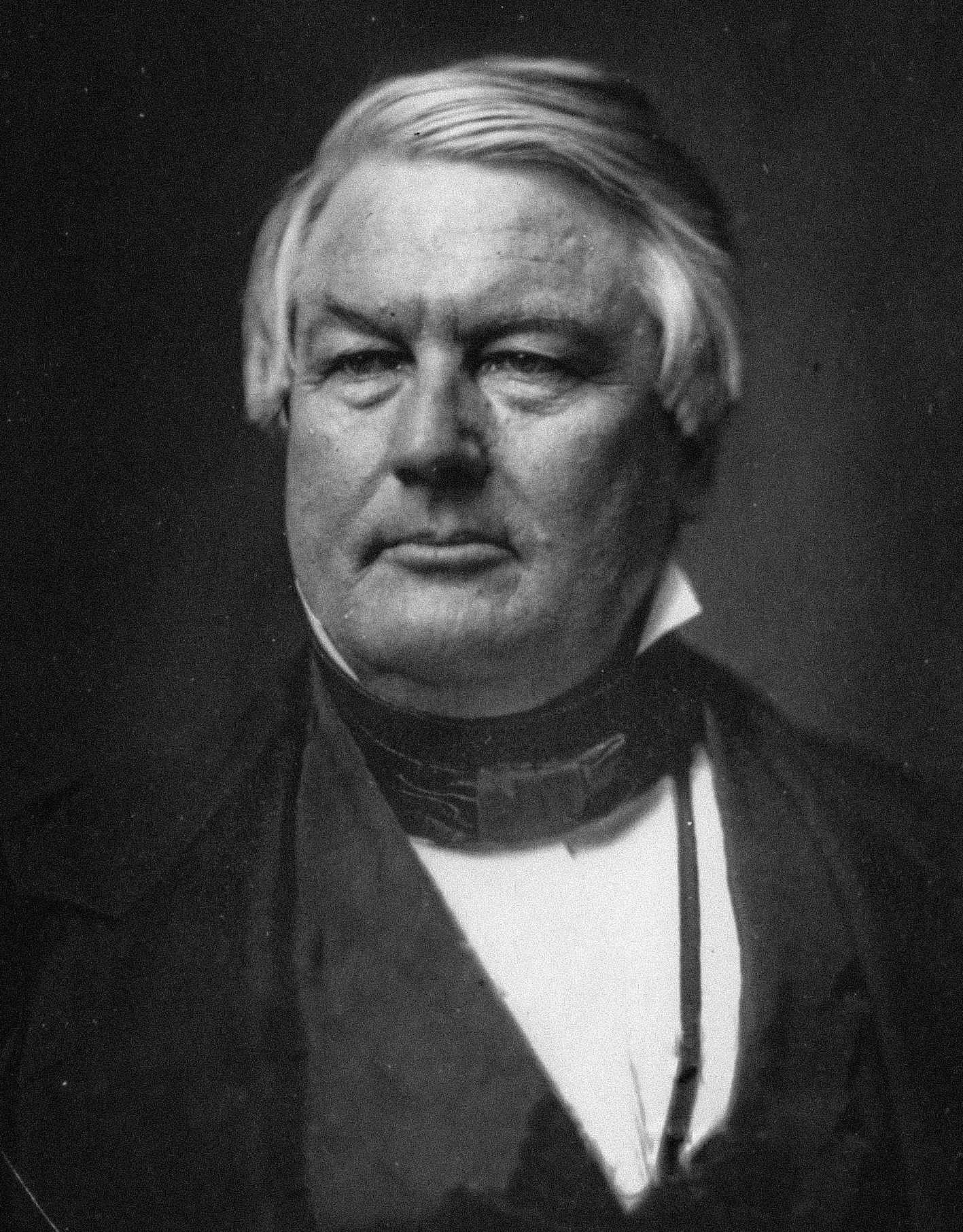
Nominee	John C. Frémont	James Buchanan	Millard Fillmore
Party	Republican	Democratic	Know Nothing
Home state	California	Pennsylvania	New York
Running mate	William L. Dayton	John C. Breckinridge	Andrew Jackson Donelson
Electoral vote	4	0	0
Popular vote	45,073	37,568	9,669
Percentage	48.83%	40.70%	10.47%
County results
Frémont
40–50%
50–60%
60–70%
70–80%
80–90%
90–100%
Buchanan
40–50%
50–60%
60–70%
President before election
Franklin Pierce
Democratic
Elected President
James Buchanan
Democratic

The 1856 United States presidential election in Iowa took place on November 4, 1856, as part of the 1856 United States presidential election. Voters chose four representatives, or electors to the Electoral College, who voted for president and vice president.

Iowa voted for the Republican candidate, John C. Frémont, over Democratic candidate, James Buchanan and American Party candidate Millard Fillmore. Frémont won Iowa by a margin of 8.13%.

Buchanan is the second of only 6 US presidents and the first of 4 Democratic presidents to have never won Iowa. He also didn't carry Buchanan County, which is named after him.

== Results ==
1856 United States presidential election in Iowa
Party	Candidate	Running mate	Popular vote		Electoral vote	
Party	Candidate	Running mate	Count	%	Count	%
Republican	John C. Frémont of California	William L. Dayton of New Jersey	45,073	48.83%	4	100.00%
Democratic	James Buchanan of Pennsylvania	John C. Breckinridge of Kentucky	37,568	40.70%	0	0.00%
Know Nothing	Millard Fillmore of New York	Andrew Jackson Donelson of Tennessee	9,669	10.47%	0	0.00%
Total			92,310	100.00%	4	100.00%

== See also ==
- United States presidential elections in Iowa
