= 1852 United States presidential election in Iowa =

- November 2, 1852

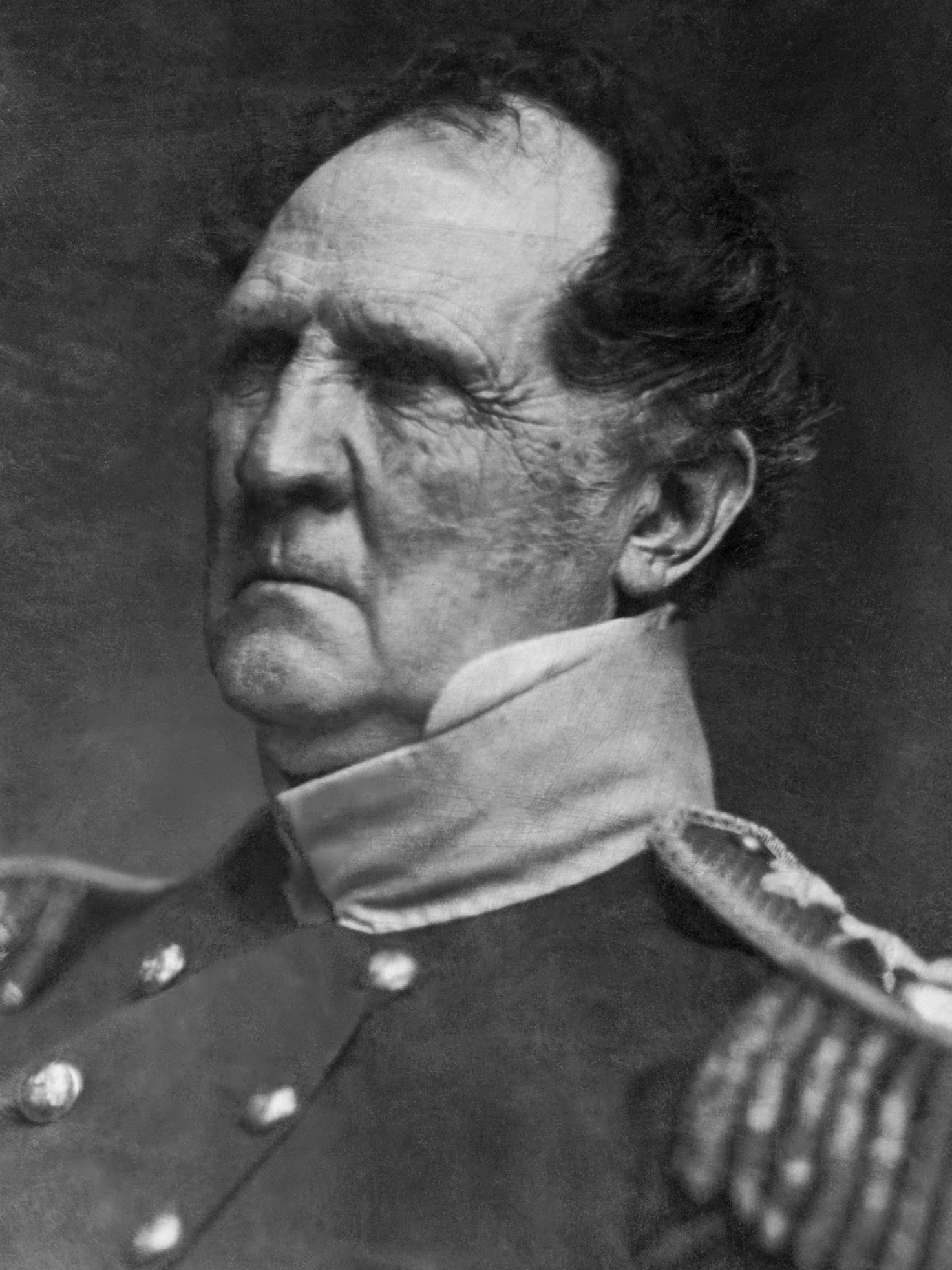
Nominee	Franklin Pierce	Winfield Scott
Party	Democratic	Whig
Home state	New Hampshire	New Jersey
Running mate	William R. King	William Alexander Graham
Electoral vote	4	0
Popular vote	17,763	15,856
Percentage	50.23%	44.84%
County results
Pierce
40–50%
50–60%
60–70%
70–80%
80–90%
Scott
40–50%
50–60%
Hale
40–50%
Tie
~50% Pierce & Scott
President before election
Millard Fillmore
Whig
Elected President
Franklin Pierce
Democratic

The 1852 United States presidential election in Iowa took place on November 2, 1852, as part of the 1852 United States presidential election. Voters chose four representatives, or electors to the Electoral College, who voted for President and Vice President.

Iowa voted for the Democratic candidate, Franklin Pierce, over Whig candidate Winfield Scott. Pierce won Iowa by a margin of 5.39%.

This would be the last time Iowa would back a Democratic presidential nominee until 1912, and the last time it would be with an absolute majority of the vote until 1932.

== Results ==
1852 United States presidential election in Iowa
Party	Candidate	Running mate	Popular vote		Electoral vote	
Party	Candidate	Running mate	Count	%	Count	%
Democratic	Franklin Pierce of New Hampshire	William R. King of Alabama	17,763	50.23%	4	100.00%
Whig	Winfield Scott of New Jersey	William Alexander Graham of North Carolina	15,856	44.84%	0	0.00%
Free Soil	John P. Hale of New Hampshire	George W. Julian of Indiana	1,606	4.54%	0	0.00%
	Write-in	N/A	139	0.39%	0	0.00%
Total			35,364	100.00%	4	100.00%

== See also ==
- United States presidential elections in Iowa
