= 1904 United States presidential election in Iowa =

- November 8, 1904
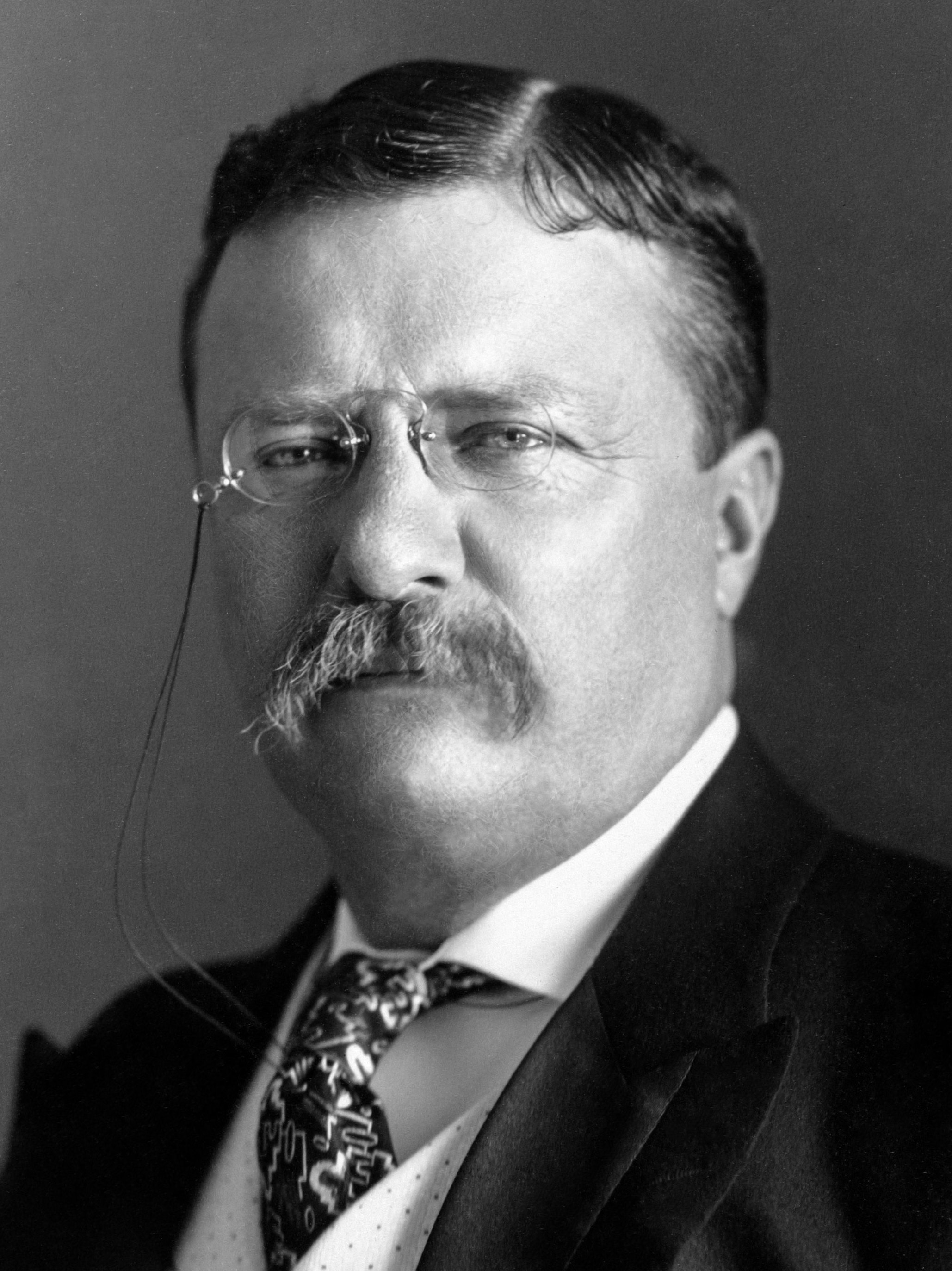

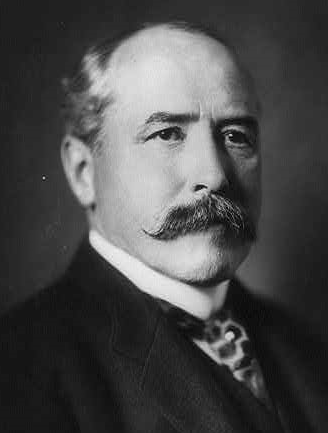
Nominee	Theodore Roosevelt	Alton B. Parker
Party	Republican	Democratic
Home state	New York	New York
Running mate	Charles W. Fairbanks	Henry G. Davis
Electoral vote	13	0
Popular vote	308,158	149,276
Percentage	63.39%	30.71%
County results
Roosevelt
40–50%
50–60%
60–70%
70–80%
80–90%
Parker
50–60%
President before election
Theodore Roosevelt
Republican
Elected President
Theodore Roosevelt
Republican

The 1904 United States presidential election in Iowa was held on Tuesday November 8, All contemporary 45 states were part of the 1904 United States presidential election. Voters chose 13 electors to the Electoral College, which selected the president and vice president.

Iowa was won by the Republican nominees, incumbent President Theodore Roosevelt of New York and his running mate Charles W. Fairbanks of Indiana. They defeated the Democratic nominees, former Chief Judge of New York Court of Appeals Alton B. Parker and his running mate, former US Senator Henry G. Davis of West Virginia. Roosevelt won the state by a wide margin of 32.68%.

== Results ==
1904 United States presidential election in Iowa
Party	Candidate	Votes	Percentage	Electoral votes
Republican	Theodore Roosevelt (incumbent)	308,158	63.39%	13
Democratic	Alton B. Parker	149,276	30.71%	0
Social Democratic	Eugene V. Debs	14,849	3.05%	0
Prohibition	Silas C. Swallow	11,603	2.39%	0
Populist	Thomas E. Watson	2,207	0.45%	0
Totals		486,093	100.00%	13
Voter turnout				—

=== Results by county ===
County	Theodore Roosevelt Republican		Alton Brooks Parker Democratic		Eugene Victor Debs Social Democratic		Silas Comfort Swallow Prohibition		Thomas Edward Watson Populist		Margin		Total votes cast
County	#	%	#	%	#	%	#	%	#	%	#	%	Total votes cast
Adair	2,303	68.22%	895	26.51%	66	1.95%	82	2.43%	30	0.89%	1,408	41.71%	3,376
Adams	1,761	58.92%	1,003	33.56%	40	1.34%	161	5.39%	24	0.80%	758	25.36%	2,989
Allamakee	2,609	61.77%	1,571	37.19%	9	0.21%	22	0.52%	13	0.31%	1,038	24.57%	4,224
Appanoose	3,607	59.86%	1,743	28.92%	545	9.04%	100	1.66%	31	0.51%	1,864	30.93%	6,026
Audubon	1,843	64.99%	934	32.93%	5	0.18%	48	1.69%	6	0.21%	909	32.05%	2,836
Benton	3,609	61.10%	2,057	34.82%	94	1.59%	110	1.86%	37	0.63%	1,552	26.27%	5,907
Black Hawk	5,236	66.90%	1,861	23.78%	471	6.02%	236	3.02%	23	0.29%	3,375	43.12%	7,827
Boone	3,830	65.66%	1,148	19.68%	599	10.27%	234	4.01%	22	0.38%	2,682	45.98%	5,833
Bremer	1,927	50.82%	1,783	47.02%	24	0.63%	48	1.27%	10	0.26%	144	3.80%	3,792
Buchanan	2,798	60.93%	1,545	33.65%	50	1.09%	192	4.18%	7	0.15%	1,253	27.29%	4,592
Buena Vista	2,483	76.17%	605	18.56%	66	2.02%	99	3.04%	7	0.21%	1,878	57.61%	3,260
Butler	2,743	74.99%	815	22.28%	14	0.38%	78	2.13%	8	0.22%	1,928	52.71%	3,658
Calhoun	2,479	67.44%	870	23.67%	106	2.88%	213	5.79%	8	0.22%	1,609	43.77%	3,676
Carroll	2,290	51.22%	2,040	45.63%	34	0.76%	91	2.04%	16	0.36%	250	5.59%	4,471
Cass	3,050	65.55%	1,394	29.96%	74	1.59%	96	2.06%	39	0.84%	1,656	35.59%	4,653
Cedar	2,691	56.94%	1,926	40.75%	17	0.36%	88	1.86%	4	0.08%	765	16.19%	4,726
Cerro Gordo	3,108	74.55%	836	20.05%	79	1.89%	130	3.12%	16	0.38%	2,272	54.50%	4,169
Cherokee	2,446	74.60%	688	20.98%	13	0.40%	107	3.26%	25	0.76%	1,758	53.61%	3,279
Chickasaw	1,972	51.74%	1,790	46.97%	14	0.37%	32	0.84%	3	0.08%	182	4.78%	3,811
Clarke	1,799	64.57%	896	32.16%	15	0.54%	64	2.30%	12	0.43%	903	32.41%	2,786
Clay	2,154	78.70%	487	17.79%	18	0.66%	59	2.16%	19	0.69%	1,667	60.91%	2,737
Clayton	3,339	54.59%	2,628	42.96%	68	1.11%	66	1.08%	16	0.26%	711	11.62%	6,117
Clinton	5,265	53.23%	4,074	41.19%	460	4.65%	54	0.55%	38	0.38%	1,191	12.04%	9,891
Crawford	2,530	54.08%	2,004	42.84%	51	1.09%	78	1.67%	15	0.32%	526	11.24%	4,678
Dallas	3,499	69.99%	1,159	23.18%	108	2.16%	218	4.36%	15	0.30%	2,340	46.81%	4,999
Davis	1,722	50.92%	1,533	45.33%	47	1.39%	49	1.45%	31	0.92%	189	5.59%	3,382
Decatur	2,430	58.44%	1,548	37.23%	71	1.71%	72	1.73%	37	0.89%	882	21.21%	4,158
Delaware	2,726	67.04%	1,236	30.40%	29	0.71%	68	1.67%	7	0.17%	1,490	36.65%	4,066
Des Moines	4,496	54.18%	3,043	36.67%	615	7.41%	124	1.49%	21	0.25%	1,453	17.51%	8,299
Dickinson	1,320	78.01%	312	18.44%	16	0.95%	37	2.19%	7	0.41%	1,008	59.57%	1,692
Dubuque	5,485	48.31%	4,913	43.27%	847	7.46%	52	0.46%	56	0.49%	572	5.04%	11,353
Emmet	1,732	80.15%	358	16.57%	24	1.11%	45	2.08%	2	0.09%	1,374	63.58%	2,161
Fayette	3,978	62.39%	2,070	32.47%	167	2.62%	140	2.20%	21	0.33%	1,908	29.92%	6,376
Floyd	2,820	76.28%	761	20.58%	32	0.87%	67	1.81%	17	0.46%	2,059	55.69%	3,697
Franklin	2,346	79.63%	531	18.02%	7	0.24%	45	1.53%	17	0.58%	1,815	61.61%	2,946
Fremont	2,227	56.94%	1,511	38.63%	46	1.18%	85	2.17%	42	1.07%	716	18.31%	3,911
Greene	2,583	70.27%	908	24.70%	25	0.68%	128	3.48%	32	0.87%	1,675	45.57%	3,676
Grundy	2,021	66.55%	938	30.89%	10	0.33%	59	1.94%	9	0.30%	1,083	35.66%	3,037
Guthrie	2,857	70.54%	1,032	25.48%	28	0.69%	91	2.25%	42	1.04%	1,825	45.06%	4,050
Hamilton	3,118	77.08%	746	18.44%	70	1.73%	103	2.55%	8	0.20%	2,372	58.64%	4,045
Hancock	2,112	78.40%	517	19.19%	4	0.15%	57	2.12%	4	0.15%	1,595	59.21%	2,694
Hardin	3,643	78.94%	749	16.23%	41	0.89%	167	3.62%	15	0.33%	2,894	62.71%	4,615
Harrison	3,364	62.05%	1,696	31.29%	221	4.08%	115	2.12%	25	0.46%	1,668	30.77%	5,421
Henry	2,647	64.47%	1,259	30.66%	35	0.85%	128	3.12%	37	0.90%	1,388	33.80%	4,106
Howard	1,823	59.93%	1,096	36.03%	66	2.17%	49	1.61%	8	0.26%	727	23.90%	3,042
Humboldt	1,950	81.76%	369	15.47%	7	0.29%	50	2.10%	9	0.38%	1,581	66.29%	2,385
Ida	1,565	60.66%	940	36.43%	10	0.39%	39	1.51%	26	1.01%	625	24.22%	2,580
Iowa	2,303	52.81%	1,891	43.36%	35	0.80%	111	2.55%	21	0.48%	412	9.45%	4,361
Jackson	2,899	52.33%	2,483	44.82%	114	2.06%	33	0.60%	11	0.20%	416	7.51%	5,540
Jasper	3,962	62.39%	1,942	30.58%	250	3.94%	162	2.55%	34	0.54%	2,020	31.81%	6,350
Jefferson	2,330	62.23%	1,172	31.30%	32	0.85%	194	5.18%	16	0.43%	1,158	30.93%	3,744
Johnson	2,963	48.27%	3,085	50.25%	31	0.50%	43	0.70%	17	0.28%	-122	-1.99%	6,139
Jones	2,833	59.17%	1,834	38.30%	19	0.40%	91	1.90%	11	0.23%	999	20.86%	4,788
Keokuk	3,079	55.82%	2,172	39.38%	98	1.78%	152	2.76%	15	0.27%	907	16.44%	5,516
Kossuth	3,001	68.02%	1,352	30.64%	12	0.27%	39	0.88%	8	0.18%	1,649	37.38%	4,412
Lee	4,612	52.71%	3,848	43.98%	148	1.69%	93	1.06%	48	0.55%	764	8.73%	8,749
Linn	8,131	65.36%	3,600	28.94%	339	2.73%	307	2.47%	63	0.51%	4,531	36.42%	12,440
Louisa	2,147	72.61%	663	22.42%	37	1.25%	83	2.81%	27	0.91%	1,484	50.19%	2,957
Lucas	2,259	65.73%	878	25.55%	126	3.67%	146	4.25%	28	0.81%	1,381	40.18%	3,437
Lyon	1,802	65.05%	841	30.36%	97	3.50%	26	0.94%	4	0.14%	961	34.69%	2,770
Madison	2,602	63.20%	1,190	28.90%	127	3.08%	167	4.06%	31	0.75%	1,412	34.30%	4,117
Mahaska	4,091	59.57%	2,287	33.30%	162	2.36%	278	4.05%	49	0.71%	1,804	26.27%	6,867
Marion	2,988	53.05%	2,202	39.10%	234	4.15%	191	3.39%	17	0.30%	786	13.96%	5,632
Marshall	4,229	66.74%	1,203	18.98%	459	7.24%	422	6.66%	24	0.38%	3,026	47.75%	6,337
Mills	2,252	61.06%	1,274	34.54%	43	1.17%	83	2.25%	36	0.98%	978	26.52%	3,688
Mitchell	2,158	74.93%	634	22.01%	31	1.08%	51	1.77%	6	0.21%	1,524	52.92%	2,880
Monona	2,274	64.80%	1,016	28.95%	48	1.37%	97	2.76%	74	2.11%	1,258	35.85%	3,509
Monroe	3,249	62.17%	1,182	22.62%	617	11.81%	139	2.66%	39	0.75%	2,067	39.55%	5,226
Montgomery	2,956	75.25%	722	18.38%	99	2.52%	104	2.65%	47	1.20%	2,234	56.87%	3,928
Muscatine	4,036	57.04%	2,555	36.11%	397	5.61%	73	1.03%	15	0.21%	1,481	20.93%	7,076
O'Brien	2,279	68.94%	885	26.77%	94	2.84%	45	1.36%	3	0.09%	1,394	42.17%	3,306
Osceola	1,179	67.37%	554	31.66%	2	0.11%	13	0.74%	2	0.11%	625	35.71%	1,750
Page	3,463	71.21%	944	19.41%	142	2.92%	289	5.94%	25	0.51%	2,519	51.80%	4,863
Palo Alto	1,999	63.32%	1,081	34.24%	36	1.14%	27	0.86%	14	0.44%	918	29.08%	3,157
Plymouth	2,905	61.47%	1,663	35.19%	38	0.80%	112	2.37%	8	0.17%	1,242	26.28%	4,726
Pocahontas	1,924	66.32%	841	28.99%	62	2.14%	63	2.17%	11	0.38%	1,083	37.33%	2,901
Polk	14,113	72.53%	3,086	15.86%	1,651	8.48%	555	2.85%	53	0.27%	11,027	56.67%	19,458
Pottawattamie	6,868	61.14%	3,731	33.21%	375	3.34%	197	1.75%	62	0.55%	3,137	27.93%	11,233
Poweshiek	3,137	67.48%	1,212	26.07%	63	1.36%	197	4.24%	40	0.86%	1,925	41.41%	4,649
Ringgold	2,200	69.38%	835	26.33%	22	0.69%	96	3.03%	18	0.57%	1,365	43.05%	3,171
Sac	2,609	72.43%	835	23.18%	49	1.36%	100	2.78%	9	0.25%	1,774	49.25%	3,602
Scott	6,789	51.96%	4,931	37.74%	1,240	9.49%	88	0.67%	18	0.14%	1,858	14.22%	13,066
Shelby	2,310	57.69%	1,584	39.56%	38	0.95%	55	1.37%	17	0.42%	726	18.13%	4,004
Sioux	2,992	70.83%	1,151	27.25%	28	0.66%	33	0.78%	20	0.47%	1,841	43.58%	4,224
Story	3,919	78.74%	752	15.11%	66	1.33%	230	4.62%	10	0.20%	3,167	63.63%	4,977
Tama	3,127	55.12%	2,360	41.60%	66	1.16%	110	1.94%	10	0.18%	767	13.52%	5,673
Taylor	2,650	65.90%	1,060	26.36%	84	2.09%	189	4.70%	38	0.95%	1,590	39.54%	4,021
Union	2,674	62.16%	1,322	30.73%	88	2.05%	185	4.30%	33	0.77%	1,352	31.43%	4,302
Van Buren	2,469	61.51%	1,416	35.28%	26	0.65%	84	2.09%	19	0.47%	1,053	26.23%	4,014
Wapello	4,912	60.60%	2,473	30.51%	564	6.96%	99	1.22%	57	0.70%	2,439	30.09%	8,105
Warren	2,938	66.20%	1,191	26.84%	45	1.01%	245	5.52%	19	0.43%	1,747	39.36%	4,438
Washington	2,875	59.24%	1,772	36.51%	29	0.60%	156	3.21%	21	0.43%	1,103	22.73%	4,853
Wayne	2,290	56.11%	1,452	35.58%	122	2.99%	192	4.70%	25	0.61%	838	20.53%	4,081
Webster	4,358	66.87%	1,714	26.30%	200	3.07%	216	3.31%	29	0.44%	2,644	40.57%	6,517
Winnebago	2,002	89.45%	174	7.77%	11	0.49%	41	1.83%	10	0.45%	1,828	81.68%	2,238
Winneshiek	3,383	68.96%	1,467	29.90%	9	0.18%	41	0.84%	6	0.12%	1,916	39.05%	4,906
Woodbury	7,597	66.85%	2,809	24.72%	629	5.54%	277	2.44%	52	0.46%	4,788	42.13%	11,364
Worth	1,659	81.97%	307	15.17%	24	1.19%	28	1.38%	6	0.30%	1,352	66.80%	2,024
Wright	2,795	77.38%	695	19.24%	31	0.86%	77	2.13%	14	0.39%	2,100	58.14%	3,612
Totals	307,907	63.39%	149,141	30.71%	14,847	3.06%	11,601	2.39%	2,207	0.45%	158,766	32.69%	485,703

== See also ==
- United States presidential elections in Iowa
