= 1884 United States presidential election in Iowa =

- November 4, 1884
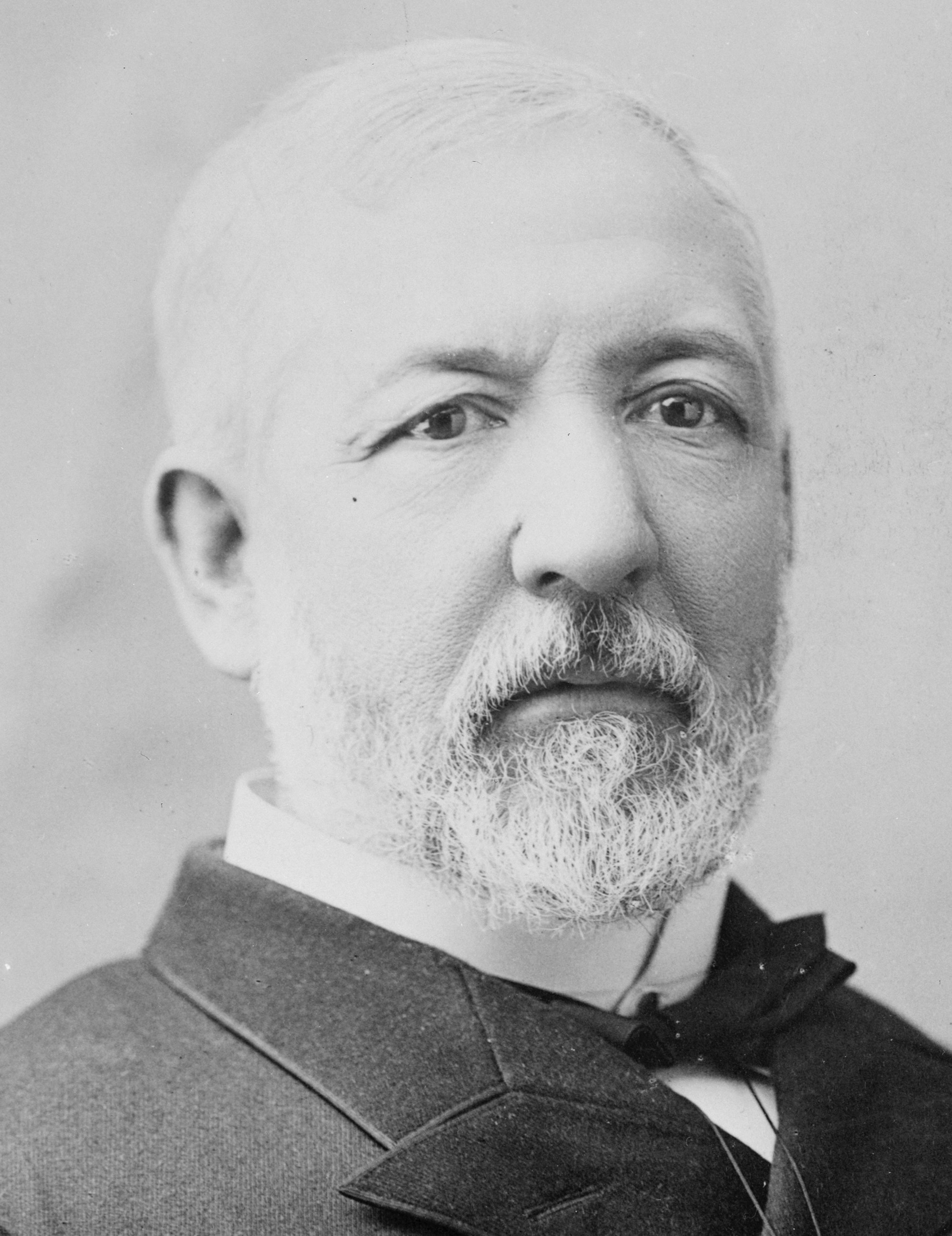

Nominee	James G. Blaine	Grover Cleveland
Party	Republican	Democratic
Home state	Maine	New York
Running mate	John A. Logan	Thomas A. Hendricks
Electoral vote	13	0
Popular vote	197,089	177,316
Percentage	52.25%	47.01%
County results
Blaine
40–50%
50–60%
60–70%
70–80%
80–90%
Cleveland
40–50%
50–60%
60–70%
President before election
Chester A. Arthur
Republican
Elected President
Grover Cleveland
Democratic

The 1884 United States presidential election in Iowa took place on November 4, 1884. All contemporary 38 states were part of the 1884 United States presidential election. State voters chose 13 electors to the Electoral College, which selected the president and vice president.

Iowa was won by Secretary of State James G. Blaine (R-Maine), running with Senator John A. Logan, with 52.25% of the vote, against Grover Cleveland, the 28th governor of New York, (D–New York), running with the former governor of Indiana Thomas A. Hendricks, with 47.01% of the popular vote.

The Prohibition party chose the 8th Governor of Kansas, John St. John and Maryland State Representative William Daniel, received 0.40% of the popular vote.

== Results ==
1884 United States presidential election in Iowa
Party	Candidate	Votes	Percentage	Electoral votes
Republican	James G. Blaine	197,089	52.25%	13
Democratic	Grover Cleveland	177,316	47.01%	0
Prohibition	John St. John	1,499	0.40%	0
No party	Write-ins	1,297	0.34%	0

=== Results by county ===
County	James Gillespie Blaine Republican		Stephen Grover Cleveland Democratic		Various candidates Other parties		Margin		Total votes cast
County	#	%	#	%	#	%	#	%	Total votes cast
Adair	1,814	56.71%	1,371	42.86%	14	0.44%	443	13.85%	3,199
Adams	1,362	49.98%	1,359	49.87%	4	0.15%	3	0.11%	2,725
Allamakee	1,732	46.45%	1,995	53.50%	2	0.05%	-263	-7.05%	3,729
Appanoose	1,724	48.95%	1,792	50.88%	6	0.17%	-68	-1.93%	3,522
Audubon	1,222	50.12%	1,216	49.88%	0	0.00%	6	0.25%	2,438
Benton	2,657	52.15%	2,436	47.81%	2	0.04%	221	4.34%	5,095
Black Hawk	3,153	60.21%	2,084	39.79%	0	0.00%	1,069	20.41%	5,237
Boone	2,616	54.12%	2,205	45.61%	13	0.27%	411	8.50%	4,834
Bremer	1,699	53.11%	1,493	46.67%	7	0.22%	206	6.44%	3,199
Buchanan	2,216	53.33%	1,923	46.28%	16	0.39%	293	7.05%	4,155
Buena Vista	1,413	62.08%	854	37.52%	9	0.40%	559	24.56%	2,276
Butler	2,011	61.29%	1,256	38.28%	14	0.43%	755	23.01%	3,281
Calhoun	1,434	67.04%	692	32.35%	13	0.61%	742	34.69%	2,139
Carroll	1,490	41.85%	2,062	57.92%	8	0.22%	-572	-16.07%	3,560
Cass	2,195	51.43%	2,062	48.31%	11	0.26%	133	3.12%	4,268
Cedar	2,180	52.33%	1,941	46.59%	45	1.08%	239	5.74%	4,166
Cerro Gordo	1,697	64.21%	935	35.38%	11	0.42%	762	28.83%	2,643
Cherokee	1,645	64.21%	892	34.82%	25	0.98%	753	29.39%	2,562
Chickasaw	1,425	46.54%	1,621	52.94%	16	0.52%	-196	-6.40%	3,062
Clarke	1,310	83.12%	207	13.13%	59	3.74%	1,103	69.99%	1,576
Clay	1,024	73.30%	356	25.48%	17	1.22%	668	47.82%	1,397
Clayton	2,536	43.97%	3,219	55.81%	13	0.23%	-683	-11.84%	5,768
Clinton	3,243	40.72%	4,585	57.56%	137	1.72%	-1,342	-16.85%	7,965
Crawford	1,506	45.46%	1,789	54.00%	18	0.54%	-283	-8.54%	3,313
Dallas	2,636	52.95%	2,034	40.86%	308	6.19%	602	12.09%	4,978
Davis	1,145	34.87%	2,139	65.13%	0	0.00%	-994	-30.27%	3,284
Decatur	1,748	52.12%	1,596	47.58%	10	0.30%	152	4.53%	3,354
Delaware	2,243	56.30%	1,741	43.70%	0	0.00%	502	12.60%	3,984
Des Moines	2,929	42.41%	3,950	57.19%	28	0.41%	-1,021	-14.78%	6,907
Dickinson	542	71.69%	212	28.04%	2	0.26%	330	43.65%	756
Dubuque	3,246	34.96%	6,033	64.98%	6	0.06%	-2,787	-30.02%	9,285
Emmet	385	79.22%	100	20.58%	1	0.21%	285	58.64%	486
Fayette	2,607	51.37%	2,421	47.70%	47	0.93%	186	3.67%	5,075
Floyd	1,941	57.96%	1,395	41.65%	13	0.39%	546	16.30%	3,349
Franklin	1,600	68.49%	736	31.51%	0	0.00%	864	36.99%	2,336
Fremont	1,820	47.45%	2,000	52.14%	16	0.42%	-180	-4.69%	3,836
Greene	1,918	55.24%	1,524	43.89%	30	0.86%	394	11.35%	3,472
Grundy	1,469	59.38%	1,005	40.62%	0	0.00%	464	18.76%	2,474
Guthrie	2,175	58.45%	1,517	40.77%	29	0.78%	658	17.68%	3,721
Hamilton	1,653	61.00%	1,057	39.00%	0	0.00%	596	21.99%	2,710
Hancock	691	65.56%	361	34.25%	2	0.19%	330	31.31%	1,054
Hardin	2,550	66.22%	1,293	33.58%	8	0.21%	1,257	32.64%	3,851
Harrison	2,384	50.73%	2,283	48.58%	32	0.68%	101	2.15%	4,699
Henry	2,377	56.68%	1,797	42.85%	20	0.48%	580	13.83%	4,194
Howard	1,083	53.85%	912	45.35%	16	0.80%	171	8.50%	2,011
Humboldt	1,043	64.86%	559	34.76%	6	0.37%	484	30.10%	1,608
Ida	1,257	57.61%	917	42.03%	8	0.37%	340	15.58%	2,182
Iowa	1,602	43.29%	2,083	56.28%	16	0.43%	-481	-13.00%	3,701
Jackson	1,957	38.77%	3,076	60.94%	15	0.30%	-1,119	-22.17%	5,048
Jasper	2,997	51.77%	2,734	47.23%	58	1.00%	263	4.54%	5,789
Jefferson	2,012	53.14%	1,707	45.09%	67	1.77%	305	8.06%	3,786
Johnson	2,019	38.71%	3,151	60.41%	46	0.88%	-1,132	-21.70%	5,216
Jones	2,503	54.08%	2,109	45.57%	16	0.35%	394	8.51%	4,628
Keokuk	2,493	47.66%	2,712	51.84%	26	0.50%	-219	-4.19%	5,231
Kossuth	1,044	58.82%	728	41.01%	3	0.17%	316	17.80%	1,775
Lee	3,285	43.81%	4,204	56.06%	10	0.13%	-919	-12.25%	7,499
Linn	4,840	52.48%	4,306	46.69%	77	0.83%	534	5.79%	9,223
Louisa	1,742	59.88%	1,104	37.95%	63	2.17%	638	21.93%	2,909
Lucas	1,802	56.45%	1,384	43.36%	6	0.19%	418	13.10%	3,192
Lyon	609	70.40%	249	28.79%	7	0.81%	360	41.62%	865
Madison	1,930	49.56%	1,809	46.46%	155	3.98%	121	3.11%	3,894
Mahaska	3,409	54.12%	2,837	45.04%	53	0.84%	572	9.08%	6,299
Marion	2,356	47.27%	2,593	52.03%	35	0.70%	-237	-4.76%	4,984
Marshall	3,394	61.22%	2,115	38.15%	35	0.63%	1,279	23.07%	5,544
Mills	1,650	50.94%	1,589	49.06%	0	0.00%	61	1.88%	3,239
Mitchell	1,509	58.02%	1,077	41.41%	15	0.58%	432	16.61%	2,601
Monona	1,330	52.20%	1,208	47.41%	10	0.39%	122	4.79%	2,548
Monroe	1,374	49.34%	1,406	50.48%	5	0.18%	-32	-1.15%	2,785
Montgomery	2,134	60.16%	1,387	39.10%	26	0.73%	747	21.06%	3,547
Muscatine	2,567	47.62%	2,808	52.09%	16	0.30%	-241	-4.47%	5,391
O'Brien	1,195	64.98%	640	34.80%	4	0.22%	555	30.18%	1,839
Osceola	640	72.48%	243	27.52%	0	0.00%	397	44.96%	883
Page	2,761	57.06%	1,671	34.53%	407	8.41%	1,090	22.53%	4,839
Palo Alto	650	49.17%	671	50.76%	1	0.08%	-21	-1.59%	1,322
Plymouth	1,648	48.90%	1,710	50.74%	12	0.36%	-62	-1.84%	3,370
Pocahontas	774	60.90%	497	39.10%	0	0.00%	277	21.79%	1,271
Polk	6,122	56.06%	4,768	43.66%	30	0.27%	1,354	12.40%	10,920
Pottawattamie	4,348	49.50%	4,436	50.50%	0	0.00%	-88	-1.00%	8,784
Poweshiek	2,295	54.81%	1,861	44.45%	31	0.74%	434	10.37%	4,187
Ringgold	1,677	57.02%	1,096	37.27%	168	5.71%	581	19.76%	2,941
Sac	1,782	61.58%	1,110	38.36%	2	0.07%	672	23.22%	2,894
Scott	2,740	34.31%	5,200	65.11%	47	0.59%	-2,460	-30.80%	7,987
Shelby	1,802	50.82%	1,741	49.10%	3	0.08%	61	1.72%	3,546
Sioux	1,351	59.67%	905	39.97%	8	0.35%	446	19.70%	2,264
Story	2,314	65.42%	1,212	34.27%	11	0.31%	1,102	31.16%	3,537
Tama	2,478	53.37%	2,147	46.24%	18	0.39%	331	7.13%	4,643
Taylor	2,034	56.72%	1,535	42.81%	17	0.47%	499	13.92%	3,586
Union	1,821	50.74%	1,741	48.51%	27	0.75%	80	2.23%	3,589
Van Buren	1,944	50.69%	1,813	47.28%	78	2.03%	131	3.42%	3,835
Wapello	2,984	50.22%	2,958	49.78%	0	0.00%	26	0.44%	5,942
Warren	2,166	53.97%	1,818	45.30%	29	0.72%	348	8.67%	4,013
Washington	2,419	53.79%	2,041	45.39%	37	0.82%	378	8.41%	4,497
Wayne	1,672	49.47%	1,681	49.73%	27	0.80%	-9	-0.27%	3,380
Webster	2,023	50.54%	1,980	49.46%	0	0.00%	43	1.07%	4,003
Winnebago	690	75.74%	216	23.71%	5	0.55%	474	52.03%	911
Winneshiek	2,453	55.29%	1,974	44.49%	10	0.23%	479	10.80%	4,437
Woodbury	2,789	53.78%	2,380	45.89%	17	0.33%	409	7.89%	5,186
Worth	899	64.63%	487	35.01%	5	0.36%	412	29.62%	1,391
Wright	1,313	65.62%	688	34.38%	0	0.00%	625	31.23%	2,001
Totals	197,088	52.22%	177,523	47.04%	2,796	0.74%	19,565	5.18%	377,407

== See also ==
- United States presidential elections in Iowa
