= 1868 United States presidential election in Iowa =

- November 3, 1868
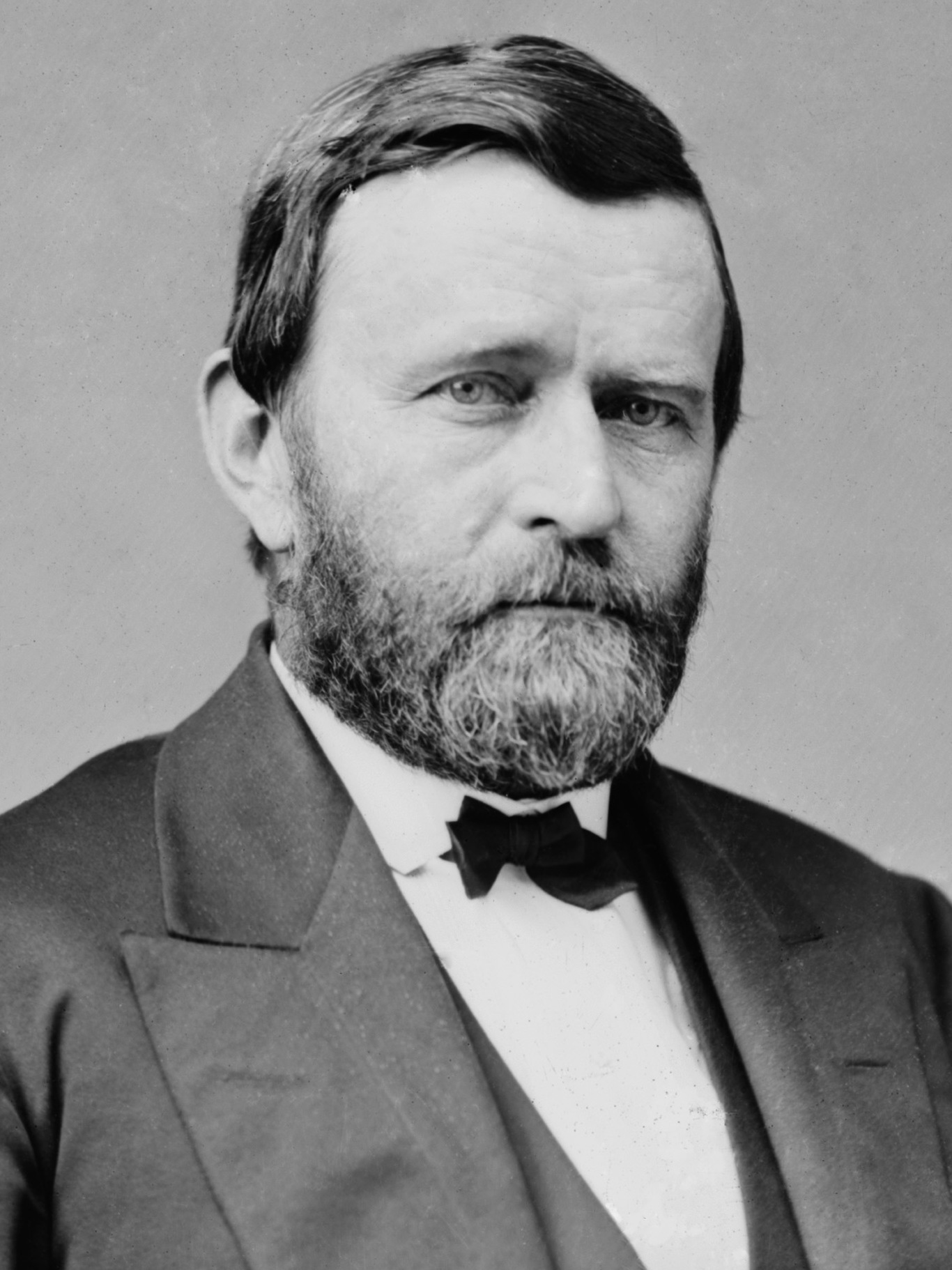

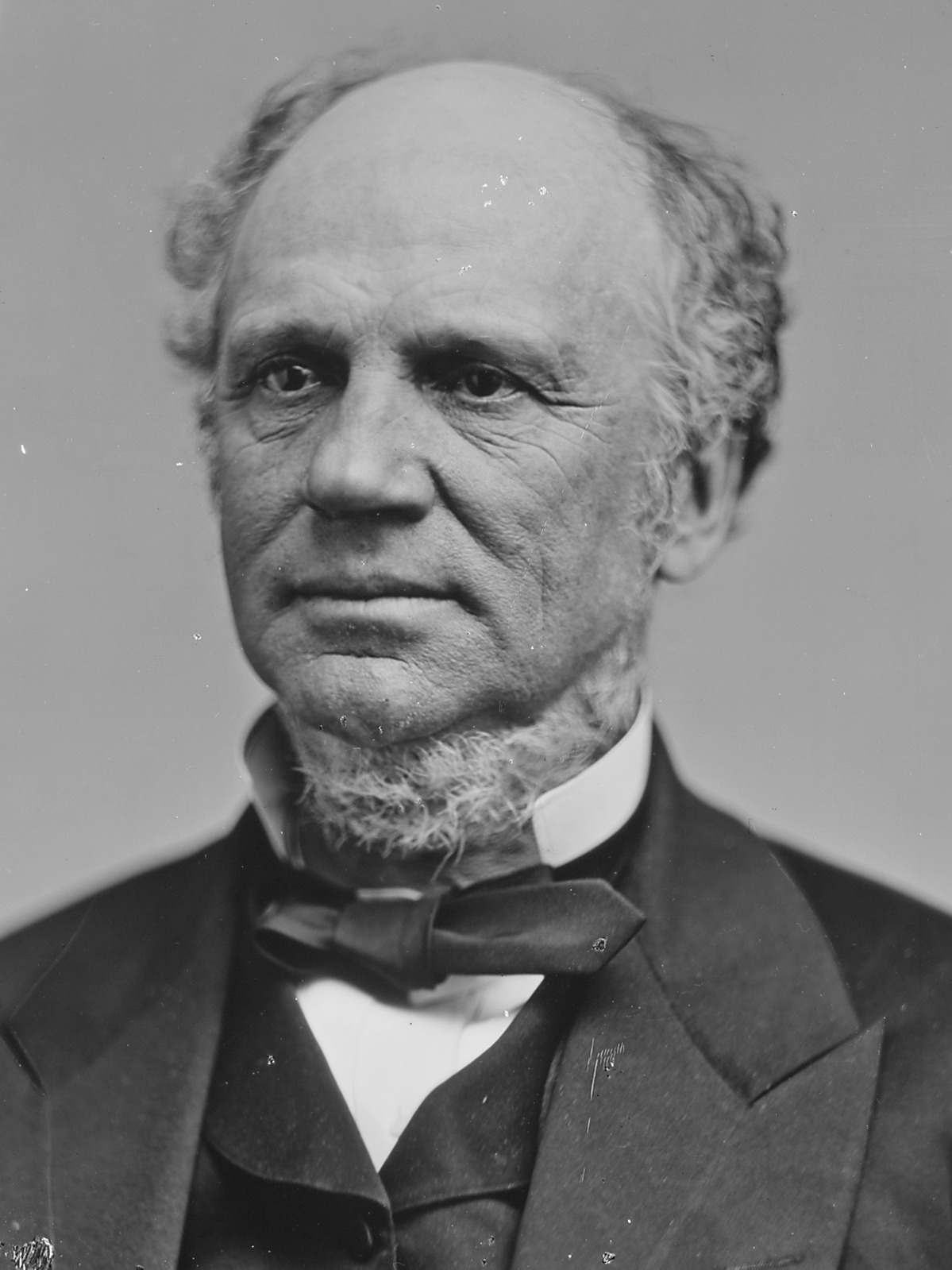
Nominee	Ulysses S. Grant	Horatio Seymour
Party	Republican	Democratic
Home state	Illinois	New York
Running mate	Schuyler Colfax	Francis Preston Blair Jr.
Electoral vote	8	0
Popular vote	120,399	74,040
Percentage	61.92%	38.08%
County results
Grant
50–60%
60–70%
70–80%
80–90%
90–100%
Seymour
50–60%
60–70%
Tie
~50%
President before election
Andrew Johnson
Democratic
Elected President
Ulysses S. Grant
Republican

The 1868 United States presidential election in Iowa took place on November 3, 1868, as part of the 1868 United States presidential election. Voters chose eight representatives, or electors to the Electoral College, who voted for president and vice president.

Iowa voted for the Republican nominee, Ulysses S. Grant, over the Democratic nominee, Horatio Seymour. Grant won the state by a margin of 23.84%.

== Results ==
1868 United States presidential election in Iowa
Party	Candidate	Running mate	Popular vote		Electoral vote	
Party	Candidate	Running mate	Count	%	Count	%
Republican	Ulysses S. Grant of Illinois	Schuyler Colfax of Indiana	120,399	61.92%	8	100.00%
Democratic	Horatio Seymour of New York	Francis Preston Blair Jr. of Missouri	74,040	38.08%	0	0.00%
Total			194,439	100.00%	8	100.00%

== See also ==
- United States presidential elections in Iowa
