= 1876 United States presidential election in Iowa =

- November 7, 1876
- Turnout: 24.57% ▲6.45 pp
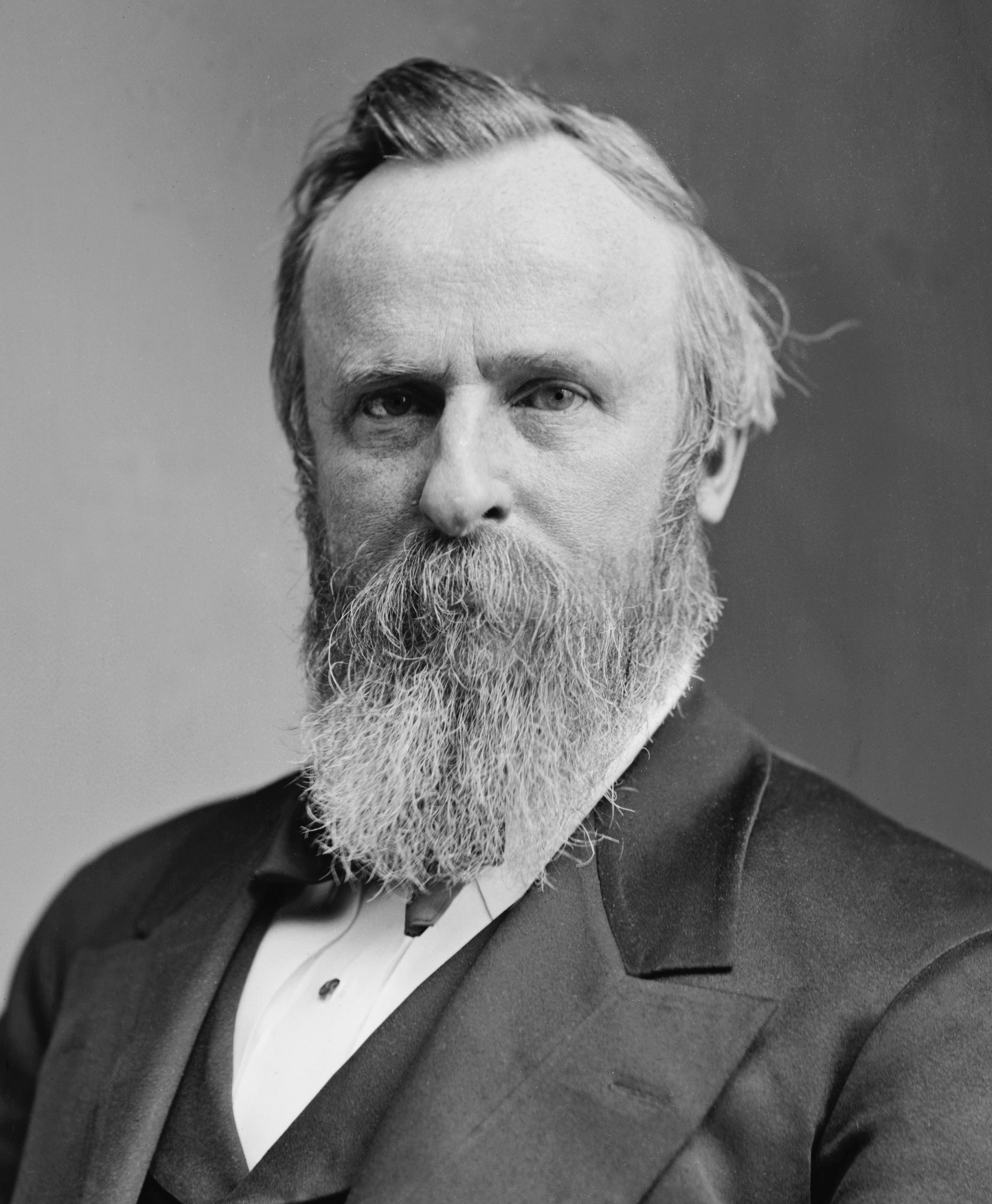

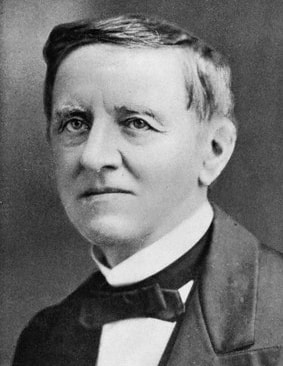
Nominee	Rutherford B. Hayes	Samuel J. Tilden
Party	Republican	Democratic
Home state	Ohio	New York
Running mate	William A. Wheeler	Thomas A. Hendricks
Electoral vote	11	0
Popular vote	171,326	112,121
Percentage	58.50%	38.28%
County results
Hayes
40–50%
50–60%
60–70%
70–80%
80–90%
90–100%
Tilden
40–50%
50–60%
60–70%
President before election
Ulysses S. Grant
Republican
Elected President
Rutherford B. Hayes
Republican

The 1876 United States presidential election in Iowa took place on November 7, 1876, as part of the 1876 United States presidential election. Voters chose 11 representatives, or electors, to the Electoral College, who voted for president and vice president.

Iowa was won by Rutherford B. Hayes, the governor of Ohio (R-Ohio), running with Representative William A. Wheeler, with 58.50% of the vote, against Samuel J. Tilden, the former governor of New York (D–New York), running with Thomas A. Hendricks, the governor of Indiana and future vice president, with 38.28% of the popular vote.

The Greenback Party chose industrialist Peter Cooper and former representative Samuel Fenton Cary, received 3.22% of the vote. Iowa gave the Greenbacks both their largest number of total votes and percentage and Iowa would later be the last bastion of the congressional Greenbacks who held a House seat until 1889.

== Results ==
1876 United States presidential election in Iowa
Party	Candidate	Running mate	Popular vote		Electoral vote	
Party	Candidate	Running mate	Count	%	Count	%
Republican	Rutherford B. Hayes of Ohio	William A. Wheeler of New York	171,326	58.50%	11	100.00%
Democratic	Samuel J. Tilden of New York	Thomas A. Hendricks of Indiana	112,121	38.28%	0	0.00%
Greenback	Peter Cooper of New York	Samuel Fenton Cary of Ohio	9,431	3.22%	0	0.00%
Total			292,878	100.00%	11	100.00%

== See also ==
- United States presidential elections in Iowa
