= 1860 United States presidential election in Iowa =

- November 6, 1860
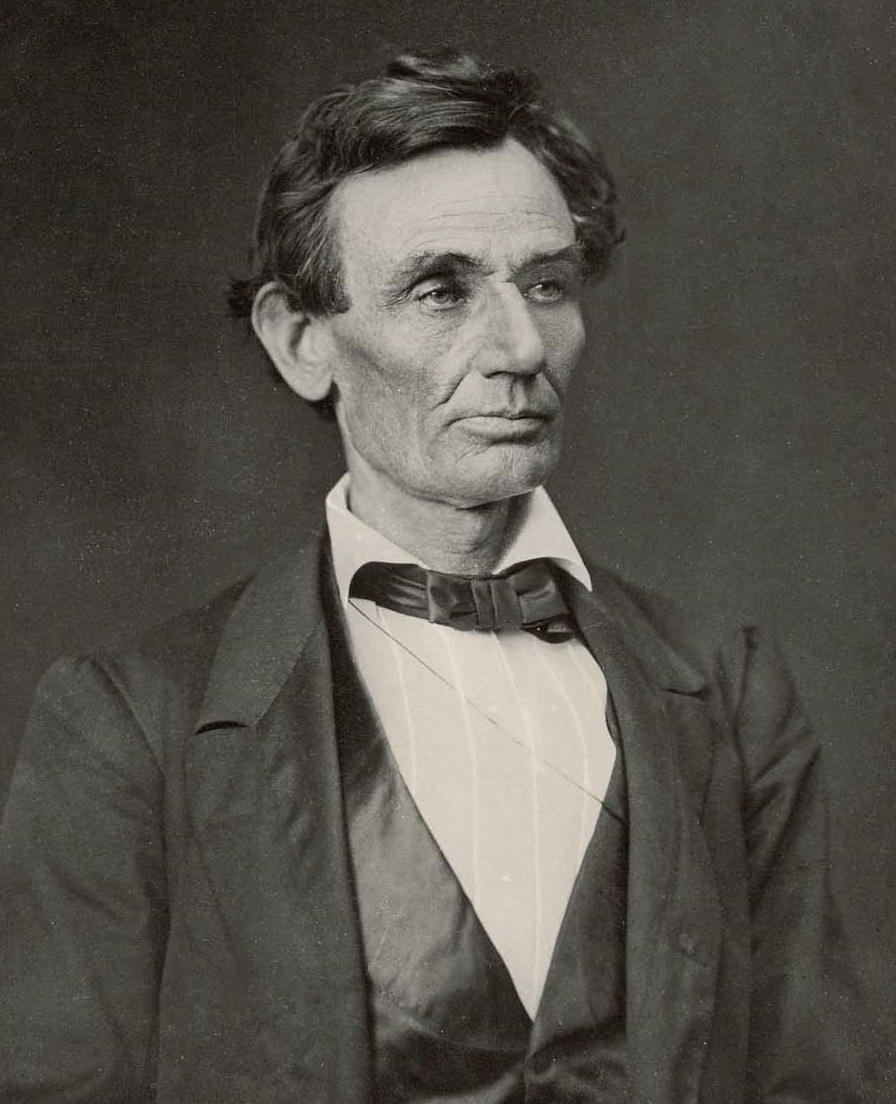

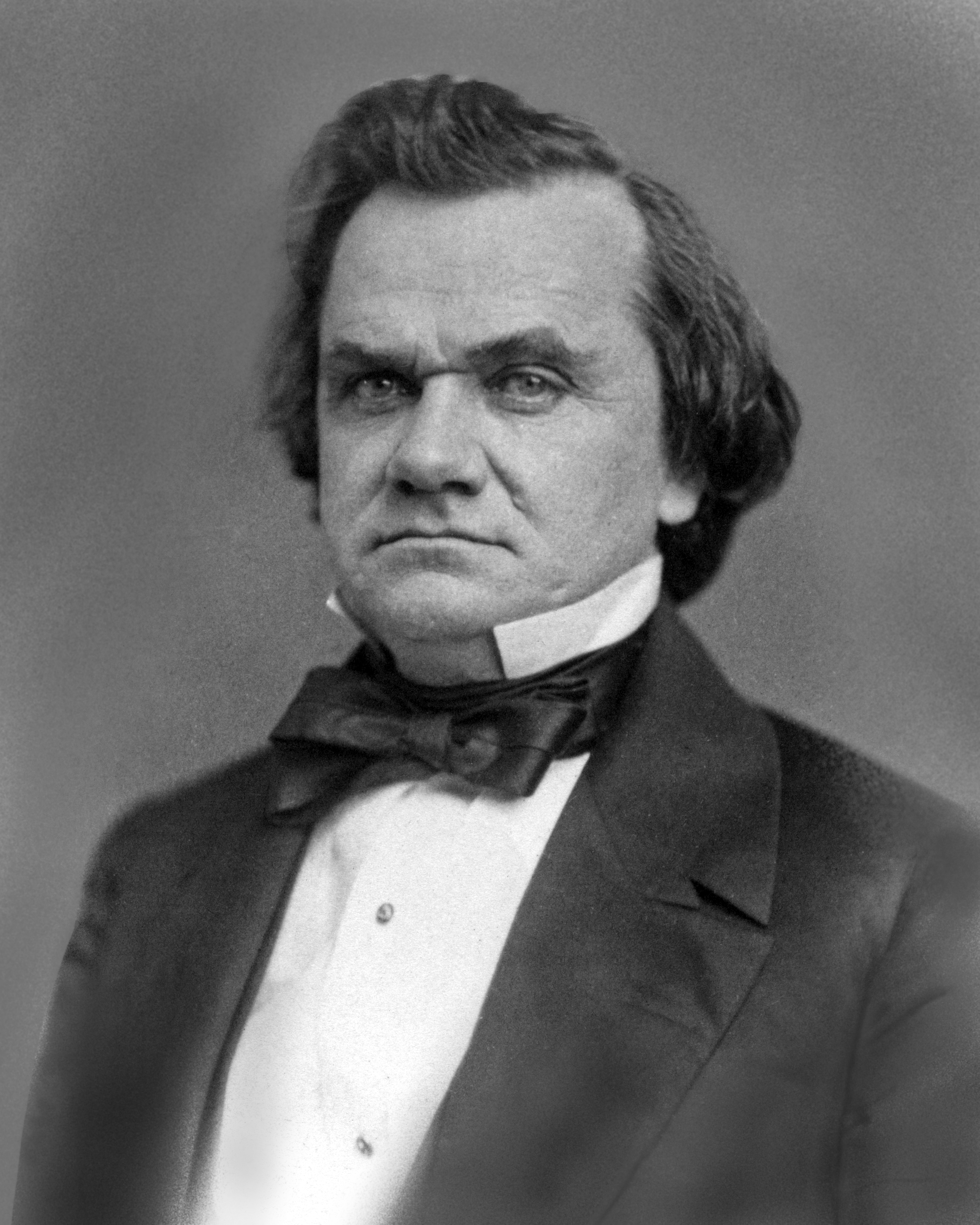
Nominee	Abraham Lincoln	Stephen A. Douglas
Party	Republican	Democratic
Home state	Illinois	Illinois
Running mate	Hannibal Hamlin	Herschel V. Johnson
Electoral vote	4	0
Popular vote	70,302	55,639
Percentage	54.61%	43.22%
County results
Lincoln
40–50%
50–60%
60–70%
70–80%
80–90%
90–100%
Douglas
40–50%
50–60%
60–70%
70–80%
80–90%
Tie
~50%
President before election
James Buchanan
Democratic
Elected President
Abraham Lincoln
Republican

The 1860 United States presidential election in Iowa took place on November 6, 1860, as part of the 1860 United States presidential election. Iowa voters chose four representatives, or electors, to the Electoral College, who voted for president and vice president.

Iowa was won by the Republican nominees Illinois Representative Abraham Lincoln and his running mate Senator Hannibal Hamlin of Maine. They defeated the Democratic nominees Senator Stephen A. Douglas of Illinois and his running mate 41st Governor of Georgia Herschel V. Johnson. Lincoln won the state by a margin of 11.39%.

== Results ==
1860 United States presidential election in Iowa
Party	Candidate	Votes	%
Republican	Abraham Lincoln	70,302	54.61%
Democratic	Stephen A. Douglas	55,639	43.22%
Constitutional Union	John Bell	1,763	1.37%
Southern Democratic	John C. Breckinridge	1,035	0.80%
Total votes		128,739	100%

=== Results By County ===
1860 United States Presidential Election in Iowa (By County)
County	Abraham Lincoln Republican		Stephen A. Douglas Democratic		Various candidates Other parties		Total votes cast
County	#	%	#	%	#	%	Total votes cast
Adair	42	47.73%	44	50.00%	2	2.27%	88
Adams	161	63.64%	92	36.36%	0	0.00%	253
Allamakee	1,185	50.43%	1,151	48.98%	14	0.60%	2,350
Appanoose	853	39.90%	1,224	57.25%	61	2.85%	2,138
Audubon	48	44.86%	59	55.14%	0	0.00%	107
Benton	1,028	58.44%	724	41.16%	7	0.40%	1,759
Black Hawk	1,122	66.00%	557	32.76%	21	1.24%	1,700
Boone	365	44.95%	446	54.93%	1	0.12%	812
Bremer	543	53.50%	454	44.73%	18	1.77%	1,015
Butler	483	66.16%	246	33.70%	1	0.14%	730
Buchanan	962	60.35%	621	38.96%	11	0.69%	1,594
Buena Vista	6	50.00%	6	50.00%	0	0.00%	12
Calhoun	19	48.72%	20	51.28%	0	0.00%	39
Carroll	25	49.02%	26	50.98%	0	0.00%	51
Cass	167	54.22%	136	44.16%	5	1.62%	308
Cedar	1,548	60.83%	963	37.84%	34	1.34%	2,545
Cerro Gordo	157	69.78%	59	26.22%	9	4.00%	225
Cherokee	10	76.92%	3	23.08%	0	0.00%	13
Chickasaw	550	64.18%	306	35.71%	1	0.12%	857
Clay	8	38.10%	13	61.90%	0	0.00%	21
Clarke	592	57.09%	445	42.91%	0	0.00%	1,037
Clayton	2,089	56.74%	1,574	42.75%	19	0.52%	3,682
Clinton	1,974	56.00%	1,450	41.13%	101	2.87%	3,525
Crawford	47	60.26%	31	39.74%	0	0.00%	78
Dallas	612	57.90%	433	40.96%	12	1.14%	1,057
Davis	843	33.48%	1,424	56.55%	251	9.97%	2,518
Decatur	680	42.79%	898	56.51%	11	0.69%	1,589
Delaware	1,268	60.96%	789	37.93%	23	1.11%	2,080
Des Moines	1,997	52.01%	1,677	43.67%	166	4.32%	3,840
Dickinson	46	86.79%	7	13.21%	0	0.00%	53
Dubuque	2,092	39.70%	3,059	58.05%	119	2.26%	5,270
Emmet	36	100.00%	0	0.00%	0	0.00%	36
Fayette	1,527	64.51%	835	35.28%	5	0.21%	2,367
Floyd	560	71.43%	201	25.64%	23	2.93%	784
Franklin	228	76.77%	69	23.23%	0	0.00%	297
Fremont	402	40.85%	516	52.44%	66	6.71%	984
Greene	121	45.49%	145	54.51%	0	0.00%	266
Grundy	141	88.13%	19	11.88%	0	0.00%	160
Guthrie	326	51.58%	306	48.42%	0	0.00%	632
Hamilton	224	66.08%	100	29.50%	15	4.42%	339
Hancock	29	87.88%	4	12.12%	0	0.00%	33
Harrison	385	51.40%	357	47.66%	7	0.93%	749
Hardin	713	64.82%	382	34.73%	5	0.45%	1,100
Henry	2,148	65.49%	1,066	32.50%	66	2.01%	3,280
Howard	386	58.57%	273	41.43%	0	0.00%	659
Humboldt	55	75.34%	8	10.96%	10	13.70%	73
Ida	4	40.00%	6	60.00%	0	0.00%	10
Iowa	782	53.02%	682	46.24%	11	0.75%	1,475
Jackson	1,574	50.18%	1,505	47.98%	58	1.85%	3,137
Jasper	1,208	62.85%	650	33.82%	64	3.33%	1,922
Jefferson	1,463	53.20%	1,245	45.27%	42	1.53%	2,750
Johnson	1,804	53.23%	1,448	42.73%	137	4.04%	3,389
Jones	1,453	56.45%	1,097	42.62%	24	0.93%	2,574
Keokuk	1,330	52.34%	1,195	47.03%	16	0.63%	2,541
Kossuth	64	78.05%	18	21.95%	0	0.00%	82
Lee	2,617	48.41%	2,632	48.69%	157	2.90%	5,406
Linn	2,226	61.51%	1,289	35.62%	104	2.87%	3,619
Louisa	586	52.84%	483	43.55%	40	3.61%	1,109
Lucas	1,309	63.67%	739	35.94%	8	0.39%	2,056
Madison	737	48.52%	764	50.30%	18	1.18%	1,519
Mahaska	1,639	54.82%	1,332	44.55%	19	0.64%	2,990
Marion	1,508	47.87%	1,607	51.02%	35	1.11%	3,150
Marshall	854	67.09%	403	31.66%	16	1.26%	1,273
Mills	441	55.96%	327	41.50%	20	2.54%	788
Mitchell	594	76.94%	172	22.28%	6	0.78%	772
Monona	109	54.50%	89	44.50%	2	1.00%	200
Monroe	879	53.24%	749	45.37%	23	1.39%	1,651
Montgomery	152	62.04%	81	33.06%	12	4.90%	245
Muscatine	1,840	55.44%	1,285	38.72%	194	5.85%	3,319
O'Brien	8	38.10%	10	47.62%	3	14.29%	21
Page	469	59.29%	290	36.66%	32	4.05%	791
Palo Alto	4	12.12%	29	87.88%	0	0.00%	33
Plymouth	32	84.21%	6	15.79%	0	0.00%	38
Pocahontas	31	75.61%	10	24.39%	0	0.00%	41
Polk	1,303	53.49%	1,074	44.09%	59	2.42%	2,436
Pottawattamie	413	46.77%	410	46.43%	60	6.80%	883
Poweshuck	721	59.73%	484	40.10%	2	0.17%	1,207
Ringgold	348	65.29%	182	34.15%	3	0.56%	533
Sac	15	27.78%	39	72.22%	0	0.00%	54
Scott	2,739	63.55%	1,377	31.95%	194	4.50%	4,310
Shelby	100	60.98%	64	39.02%	0	0.00%	164
Sioux	3	20.00%	10	66.67%	2	13.33%	15
Story	418	55.66%	333	44.34%	0	0.00%	751
Tama	775	64.96%	413	34.62%	5	0.42%	1,193
Taylor	353	58.06%	248	40.79%	7	1.15%	608
Union	198	48.77%	208	51.23%	0	0.00%	406
Van Buren	1,667	50.59%	1,552	47.10%	76	2.31%	3,295
Wapello	1,399	44.48%	1,686	53.61%	60	1.91%	3,145
Warren	1,152	57.92%	795	39.97%	42	2.11%	1,989
Washington	1,721	60.32%	1,052	36.87%	80	2.80%	2,853
Wayne	579	46.81%	648	52.38%	10	0.81%	1,237
Webster	253	49.22%	207	40.27%	54	10.51%	514
Winneshiek	1,382	63.92%	780	36.08%	0	0.00%	2,162
Winnebago	24	53.33%	21	46.67%	0	0.00%	45
Woodbury	129	49.81%	117	45.17%	13	5.02%	259
Worth	109	78.42%	30	21.58%	0	0.00%	139
Wright (Note: No vote for Wright County in the manuscript returns. These returns were located in W. Dean Burnham's Presidential Ballots.)	90	70.87%	23	18.11%	14	11.02%	127
Total	70,316	54.85%	55,091	42.97%	2,801	2.18%	128,208

== See also ==
- United States presidential elections in Iowa
