= 1900 United States presidential election in Iowa =

- November 6, 1900
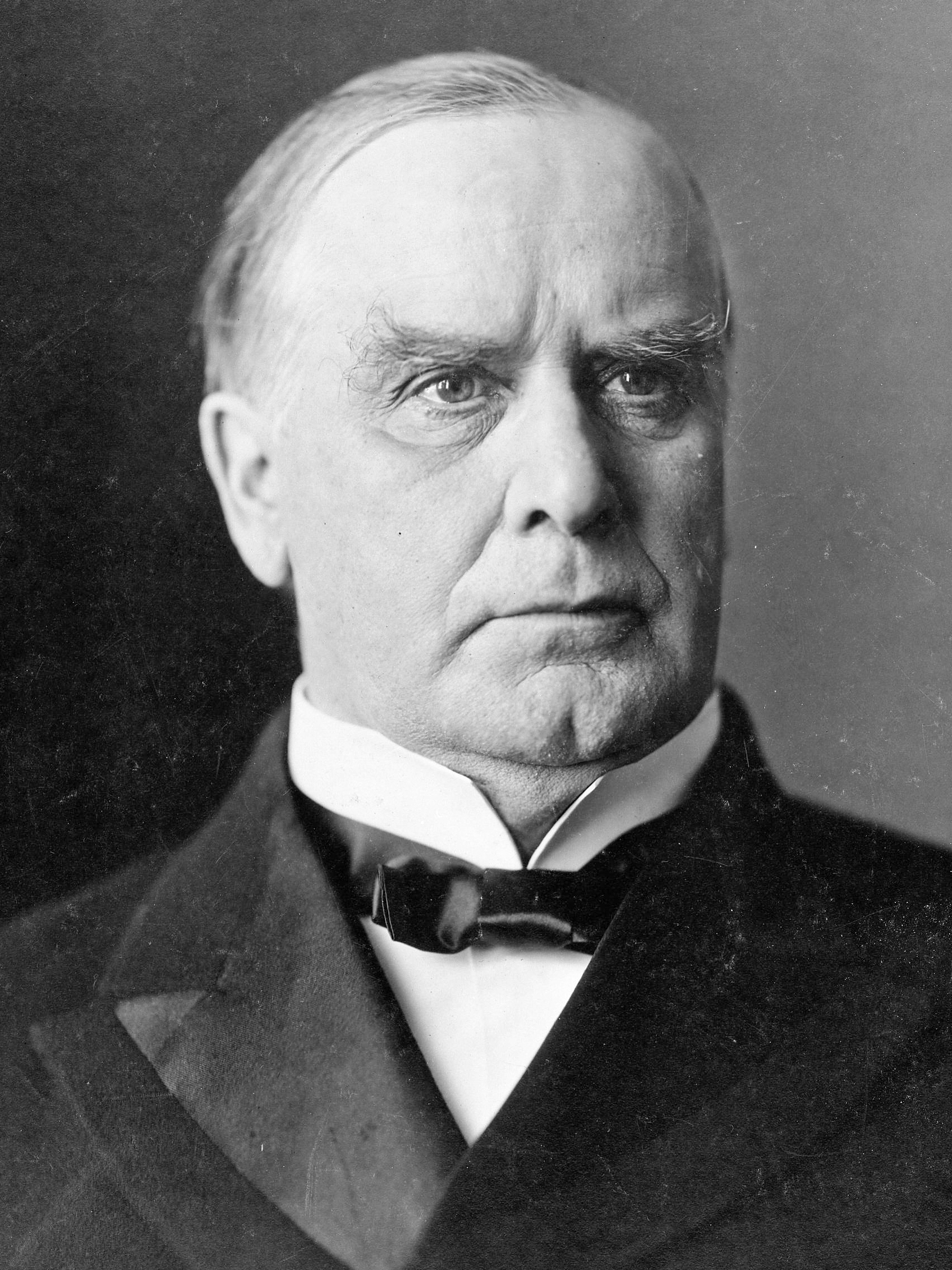

Nominee	William McKinley	William Jennings Bryan
Party	Republican	Democratic
Home state	Ohio	Nebraska
Running mate	Theodore Roosevelt	Adlai Stevenson I
Electoral vote	13	0
Popular vote	307,808	209,265
Percentage	58.04%	39.46%
County results
McKinley
40–50%
50–60%
60–70%
70–80%
Bryan
50–60%
Tie
40–50%
President before election
William McKinley
Republican
Elected President
William McKinley
Republican

The 1900 United States presidential election in Iowa took place on November 6, 1900. All contemporary 45 states were part of the 1900 United States presidential election. Voters chose 13 electors to the Electoral College, which selected the president and vice president.

Iowa was won by the Republican incumbent President William McKinley of Ohio and his running mate Theodore Roosevelt of New York. They defeated the Democratic nominees, former U.S. Representative and 1896 Democratic presidential nominee William Jennings Bryan and his running mate, former Vice President Adlai Stevenson I. McKinley won the state by a margin of 18.58% in this rematch of the 1896 presidential election. The return of economic prosperity and recent victory in the Spanish–American War helped McKinley to score a decisive victory.

Bryan had previous lost Iowa to McKinley four years earlier and would later lose the state again in 1908 to William Howard Taft.

== Results ==
1900 United States presidential election in Iowa
Party	Candidate	Votes	Percentage	Electoral votes
Republican	William McKinley (incumbent)	307,808	58.04%	13
Democratic	William Jennings Bryan	209,265	39.46%	0
Prohibition	John G. Woolley	9,502	1.79%	0
Social Democratic	Eugene V. Debs	2,742	0.52%	0
Populist	Wharton Barker	613	0.12%	0
Socialist Labor	Joseph F. Malloney	259	0.05%	0
United Christian	Jonah Leonard	166	0.03%	0
Totals		530,355	100.00%	13
Voter turnout				—

=== Results by county ===
County	William McKinley Republican		William Jennings Bryan Democratic		John Granville Woolley Prohibition		Eugene Victor Debs Social Democratic		Various candidates Other parties		Margin		Total votes cast
County	#	%	#	%	#	%	#	%	#	%	#	%	Total votes cast
Adair	2,327	57.86%	1,618	40.23%	60	1.49%	7	0.17%	10	0.25%	709	17.63%	4,022
Adams	1,873	55.22%	1,428	42.10%	82	2.42%	2	0.06%	7	0.21%	445	13.12%	3,392
Allamakee	2,659	58.47%	1,850	40.68%	30	0.66%	3	0.07%	6	0.13%	809	17.79%	4,548
Appanoose	3,538	55.52%	2,690	42.22%	33	0.52%	102	1.60%	9	0.14%	848	13.31%	6,372
Audubon	1,821	57.86%	1,301	41.34%	23	0.73%	0	0.00%	2	0.06%	520	16.52%	3,147
Benton	3,609	56.89%	2,575	40.59%	101	1.59%	57	0.90%	2	0.03%	1,034	16.30%	6,344
Black Hawk	5,010	64.39%	2,512	32.28%	237	3.05%	13	0.17%	9	0.12%	2,498	32.10%	7,781
Boone	4,151	61.60%	2,264	33.60%	205	3.04%	112	1.66%	7	0.10%	1,887	28.00%	6,739
Bremer	2,178	52.46%	1,929	46.46%	40	0.96%	2	0.05%	3	0.07%	249	6.00%	4,152
Buchanan	2,958	56.96%	2,053	39.53%	171	3.29%	3	0.06%	8	0.15%	905	17.43%	5,193
Buena Vista	2,632	71.27%	936	25.35%	98	2.65%	5	0.14%	22	0.60%	1,696	45.92%	3,693
Butler	2,902	70.01%	1,167	28.15%	70	1.69%	3	0.07%	3	0.07%	1,735	41.86%	4,145
Calhoun	2,973	69.61%	1,224	28.66%	67	1.57%	6	0.14%	1	0.02%	1,749	40.95%	4,271
Carroll	2,224	47.34%	2,434	51.81%	29	0.62%	8	0.17%	3	0.06%	-210	-4.47%	4,698
Cass	3,128	60.12%	2,010	38.63%	40	0.77%	4	0.08%	21	0.40%	1,118	21.49%	5,203
Cedar	2,740	55.19%	2,131	42.92%	88	1.77%	4	0.08%	2	0.04%	609	12.27%	4,965
Cerro Gordo	3,345	69.53%	1,320	27.44%	132	2.74%	11	0.23%	3	0.06%	2,025	42.09%	4,811
Cherokee	2,432	63.10%	1,253	32.51%	156	4.05%	0	0.00%	13	0.34%	1,179	30.59%	3,854
Chickasaw	2,085	49.71%	2,063	49.19%	37	0.88%	3	0.07%	6	0.14%	22	0.52%	4,194
Clarke	1,800	56.69%	1,322	41.64%	47	1.48%	2	0.06%	4	0.13%	478	15.06%	3,175
Clay	2,292	72.76%	781	24.79%	64	2.03%	3	0.10%	10	0.32%	1,511	47.97%	3,150
Clayton	3,366	53.07%	2,884	45.47%	68	1.07%	17	0.27%	7	0.11%	482	7.60%	6,342
Clinton	5,344	51.19%	4,758	45.58%	63	0.60%	218	2.09%	56	0.54%	586	5.61%	10,439
Crawford	2,268	45.72%	2,578	51.97%	107	2.16%	2	0.04%	6	0.12%	-310	-6.25%	4,961
Dallas	3,601	62.35%	1,940	33.59%	172	2.98%	51	0.88%	11	0.19%	1,661	28.76%	5,775
Davis	1,656	42.76%	2,155	55.64%	41	1.06%	2	0.05%	19	0.49%	-499	-12.88%	3,873
Decatur	2,415	53.21%	2,058	45.34%	42	0.93%	6	0.13%	18	0.40%	357	7.87%	4,539
Delaware	2,805	63.02%	1,570	35.27%	54	1.21%	17	0.38%	5	0.11%	1,235	27.75%	4,451
Des Moines	4,315	50.72%	3,909	45.94%	73	0.86%	188	2.21%	23	0.27%	406	4.77%	8,508
Dickinson	1,352	73.16%	445	24.08%	43	2.33%	6	0.32%	2	0.11%	907	49.08%	1,848
Dubuque	4,752	41.09%	6,655	57.55%	56	0.48%	75	0.65%	26	0.22%	-1,903	-16.46%	11,564
Emmet	1,618	70.59%	595	25.96%	71	3.10%	4	0.17%	4	0.17%	1,023	44.63%	2,292
Fayette	3,984	58.39%	2,708	39.69%	117	1.71%	0	0.00%	14	0.21%	1,276	18.70%	6,823
Floyd	2,843	67.56%	1,295	30.77%	57	1.35%	1	0.02%	12	0.29%	1,548	36.79%	4,208
Franklin	2,537	76.37%	748	22.52%	32	0.96%	2	0.06%	3	0.09%	1,789	53.85%	3,322
Fremont	2,170	46.59%	2,399	51.50%	73	1.57%	3	0.06%	13	0.28%	-229	-4.92%	4,658
Greene	2,777	65.88%	1,360	32.27%	72	1.71%	3	0.07%	3	0.07%	1,417	33.62%	4,215
Grundy	2,025	61.79%	1,203	36.71%	43	1.31%	4	0.12%	2	0.06%	822	25.08%	3,277
Guthrie	2,806	59.52%	1,824	38.69%	74	1.57%	5	0.11%	5	0.11%	982	20.83%	4,714
Hamilton	3,259	73.15%	1,134	25.45%	44	0.99%	10	0.22%	8	0.18%	2,125	47.70%	4,455
Hancock	2,186	71.32%	827	26.98%	50	1.63%	1	0.03%	1	0.03%	1,359	44.34%	3,065
Hardin	3,741	72.63%	1,268	24.62%	125	2.43%	8	0.16%	9	0.17%	2,473	48.01%	5,151
Harrison	3,303	52.50%	2,837	45.10%	106	1.68%	37	0.59%	8	0.13%	466	7.41%	6,291
Henry	2,794	57.64%	1,907	39.34%	125	2.58%	10	0.21%	11	0.23%	887	18.30%	4,847
Howard	1,944	56.30%	1,420	41.12%	85	2.46%	3	0.09%	1	0.03%	524	15.18%	3,453
Humboldt	2,214	77.88%	595	20.93%	29	1.02%	0	0.00%	5	0.18%	1,619	56.95%	2,843
Ida	1,599	54.22%	1,304	44.22%	40	1.36%	4	0.14%	2	0.07%	295	10.00%	2,949
Iowa	2,336	52.70%	1,983	44.73%	92	2.08%	12	0.27%	10	0.23%	353	7.96%	4,433
Jackson	2,964	50.66%	2,854	48.78%	30	0.51%	1	0.02%	2	0.03%	110	1.88%	5,851
Jasper	3,894	54.14%	3,163	43.97%	98	1.36%	21	0.29%	17	0.24%	731	10.16%	7,193
Jefferson	2,482	58.73%	1,612	38.14%	118	2.79%	9	0.21%	5	0.12%	870	20.59%	4,226
Johnson	3,010	48.10%	3,182	50.85%	46	0.74%	15	0.24%	5	0.08%	-172	-2.75%	6,258
Jones	3,021	58.72%	2,052	39.88%	72	1.40%	0	0.00%	0	0.00%	969	18.83%	5,145
Keokuk	3,339	54.32%	2,669	43.42%	120	1.95%	11	0.18%	8	0.13%	670	10.90%	6,147
Kossuth	3,122	63.06%	1,777	35.89%	46	0.93%	3	0.06%	3	0.06%	1,345	27.17%	4,951
Lee	4,486	45.88%	5,182	53.00%	77	0.79%	19	0.19%	14	0.14%	-696	-7.12%	9,778
Linn	7,745	59.10%	5,019	38.30%	236	1.80%	87	0.66%	19	0.14%	2,726	20.80%	13,106
Louisa	2,185	63.30%	1,172	33.95%	82	2.38%	11	0.32%	2	0.06%	1,013	29.35%	3,452
Lucas	2,225	57.58%	1,488	38.51%	127	3.29%	21	0.54%	3	0.08%	737	19.07%	3,864
Lyon	1,666	55.00%	1,289	42.56%	50	1.65%	21	0.69%	3	0.10%	377	12.45%	3,029
Madison	2,590	55.67%	1,907	40.99%	75	1.61%	9	0.19%	71	1.53%	683	14.68%	4,652
Mahaska	4,480	53.90%	3,596	43.26%	201	2.42%	23	0.28%	12	0.14%	884	10.64%	8,312
Marion	2,950	48.53%	2,950	48.53%	153	2.52%	7	0.12%	19	0.31%	0	0.00%	6,079
Marshall	4,878	65.07%	2,329	31.07%	257	3.43%	27	0.36%	5	0.07%	2,549	34.00%	7,496
Mills	2,212	55.00%	1,733	43.09%	67	1.67%	3	0.07%	7	0.17%	479	11.91%	4,022
Mitchell	2,450	70.40%	981	28.19%	47	1.35%	1	0.03%	1	0.03%	1,469	42.21%	3,480
Monona	2,161	51.53%	1,934	46.11%	79	1.88%	4	0.10%	16	0.38%	227	5.41%	4,194
Monroe	2,233	51.62%	1,705	39.41%	148	3.42%	218	5.04%	22	0.51%	528	12.21%	4,326
Montgomery	2,927	65.25%	1,467	32.70%	83	1.85%	4	0.09%	5	0.11%	1,460	32.55%	4,486
Muscatine	3,905	54.92%	3,021	42.49%	68	0.96%	108	1.52%	8	0.11%	884	12.43%	7,110
O'Brien	2,386	61.16%	1,461	37.45%	45	1.15%	7	0.18%	2	0.05%	925	23.71%	3,901
Osceola	1,106	56.89%	799	41.10%	28	1.44%	6	0.31%	5	0.26%	307	15.79%	1,944
Page	3,424	60.68%	1,889	33.48%	313	5.55%	8	0.14%	9	0.16%	1,535	27.20%	5,643
Palo Alto	1,908	55.47%	1,477	42.94%	50	1.45%	2	0.06%	3	0.09%	431	12.53%	3,440
Plymouth	2,712	53.03%	2,307	45.11%	85	1.66%	5	0.10%	5	0.10%	405	7.92%	5,114
Pocahontas	2,176	61.84%	1,287	36.57%	53	1.51%	1	0.03%	2	0.06%	889	25.26%	3,519
Polk	12,628	64.72%	6,180	31.67%	460	2.36%	198	1.01%	45	0.23%	6,448	33.05%	19,511
Pottawattamie	6,525	54.14%	5,373	44.58%	101	0.84%	25	0.21%	28	0.23%	1,152	9.56%	12,052
Poweshiek	3,199	63.05%	1,765	34.79%	88	1.73%	12	0.24%	10	0.20%	1,434	28.26%	5,074
Ringgold	2,319	62.19%	1,311	35.16%	79	2.12%	7	0.19%	13	0.35%	1,008	27.03%	3,729
Sac	2,786	67.38%	1,214	29.36%	124	3.00%	8	0.19%	3	0.07%	1,572	38.02%	4,135
Scott	6,327	52.05%	5,157	42.43%	66	0.54%	540	4.44%	65	0.53%	1,170	9.63%	12,155
Shelby	2,182	51.47%	2,010	47.42%	32	0.75%	8	0.19%	7	0.17%	172	4.06%	4,239
Sioux	3,025	61.70%	1,809	36.90%	52	1.06%	7	0.14%	10	0.20%	1,216	24.80%	4,903
Story	4,032	71.91%	1,343	23.95%	222	3.96%	8	0.14%	2	0.04%	2,689	47.96%	5,607
Tama	3,290	53.45%	2,736	44.45%	117	1.90%	7	0.11%	5	0.08%	554	9.00%	6,155
Taylor	2,792	57.25%	1,984	40.68%	92	1.89%	5	0.10%	4	0.08%	808	16.57%	4,877
Union	2,462	50.86%	2,218	45.82%	148	3.06%	3	0.06%	10	0.21%	244	5.04%	4,841
Van Buren	2,547	56.40%	1,893	41.92%	65	1.44%	5	0.11%	6	0.13%	654	14.48%	4,516
Wapello	4,742	53.21%	3,902	43.78%	85	0.95%	142	1.59%	41	0.46%	840	9.43%	8,912
Warren	2,966	59.15%	1,876	37.42%	157	3.13%	3	0.06%	12	0.24%	1,090	21.74%	5,014
Washington	2,844	54.26%	2,234	42.63%	153	2.92%	3	0.06%	7	0.13%	610	11.64%	5,241
Wayne	2,294	51.78%	2,001	45.17%	132	2.98%	0	0.00%	3	0.07%	293	6.61%	4,430
Webster	4,221	63.31%	2,266	33.99%	133	1.99%	29	0.43%	18	0.27%	1,955	29.32%	6,667
Winnebago	2,052	79.63%	474	18.39%	41	1.59%	5	0.19%	5	0.19%	1,578	61.23%	2,577
Winneshiek	3,486	64.72%	1,835	34.07%	59	1.10%	3	0.06%	3	0.06%	1,651	30.65%	5,386
Woodbury	7,045	57.54%	4,796	39.17%	357	2.92%	26	0.21%	19	0.16%	2,249	18.37%	12,243
Worth	1,730	77.30%	475	21.22%	28	1.25%	1	0.04%	4	0.18%	1,255	56.08%	2,238
Wright	2,990	75.07%	891	22.37%	93	2.33%	7	0.18%	2	0.05%	2,099	52.70%	3,983
Totals	307,808	58.04%	209,265	39.46%	9,502	1.79%	2,743	0.52%	1,030	0.19%	98,543	18.58%	530,348

== See also ==
- United States presidential elections in Iowa
