= 1900 United States presidential election in Illinois =

- November 6, 1900
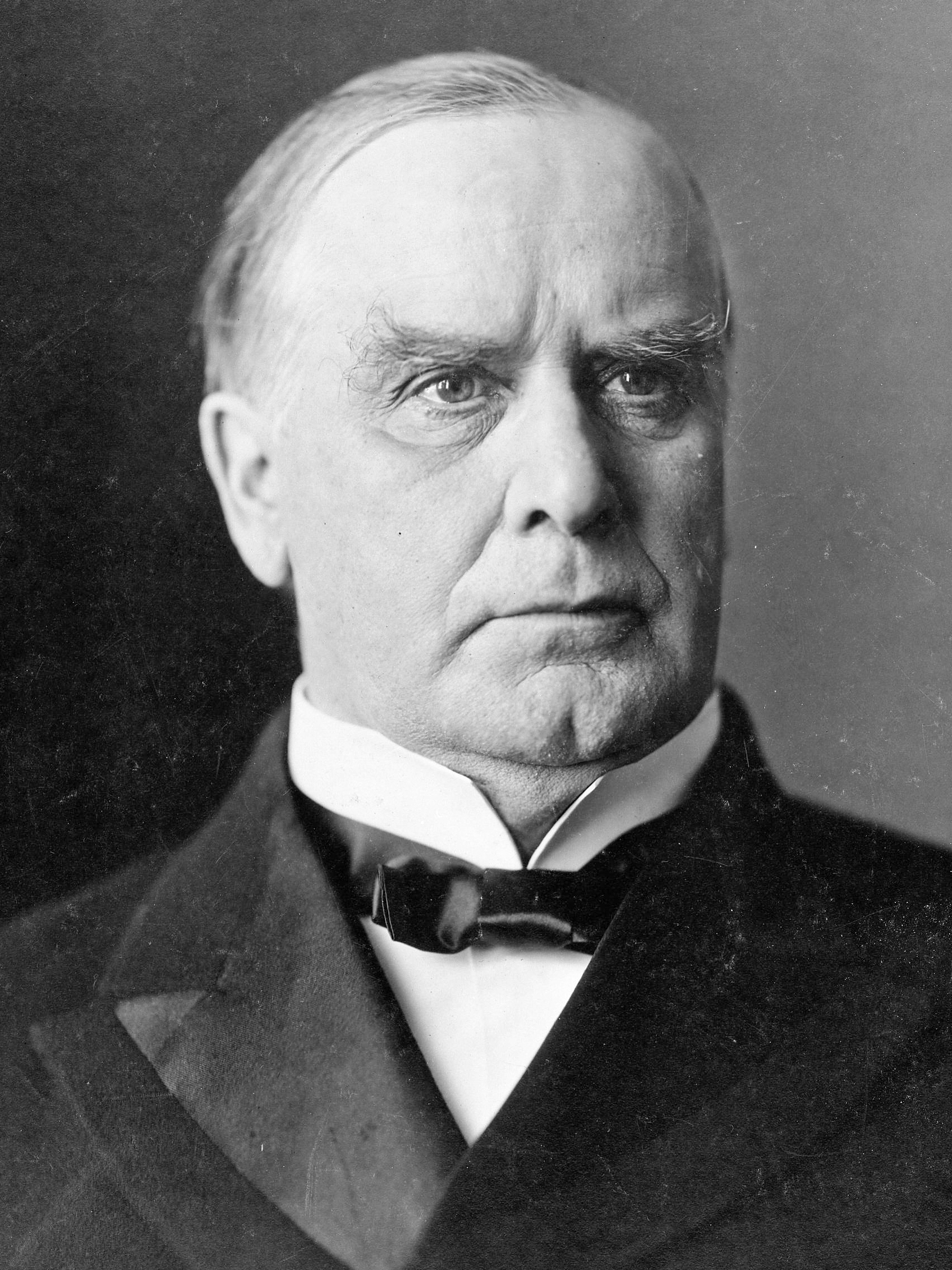

Nominee	William McKinley	William Jennings Bryan
Party	Republican	Democratic
Home state	Ohio	Nebraska
Running mate	Theodore Roosevelt	Adlai Stevenson I
Electoral vote	24	0
Popular vote	597,985	503,061
Percentage	52.83%	44.44%
County results
McKinley
40–50%
50–60%
60–70%
70–80%
Bryan
40–50%
50–60%
60–70%
President before election
William McKinley
Republican
Elected President
William McKinley
Republican

The 1900 United States presidential election in Illinois took place on November 6, 1900. All contemporary 45 states were part of the 1900 United States presidential election. State voters chose 24 electors to the Electoral College, which selected the president and vice president.

Bryan 40–50% 50–60% 60–70% 70–80% 80–90% 90–100% McKinley 40–50% 50–60% 60–70% 70–80% 80–90% 90–100% Tie

Illinois was won by the Republican nominees, incumbent President William McKinley of Ohio and his running mate Theodore Roosevelt of New York. They defeated the Democratic nominees, former U.S. Representative and 1896 Democratic presidential nominee William Jennings Bryan and his running mate, former Vice President Adlai Stevenson I. McKinley won the state by a margin of 8.39% in this rematch of the 1896 presidential election. The return of economic prosperity and recent victory in the Spanish–American War helped McKinley to score a decisive victory.

Illinois was the tipping-point-state in the 1900 presidential election.

Bryan had previous lost Illinois to McKinley four years earlier and would later lose the state again in 1908 to William Howard Taft.

== Results ==
1900 United States presidential election in Illinois
Party	Candidate	Votes	Percentage	Electoral votes
Republican	William McKinley (inc.)	597,985	52.83%	24
Democratic	William Jennings Bryan	503,061	44.44%	0
Prohibition	John G. Woolley	17,626	1.56%	0
Social Democratic	Eugene V. Debs	9,687	0.86%	0
Socialist Labor	Joseph F. Malloney	1,373	0.12%	0
Populist	Wharton Barker	1,141	0.10%	0
Union Reform	Seth H. Ellis	672	0.06%	0
United Christian	Jonah Leonard	352	0.03%	0
Totals		1,131,897	100.00%	24
Voter turnout				—

=== Chicago results ===
1900 United States presidential election in Chicago
Party	Candidate	Votes	Percentage
Republican	William McKinley	184,786	49.66%
Democratic	William Jennings Bryan	177,165	47.61%
Social Democratic	Eugene V. Debs	6,553	1.76%
Prohibition	John G. Woolley	2,997	0.81%
Socialist Labor	Joseph F. Malloney	410	0.11%
Populist	Wharton Barker	185	0.05%
Totals		372,096	100.00%

== See also ==
- United States presidential elections in Illinois
