= 1908 United States presidential election in Illinois =

- November 3, 1908

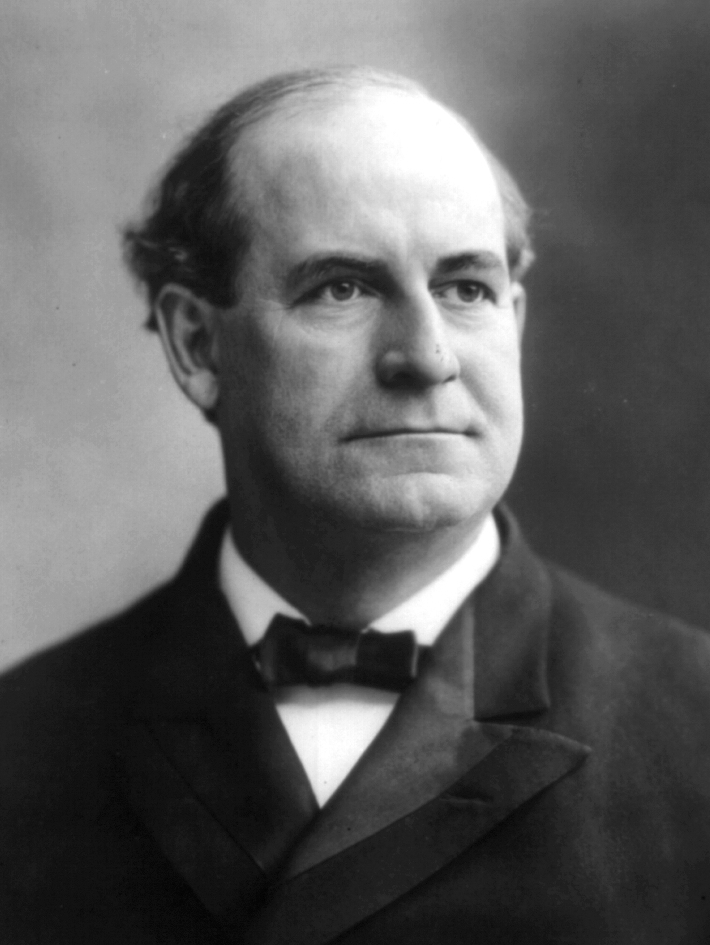
Nominee	William Howard Taft	William Jennings Bryan
Party	Republican	Democratic
Home state	Ohio	Nebraska
Running mate	James S. Sherman	John W. Kern
Electoral vote	27	0
Popular vote	629,932	450,810
Percentage	54.53%	39.02%
County results
Taft
40–50%
50–60%
60–70%
70–80%
Bryan
40–50%
50–60%
60–70%
President before election
Theodore Roosevelt
Republican
Elected President
William Howard Taft
Republican

The 1908 United States presidential election in Illinois took place on November 3, 1908. All contemporary 46 states were part of the 1908 United States presidential election. State voters chose 27 electors to the Electoral College, which selected the president and vice president.

Illinois was won by the Republican nominees, former Secretary of War William Howard Taft of Ohio and his running mate James S. Sherman of New York. They defeated the Democratic nominees, former representative William Jennings Bryan of Nebraska and his running with John W. Kern, a former Indiana state senator. Taft won the state by a margin of 15.51%.

In this election, Illinois voted 6.97% to the right of the nation at-large.

Bryan had previously lost Illinois to William McKinley in both 1896 and 1900.

== Results ==
1908 United States presidential election in Illinois
Party	Candidate	Votes	Percentage	Electoral votes
Republican	William Howard Taft	629,932	54.53%	27
Democratic	William Jennings Bryan	450,810	39.02%	0
Social Democratic	Eugene V. Debs	34,711	3.00%	0
Prohibition	Eugene W. Chafin	29,364	2.54%	0
Independence	Thomas L. Hisgen	7,724	0.67%	0
Socialist Labor	August Gillhaus	1,680	0.15%	0
Populist	Thomas E. Watson	633	0.05%	0
United Christian	Daniel B. Turney	400	0.03%	0
Totals		1,155,254	100.00%	27
Voter turnout				—

=== Chicago results ===
1908 United States presidential election in Chicago
Party	Candidate	Votes	Percentage
Republican	William Howard Taft	193,342	54.54%
Democratic	William Jennings Bryan	136,915	38.63%
Social Democratic	Eugene V. Debs	14,942	4.22%
Independence	Thomas L. Hisgen	4,351	1.23%
Prohibition	Eugene W. Chafin	4,220	1.20%
Others		695	0.20%
Totals		354,465	100.00%

=== Results by county ===
County	William Howard Taft Republican		William Jennings Bryan Democratic		Eugene Victor Debs Social Democratic		Eugene Wilder Chafin Prohibition		Various candidates Other parties		Margin		Total votes cast
County	#	%	#	%	#	%	#	%	#	%	#	%	Total votes cast
Adams	7,233	44.34%	8,294	50.84%	496	3.04%	242	1.48%	49	0.30%	-1,061	-6.50%	16,314
Alexander	3,790	63.85%	2,027	34.15%	56	0.94%	54	0.91%	9	0.15%	1,763	29.70%	5,936
Bond	2,143	53.68%	1,465	36.70%	84	2.10%	289	7.24%	11	0.28%	678	16.98%	3,992
Boone	2,805	76.06%	587	15.92%	127	3.44%	155	4.20%	14	0.38%	2,218	60.14%	3,688
Brown	947	35.83%	1,609	60.88%	11	0.42%	64	2.42%	12	0.45%	-662	-25.05%	2,643
Bureau	5,280	57.48%	2,871	31.25%	424	4.62%	534	5.81%	77	0.84%	2,409	26.22%	9,186
Calhoun	735	42.58%	905	52.43%	8	0.46%	76	4.40%	2	0.12%	-170	-9.85%	1,726
Carroll	2,875	66.71%	1,129	26.19%	67	1.55%	223	5.17%	16	0.37%	1,746	40.51%	4,310
Cass	1,878	42.46%	2,434	55.03%	14	0.32%	90	2.03%	7	0.16%	-556	-12.57%	4,423
Champaign	7,162	57.15%	4,830	38.54%	42	0.34%	472	3.77%	25	0.20%	2,332	18.61%	12,531
Christian	3,686	43.63%	4,156	49.19%	260	3.08%	324	3.83%	23	0.27%	-470	-5.56%	8,449
Clark	3,158	51.26%	2,793	45.33%	18	0.29%	159	2.58%	33	0.54%	365	5.92%	6,161
Clay	2,250	49.53%	2,152	47.37%	42	0.92%	96	2.11%	3	0.07%	98	2.16%	4,543
Clinton	2,104	39.11%	3,016	56.06%	181	3.36%	61	1.13%	18	0.33%	-912	-16.95%	5,380
Coles	4,388	50.83%	3,957	45.84%	58	0.67%	206	2.39%	23	0.27%	431	4.99%	8,632
Cook	230,400	55.51%	152,990	36.86%	18,842	4.54%	5,965	1.44%	6,894	1.66%	77,410	18.65%	415,091
Crawford	3,090	49.42%	2,890	46.23%	42	0.67%	207	3.31%	23	0.37%	200	3.20%	6,252
Cumberland	1,739	47.66%	1,810	49.60%	13	0.36%	81	2.22%	6	0.16%	-71	-1.95%	3,649
DeKalb	5,866	72.50%	1,732	21.41%	97	1.20%	341	4.21%	55	0.68%	4,134	51.09%	8,091
DeWitt	2,628	53.17%	2,155	43.60%	15	0.30%	138	2.79%	7	0.14%	473	9.57%	4,943
Douglas	2,656	55.33%	1,917	39.94%	11	0.23%	192	4.00%	24	0.50%	739	15.40%	4,800
DuPage	4,530	63.98%	1,975	27.90%	77	1.09%	449	6.34%	49	0.69%	2,555	36.09%	7,080
Edgar	3,757	50.46%	3,433	46.11%	50	0.67%	189	2.54%	16	0.21%	324	4.35%	7,445
Edwards	1,614	64.48%	747	29.84%	14	0.56%	120	4.79%	8	0.32%	867	34.64%	2,503
Effingham	1,877	38.86%	2,826	58.51%	29	0.60%	91	1.88%	7	0.14%	-949	-19.65%	4,830
Fayette	3,261	48.67%	3,193	47.66%	31	0.46%	203	3.03%	12	0.18%	68	1.01%	6,700
Ford	2,617	65.59%	1,164	29.17%	10	0.25%	178	4.46%	21	0.53%	1,453	36.42%	3,990
Franklin	2,539	48.52%	2,401	45.88%	152	2.90%	121	2.31%	20	0.38%	138	2.64%	5,233
Fulton	6,077	50.54%	4,906	40.80%	568	4.72%	405	3.37%	69	0.57%	1,171	9.74%	12,025
Gallatin	1,411	41.77%	1,845	54.62%	34	1.01%	81	2.40%	7	0.21%	-434	-12.85%	3,378
Greene	2,004	37.19%	3,159	58.62%	49	0.91%	166	3.08%	11	0.20%	-1,155	-21.43%	5,389
Grundy	3,127	63.08%	1,359	27.42%	207	4.18%	190	3.83%	74	1.49%	1,768	35.67%	4,957
Hamilton	1,809	44.26%	2,128	52.07%	30	0.73%	110	2.69%	10	0.24%	-319	-7.81%	4,087
Hancock	3,781	45.47%	4,260	51.23%	38	0.46%	226	2.72%	10	0.12%	-479	-5.76%	8,315
Hardin	813	52.52%	680	43.93%	9	0.58%	45	2.91%	1	0.06%	133	8.59%	1,548
Henderson	1,547	62.23%	820	32.98%	12	0.48%	102	4.10%	5	0.20%	727	29.24%	2,486
Henry	6,387	64.53%	2,499	25.25%	438	4.43%	478	4.83%	95	0.96%	3,888	39.28%	9,897
Iroquois	4,855	58.94%	2,966	36.01%	67	0.81%	314	3.81%	35	0.42%	1,889	22.93%	8,237
Jackson	4,016	53.07%	3,149	41.61%	145	1.92%	234	3.09%	24	0.32%	867	11.46%	7,568
Jasper	1,860	43.01%	2,317	53.57%	7	0.16%	131	3.03%	10	0.23%	-457	-10.57%	4,325
Jefferson	3,210	47.30%	3,377	49.76%	33	0.49%	133	1.96%	34	0.50%	-167	-2.46%	6,787
Jersey	1,460	43.17%	1,818	53.76%	26	0.77%	71	2.10%	7	0.21%	-358	-10.59%	3,382
Jo Daviess	3,132	54.57%	2,310	40.25%	94	1.64%	184	3.21%	19	0.33%	822	14.32%	5,739
Johnson	1,913	62.27%	1,055	34.34%	20	0.65%	81	2.64%	3	0.10%	858	27.93%	3,072
Kane	12,840	70.29%	4,316	23.63%	311	1.70%	618	3.38%	182	1.00%	8,524	46.66%	18,267
Kankakee	5,999	68.46%	2,461	28.08%	74	0.84%	184	2.10%	45	0.51%	3,538	40.37%	8,763
Kendall	1,948	73.87%	556	21.08%	11	0.42%	116	4.40%	6	0.23%	1,392	52.79%	2,637
Knox	7,084	63.83%	3,277	29.53%	320	2.88%	381	3.43%	36	0.32%	3,807	34.30%	11,098
Lake	6,392	68.15%	2,264	24.14%	237	2.53%	352	3.75%	134	1.43%	4,128	44.01%	9,379
LaSalle	11,159	55.59%	7,589	37.81%	705	3.51%	454	2.26%	167	0.83%	3,570	17.78%	20,074
Lawrence	2,197	47.16%	2,253	48.36%	14	0.30%	192	4.12%	3	0.06%	-56	-1.20%	4,659
Lee	4,255	63.50%	2,144	32.00%	37	0.55%	232	3.46%	33	0.49%	2,111	31.50%	6,701
Livingston	5,358	55.84%	3,778	39.37%	73	0.76%	347	3.62%	40	0.42%	1,580	16.47%	9,596
Logan	3,451	47.44%	3,546	48.74%	81	1.11%	172	2.36%	25	0.34%	-95	-1.31%	7,275
Macon	6,643	55.98%	4,615	38.89%	170	1.43%	399	3.36%	39	0.33%	2,028	17.09%	11,866
Macoupin	4,988	42.76%	5,775	49.51%	511	4.38%	340	2.91%	50	0.43%	-787	-6.75%	11,664
Madison	9,463	51.14%	7,812	42.22%	814	4.40%	351	1.90%	63	0.34%	1,651	8.92%	18,503
Marion	3,435	43.14%	4,001	50.24%	270	3.39%	201	2.52%	56	0.70%	-566	-7.11%	7,963
Marshall	1,893	50.13%	1,714	45.39%	48	1.27%	113	2.99%	8	0.21%	179	4.74%	3,776
Mason	1,924	43.49%	2,264	51.18%	24	0.54%	204	4.61%	8	0.18%	-340	-7.69%	4,424
Massac	2,084	73.67%	652	23.05%	7	0.25%	85	3.00%	1	0.04%	1,432	50.62%	2,829
McDonough	3,733	51.05%	3,112	42.56%	84	1.15%	374	5.11%	9	0.12%	621	8.49%	7,312
McHenry	5,331	71.07%	1,887	25.16%	51	0.68%	194	2.59%	38	0.51%	3,444	45.91%	7,501
McLean	8,953	55.88%	5,982	37.33%	197	1.23%	840	5.24%	51	0.32%	2,971	18.54%	16,023
Menard	1,600	45.56%	1,748	49.77%	19	0.54%	135	3.84%	10	0.28%	-148	-4.21%	3,512
Mercer	2,871	57.51%	1,777	35.60%	85	1.70%	231	4.63%	28	0.56%	1,094	21.92%	4,992
Monroe	1,733	52.95%	1,512	46.20%	9	0.27%	15	0.46%	4	0.12%	221	6.75%	3,273
Montgomery	3,782	45.64%	3,909	47.17%	242	2.92%	318	3.84%	36	0.43%	-127	-1.53%	8,287
Morgan	4,019	48.06%	3,993	47.75%	116	1.39%	204	2.44%	31	0.37%	26	0.31%	8,363
Moultrie	1,704	48.44%	1,695	48.18%	19	0.54%	93	2.64%	7	0.20%	9	0.26%	3,518
Ogle	4,848	69.24%	1,761	25.15%	28	0.40%	338	4.83%	27	0.39%	3,087	44.09%	7,002
Peoria	10,828	52.47%	8,898	43.12%	515	2.50%	299	1.45%	95	0.46%	1,930	9.35%	20,635
Perry	2,392	46.27%	2,482	48.01%	67	1.30%	192	3.71%	37	0.72%	-90	-1.74%	5,170
Piatt	2,349	57.96%	1,530	37.75%	12	0.30%	153	3.77%	9	0.22%	819	20.21%	4,053
Pike	2,932	40.36%	3,859	53.12%	185	2.55%	257	3.54%	32	0.44%	-927	-12.76%	7,265
Pope	1,706	67.75%	748	29.71%	6	0.24%	58	2.30%	0	0.00%	958	38.05%	2,518
Pulaski	2,185	65.24%	1,080	32.25%	19	0.57%	56	1.67%	9	0.27%	1,105	32.99%	3,349
Putnam	834	62.99%	413	31.19%	16	1.21%	51	3.85%	10	0.76%	421	31.80%	1,324
Randolph	3,045	47.04%	3,172	49.00%	101	1.56%	151	2.33%	4	0.06%	-127	-1.96%	6,473
Richland	1,684	44.13%	1,938	50.79%	67	1.76%	122	3.20%	5	0.13%	-254	-6.66%	3,816
Rock Island	8,196	55.45%	4,739	32.06%	1,072	7.25%	344	2.33%	430	2.91%	3,457	23.39%	14,781
Saline	3,125	52.12%	2,471	41.21%	249	4.15%	124	2.07%	27	0.45%	654	10.91%	5,996
Sangamon	10,422	49.79%	9,351	44.67%	458	2.19%	626	2.99%	77	0.37%	1,071	5.12%	20,934
Schuyler	1,622	43.31%	1,876	50.09%	18	0.48%	216	5.77%	13	0.35%	-254	-6.78%	3,745
Scott	1,101	42.76%	1,376	53.44%	20	0.78%	71	2.76%	7	0.27%	-275	-10.68%	2,575
Shelby	3,312	42.30%	4,065	51.92%	40	0.51%	380	4.85%	33	0.42%	-753	-9.62%	7,830
St. Clair	12,619	48.66%	11,342	43.73%	1,517	5.85%	344	1.33%	112	0.43%	1,277	4.92%	25,934
Stark	1,635	66.27%	738	29.91%	22	0.89%	71	2.88%	1	0.04%	897	36.36%	2,467
Stephenson	4,605	50.93%	4,076	45.08%	84	0.93%	254	2.81%	22	0.24%	529	5.85%	9,041
Tazewell	3,767	47.55%	3,786	47.78%	119	1.50%	237	2.99%	14	0.18%	-19	-0.24%	7,923
Union	1,695	37.43%	2,690	59.40%	12	0.26%	127	2.80%	5	0.11%	-995	-21.97%	4,529
Vermilion	11,726	60.62%	6,320	32.67%	385	1.99%	824	4.26%	89	0.46%	5,406	27.95%	19,344
Wabash	1,511	43.06%	1,814	51.70%	22	0.63%	158	4.50%	4	0.11%	-303	-8.63%	3,509
Warren	3,283	54.12%	2,327	38.36%	175	2.88%	257	4.24%	24	0.40%	956	15.76%	6,066
Washington	2,355	53.87%	1,830	41.86%	64	1.46%	111	2.54%	12	0.27%	525	12.01%	4,372
Wayne	2,946	49.60%	2,791	46.99%	26	0.44%	160	2.69%	17	0.29%	155	2.61%	5,940
White	2,436	43.50%	2,934	52.39%	61	1.09%	147	2.63%	22	0.39%	-498	-8.89%	5,600
Whiteside	5,257	65.74%	2,140	26.76%	64	0.80%	498	6.23%	38	0.48%	3,117	38.98%	7,997
Will	10,358	61.29%	5,693	33.68%	425	2.51%	316	1.87%	109	0.64%	4,665	27.60%	16,901
Williamson	4,786	52.63%	3,513	38.63%	484	5.32%	272	2.99%	38	0.42%	1,273	14.00%	9,093
Winnebago	8,919	71.54%	2,163	17.35%	747	5.99%	531	4.26%	107	0.86%	6,756	54.19%	12,467
Woodford	2,204	47.53%	2,156	46.50%	54	1.16%	203	4.38%	20	0.43%	48	1.04%	4,637
Totals	629,932	54.53%	450,810	39.02%	34,711	3.00%	29,364	2.54%	10,437	0.90%	179,122	15.50%	1,155,254

== See also ==
- United States presidential elections in Illinois
