= 1908 United States presidential election in Michigan =

- November 3, 1908

All 14 Michigan votes to the Electoral College

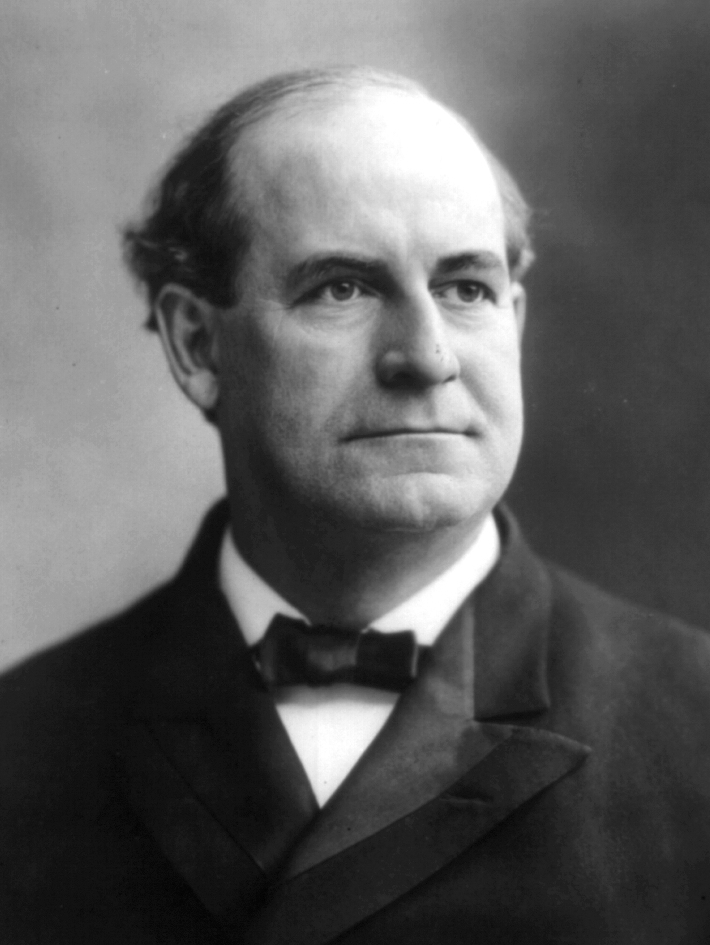
Nominee	William Howard Taft	William Jennings Bryan
Party	Republican	Democratic
Home state	Ohio	Nebraska
Running mate	James S. Sherman	John W. Kern
Electoral vote	14	0
Popular vote	335,580	175,771
Percentage	61.93%	32.44%
County results
Taft
50–60%
60–70%
70–80%
80–90%
90–100%
President before election
Theodore Roosevelt
Republican
Elected President
William Howard Taft
Republican

The 1908 United States presidential election in Michigan took place on November 3, 1908, as part of the 1908 United States presidential election. Voters chose 14 representatives, or electors, to the Electoral College, who voted for president and vice president.

Following the Panic of 1893 and the Populist movement, Michigan would turn from a competitive Republican-leaning state into a rigidly one-party polity dominated by the Republican Party. The dominance of the culture of the Lower Peninsula by anti-slavery Yankees would be augmented by the turn of formerly Democratic-leaning German Catholics away from that party as a result of the remodelled party's agrarian and free silver sympathies, which became rigidly opposed by both the upper class and workers who followed them. The state Democratic Party was further crippled via the Populist movement severing its critical financial ties with business and commerce in Michigan as in other Northern states. A brief turn of the strongly evangelical Cabinet Counties toward the Populist movement in the 1896 presidential election would reverse itself following the return to prosperity under President William McKinley, so that these joined in Republican hegemony until the Great Depression. McKinley would also later beat Bryan in the state again four years later.

In the 1894 elections, the Democratic Party lost all but one seat in the Michigan legislature, and the party would only make minor gains there for the next third of a century. Unlike the other states of the Upper Midwest, the Yankee influence on the culture of the Lower Peninsula was so strong that left-wing third parties did not provide significant opposition to the Republicans, nor was there more than a moderate degree of coordinated factionalism within the hegemonic Michigan Republican Party.

With Michigan's solid one-party GOP status not threatened, neither William Howard Taft nor Bryan campaigned in the state, and the only straw vote suggested that Republican nominee Taft from Ohio would carry the state over third-time Democratic candidate Nebraskan William Jennings Bryan by between fifty and one hundred thousand votes — still a halving of the huge margin Theodore Roosevelt had gained over Alton B. Parker four years previously. However, the Santa Ana Register estimate proved extremely conservative, for the Republican ticket received nearly 62 percent of the vote, while the Democrats received only 32 percent.

With 61.93 percent of the popular vote, Michigan would be Taft's third strongest victory in terms of popular vote percentage after Vermont and Maine. This was the second time, after the previous election, that any party carried every county in the state.

== Results ==
General Election Results
Party	Pledged to	Elector	Votes
Republican	William Howard Taft	Frederick M. Alger	335,580
Republican	William Howard Taft	John N. Bagley	333,446
Republican	William Howard Taft	George Barnes	333,174
Republican	William Howard Taft	Jerome H. Bishop	333,161
Republican	William Howard Taft	Clifford C. Ward	333,152
Republican	William Howard Taft	Frederick A. Washburn	333,152
Republican	William Howard Taft	James R. Thompson	333,148
Republican	William Howard Taft	Henry B. Smith	333,141
Republican	William Howard Taft	George Clapperton	333,112
Republican	William Howard Taft	William H. Acker	333,079
Republican	William Howard Taft	Alvin M. Bentley	333,064
Republican	William Howard Taft	Salomon Stern	333,050
Republican	William Howard Taft	Warren A. Cartier	333,029
Republican	William Howard Taft	Alfred J. Doherty	333,028
Democratic	William Jennings Bryan	John D. Mershon	175,771
Democratic	William Jennings Bryan	John F. Bible	174,715
Democratic	William Jennings Bryan	John F. Murphy	174,665
Democratic	William Jennings Bryan	Edwin A. Burch	174,616
Democratic	William Jennings Bryan	Charles R. Sligh	174,579
Democratic	William Jennings Bryan	Jacob Martin	174,543
Democratic	William Jennings Bryan	Daniel J. Gerow	174,517
Democratic	William Jennings Bryan	Emery D. Weimer	174,496
Democratic	William Jennings Bryan	Thomas J. Dundon	174,495
Democratic	William Jennings Bryan	Frederick Thoman	174,492
Democratic	William Jennings Bryan	Robert H. Rayburn	174,470
Democratic	William Jennings Bryan	Daniel L. Ensign	174,460
Democratic	William Jennings Bryan	Charles W. Williams	174,453
Democratic	William Jennings Bryan	John W. Ewing	174,392
Prohibition	Eugene W. Chafin	William A. Taylor	16,974
Prohibition	Eugene W. Chafin	Fred W. Corbett	16,812
Prohibition	Eugene W. Chafin	Newton J. Carey	16,792
Prohibition	Eugene W. Chafin	Leroy H. White	16,791
Prohibition	Eugene W. Chafin	Andrew J. Liverance	16,789
Prohibition	Eugene W. Chafin	Alexander McVittie	16,786
Prohibition	Eugene W. Chafin	Lucius D. Boynton	16,785
Prohibition	Eugene W. Chafin	Judge R. Barnum	16,782
Prohibition	Eugene W. Chafin	Joseph Leighton	16,777
Prohibition	Eugene W. Chafin	George Roelofs	16,775
Prohibition	Eugene W. Chafin	Byron P. Wilkinson	16,775
Prohibition	Eugene W. Chafin	George M. Sprout	16,773
Prohibition	Eugene W. Chafin	John T. Spencer	16,768
Prohibition	Eugene W. Chafin	Jefferson D. Leland	16,759
Socialist	Eugene V. Debs	Deland M. Stevens	11,586
Socialist	Eugene V. Debs	William H. Barry	11,538
Socialist	Eugene V. Debs	George M. Campbell	11,537
Socialist	Eugene V. Debs	August Wolf	11,537
Socialist	Eugene V. Debs	Charles Hunt	11,528
Socialist	Eugene V. Debs	Joseph La Barge	11,525
Socialist	Eugene V. Debs	Thomas Smith	11,524
Socialist	Eugene V. Debs	David C. Nettleton	11,516
Socialist	Eugene V. Debs	Reuben Frantz	11,514
Socialist	Eugene V. Debs	Jerry Van Weirden	11,512
Socialist	Eugene V. Debs	William H. Bingham	11,511
Socialist	Eugene V. Debs	William F. Lilsanantti	11,468
Socialist	Eugene V. Debs	John G. Heal	11,426
Socialist	Eugene V. Debs	Anna Grigsby Lockwood	7,847 (Note: There were also 3,421 votes for "Anna G. Lockwood" and 253 votes for "Anna Grigsby" that were recorded separately. The combined total for Lockwood would therefore have been 11,521.)
Socialist Labor	August Gillhaus	Henry Ulbright	1,096
Socialist Labor	August Gillhaus	Albert B. Latta	1,067
Independence	Thomas L. Hisgen	C. P. Sterns	760
Independence	Thomas L. Hisgen	William J. Hall	742
Independence	Thomas L. Hisgen	George Whitmore	740
Independence	Thomas L. Hisgen	John J. Beams	738
Independence	Thomas L. Hisgen	Edward Doyden	738
Independence	Thomas L. Hisgen	E. Hayward	736
Independence	Thomas L. Hisgen	Thad King	736
Independence	Thomas L. Hisgen	John E. Long	735
Independence	Thomas L. Hisgen	R. L. Horton	734
Independence	Thomas L. Hisgen	W. J. Cushway	733
Independence	Thomas L. Hisgen	F. F. French	733
Independence	Thomas L. Hisgen	George Gerould	732
Independence	Thomas L. Hisgen	Charles Lamb	727
Independence	Thomas L. Hisgen	P. Lowry	726
United Christian	Daniel Turney	J. F. Cook	63
United Christian	Daniel Turney	H. L. Feerman	63
United Christian	Daniel Turney	J. H. Reilley	63
United Christian	Daniel Turney	V. Wagner	63
United Christian	Daniel Turney	G. W. Weaver	63
United Christian	Daniel Turney	T. Burley	62
United Christian	Daniel Turney	O. R. Stikon	62
United Christian	Daniel Turney	A. Tanner	62
United Christian	Daniel Turney	Thomas Williams	62
United Christian	Daniel Turney	B. Clark	61
United Christian	Daniel Turney	J. R. Keyes	61
United Christian	Daniel Turney	F. E. Kinsmore	61
United Christian	Daniel Turney	Charles M. Meyers	61
United Christian	Daniel Turney	G. Wyman	61
Votes cast (Note: Based on highest elector on each ticket)			541,830

=== Results by county ===
The results below are those for the highest elector on each ticket. The results listed in the 1909-1910 Michigan Manual are a "general average" for each ticket and thus not the "true" results.

County	William Howard Taft Republican		William Jennings Bryan Democratic		Eugene W. Chafin Prohibition		Eugene V. Debs Socialist		August Gillhaus Socialist Labor		Thomas L. Hisgen Independence		Margin		Total votes cast
County	#	%	#	%	#	%	#	%	#	%	#	%	#	%	Total votes cast
Alcona	826	76.34%	176	16.27%	24	2.22%	54	4.99%	2	0.18%	0	0.00%	650	60.07%	1,082
Alger	1,006	75.53%	235	17.64%	22	1.65%	60	4.50%	2	0.15%	7	0.53%	771	57.88%	1,332
Allegan	5,479	67.26%	2,211	27.14%	294	3.61%	135	1.66%	11	0.14%	16	0.20%	3,268	40.12%	8,146
Alpena	2,377	68.17%	952	27.30%	34	0.98%	116	3.33%	6	0.17%	2	0.06%	1,425	40.87%	3,487
Antrim	2,032	73.20%	576	20.75%	101	3.64%	59	2.13%	3	0.11%	5	0.18%	1,456	52.45%	2,776
Arenac	1,085	56.16%	717	37.11%	60	3.11%	67	3.47%	2	0.10%	1	0.05%	368	19.05%	1,932
Baraga	770	70.00%	293	26.64%	19	1.73%	14	1.27%	1	0.09%	3	0.27%	477	43.36%	1,100
Barry	3,254	57.37%	2,139	37.71%	246	4.34%	21	0.37%	9	0.16%	3	0.05%	1,115	19.66%	5,672
Bay	6,760	58.22%	4,223	36.37%	180	1.55%	403	3.47%	27	0.23%	18	0.16%	2,537	21.85%	11,611
Benzie	1,442	62.72%	555	24.14%	210	9.13%	77	3.35%	9	0.39%	6	0.26%	887	38.58%	2,299
Berrien	7,269	58.05%	4,606	36.78%	275	2.20%	276	2.20%	18	0.14%	64	0.51%	2,663	21.27%	12,522 (Note: Includes 14 votes for Turney)
Branch	3,721	57.52%	2,400	37.10%	188	2.91%	131	2.03%	13	0.20%	16	0.25%	1,321	20.42%	6,469
Calhoun	6,859	55.96%	4,253	34.70%	473	3.86%	530	4.32%	93	0.76%	48	0.39%	2,606	21.26%	12,256
Cass	3,092	52.74%	2,474	42.20%	148	2.52%	128	2.18%	9	0.15%	10	0.17%	618	10.54%	5,863 (Note: Includes 2 votes for Turney)
Charlevoix	2,538	68.86%	806	21.87%	149	4.04%	176	4.77%	6	0.16%	11	0.30%	1,732	46.99%	3,686
Cheboygan	2,081	58.99%	1,217	34.50%	130	3.68%	84	2.38%	11	0.31%	5	0.14%	864	24.49%	3,528
Chippewa	2,422	64.09%	1,182	31.28%	130	3.44%	37	0.98%	2	0.05%	4	0.11%	1,240	32.81%	3,779
Clare	1,350	68.15%	567	28.62%	38	1.92%	22	1.11%	3	0.15%	1	0.05%	783	39.53%	1,981
Clinton	3,493	59.59%	2,193	37.41%	147	2.51%	23	0.39%	4	0.07%	1	0.02%	1,300	22.18%	5,862 (Note: Includes 1 vote for Turney)
Crawford	593	67.54%	243	27.68%	12	1.37%	28	3.19%	2	0.23%	0	0.00%	350	39.86%	878
Delta	3,257	71.68%	1,101	24.23%	84	1.85%	80	1.76%	15	0.33%	7	0.15%	2,156	47.45%	4,544
Dickinson	2,515	76.10%	549	16.61%	176	5.33%	44	1.33%	12	0.36%	7	0.21%	1,966	59.49%	3,305
Eaton	4,383	55.88%	3,148	40.13%	208	2.65%	89	1.13%	9	0.11%	7	0.09%	1,235	15.74%	7,844
Emmet	2,323	62.11%	1,016	27.17%	204	5.45%	184	4.92%	11	0.29%	2	0.05%	1,307	34.95%	3,740
Genesee	7,268	64.27%	3,267	28.89%	444	3.93%	303	2.68%	18	0.16%	9	0.08%	4,001	35.38%	11,309
Gladwin	1,195	71.47%	393	23.50%	48	2.87%	31	1.85%	4	0.24%	1	0.06%	802	47.97%	1,672
Gogebic	2,265	72.95%	617	19.87%	147	4.73%	60	1.93%	7	0.23%	5	0.16%	1,648	53.08%	3,105 (Note: Includes 4 votes for Turney)
Grand Traverse	2,821	65.76%	1,301	30.33%	134	3.12%	27	0.63%	2	0.05%	5	0.12%	1,520	35.43%	4,290
Gratiot	4,164	61.70%	2,374	35.18%	178	2.64%	32	0.47%	1	0.01%	0	0.00%	1,790	26.52%	6,749
Hillsdale	4,517	61.00%	2,549	34.42%	280	3.78%	43	0.58%	2	0.03%	14	0.19%	1,968	26.58%	7,405
Houghton	9,381	73.12%	2,421	18.87%	627	4.89%	371	2.89%	8	0.06%	16	0.12%	6,960	54.25%	12,829 (Note: Includes 5 votes for Turney)
Huron	3,590	67.72%	1,481	27.94%	164	3.09%	57	1.08%	5	0.09%	4	0.08%	2,109	39.78%	5,301
Ingham	6,725	53.65%	5,025	40.09%	585	4.67%	157	1.25%	22	0.18%	21	0.17%	1,700	13.56%	12,535
Ionia	4,598	54.71%	3,241	38.56%	461	5.49%	92	1.09%	3	0.04%	9	0.11%	1,357	16.15%	8,404
Iosco	1,227	63.02%	670	34.41%	40	2.05%	9	0.46%	0	0.00%	1	0.05%	557	28.61%	1,947
Iron	2,060	85.51%	265	11.00%	40	1.66%	22	0.91%	5	0.21%	15	0.62%	1,795	74.51%	2,409
Isabella	3,185	63.17%	1,666	33.04%	133	2.64%	53	1.05%	3	0.06%	2	0.04%	1,519	30.13%	5,042
Jackson	6,768	54.07%	5,234	41.82%	331	2.64%	161	1.29%	11	0.09%	9	0.07%	1,534	12.26%	12,516
Kalamazoo	6,571	54.64%	4,518	37.57%	455	3.78%	425	3.53%	17	0.14%	36	0.30%	2,053	17.07%	12,025 (Note: Includes 3 votes for Turney)
Kalkaska	1,156	69.26%	359	21.51%	105	6.29%	46	2.76%	2	0.12%	1	0.06%	797	47.75%	1,669
Kent	16,663	55.46%	11,494	38.26%	859	2.86%	947	3.15%	67	0.22%	15	0.05%	5,169	17.20%	30,045
Keweenaw	1,029	90.50%	64	5.63%	16	1.41%	25	2.20%	0	0.00%	2	0.18%	965	84.87%	1,137
Lake	678	68.97%	254	25.84%	14	1.42%	31	3.15%	4	0.41%	2	0.20%	424	43.13%	983
Lapeer	3,454	63.52%	1,657	30.47%	289	5.31%	34	0.63%	0	0.00%	4	0.07%	1,797	33.05%	5,438
Leelanau	1,268	66.11%	578	30.14%	46	2.40%	23	1.20%	2	0.10%	1	0.05%	690	35.97%	1,918
Lenawee	6,607	56.22%	4,704	40.03%	398	3.39%	28	0.24%	9	0.08%	4	0.03%	1,903	16.19%	11,752
Livingston	2,740	50.81%	2,418	44.84%	219	4.06%	10	0.19%	2	0.04%	4	0.07%	322	5.97%	5,393
Luce	357	70.83%	108	21.43%	31	6.15%	4	0.79%	2	0.40%	2	0.40%	249	49.40%	504
Mackinac	1,161	58.84%	773	39.18%	23	1.17%	10	0.51%	2	0.10%	3	0.15%	388	19.67%	1,973
Macomb	4,497	56.76%	3,158	39.86%	226	2.85%	34	0.43%	2	0.03%	1	0.01%	1,339	16.90%	7,923
Manistee	2,709	56.76%	1,805	37.82%	109	2.28%	139	2.91%	2	0.04%	9	0.19%	904	18.94%	4,773
Marquette	5,635	74.79%	1,278	16.96%	261	3.46%	331	4.39%	13	0.17%	14	0.19%	4,357	57.83%	7,534
Mason	2,590	65.70%	1,136	28.82%	151	3.83%	52	1.32%	4	0.10%	9	0.23%	1,454	36.88%	3,942
Mecosta	2,721	65.72%	1,183	28.57%	151	3.65%	80	1.93%	2	0.05%	3	0.07%	1,538	37.15%	4,140
Menominee	2,862	64.88%	1,313	29.77%	128	2.90%	79	1.79%	14	0.32%	15	0.34%	1,549	35.12%	4,411
Midland	2,004	66.82%	889	29.64%	53	1.77%	43	1.43%	7	0.23%	3	0.10%	1,115	37.18%	2,999
Missaukee	1,573	74.94%	446	21.25%	51	2.43%	19	0.91%	3	0.14%	6	0.29%	1,127	53.69%	2,099
Monroe	4,208	53.04%	3,457	43.58%	211	2.66%	50	0.63%	3	0.04%	3	0.04%	751	9.47%	7,933
Montcalm	4,585	69.05%	1,725	25.98%	198	2.98%	116	1.75%	6	0.09%	10	0.15%	2,860	43.07%	6,640
Montmorency	588	75.38%	180	23.08%	3	0.38%	8	1.03%	0	0.00%	1	0.13%	408	52.31%	780
Muskegon	5,103	69.29%	1,803	24.48%	149	2.02%	273	3.71%	15	0.20%	17	0.23%	3,300	44.81%	7,365
Newaygo	2,682	69.28%	962	24.85%	148	3.82%	69	1.78%	9	0.23%	1	0.03%	1,720	44.43%	3,871
Oakland	6,287	58.19%	3,962	36.67%	423	3.91%	107	0.99%	11	0.10%	15	0.14%	2,325	21.52%	10,805
Oceana	2,462	68.39%	803	22.31%	259	7.19%	58	1.61%	12	0.33%	6	0.17%	1,659	46.08%	3,600
Ogemaw	1,225	68.32%	458	25.54%	81	4.52%	25	1.39%	3	0.17%	1	0.06%	767	42.78%	1,793
Ontonagon	1,250	71.23%	429	24.44%	18	1.03%	47	2.68%	5	0.28%	6	0.34%	821	46.78%	1,755
Osceola	2,826	75.00%	769	20.41%	146	3.87%	5	0.13%	16	0.42%	6	0.16%	2,057	54.59%	3,768
Oscoda	332	72.65%	114	24.95%	8	1.75%	3	0.66%	0	0.00%	0	0.00%	218	47.70%	457
Otsego	866	72.53%	276	23.12%	34	2.85%	15	1.26%	1	0.08%	2	0.17%	590	49.41%	1,194
Ottawa	5,659	66.17%	2,441	28.54%	262	3.06%	165	1.93%	9	0.11%	15	0.18%	3,218	37.63%	8,552
Presque Isle	1,722	81.42%	305	14.42%	18	0.85%	57	2.70%	11	0.52%	2	0.09%	1,417	67.00%	2,115
Roscommon	430	69.24%	149	23.99%	18	2.90%	18	2.90%	3	0.48%	3	0.48%	281	45.25%	621
Saginaw	9,464	54.43%	7,025	40.40%	244	1.40%	558	3.21%	73	0.42%	23	0.13%	2,439	14.03%	17,387
Sanilac	4,184	68.88%	1,484	24.43%	358	5.89%	43	0.71%	2	0.03%	3	0.05%	2,700	44.45%	6,074
Schoolcraft	1,364	79.16%	295	17.12%	42	2.44%	16	0.93%	3	0.17%	3	0.17%	1,069	62.04%	1,723
Shiawassee	4,211	57.92%	2,350	32.32%	526	7.24%	171	2.35%	7	0.10%	4	0.06%	1,861	25.60%	7,270
St. Clair	7,334	62.37%	3,754	31.92%	332	2.82%	295	2.51%	31	0.26%	9	0.08%	3,580	30.44%	11,759
St. Joseph	3,464	52.89%	2,773	42.34%	173	2.64%	108	1.65%	3	0.05%	29	0.44%	691	10.55%	6,550
Tuscola	4,448	68.77%	1,575	24.35%	391	6.05%	46	0.71%	6	0.09%	2	0.03%	2,873	44.42%	6,468
Van Buren	4,565	62.78%	2,335	32.11%	195	2.68%	129	1.77%	12	0.17%	36	0.50%	2,230	30.67%	7,272
Washtenaw	5,845	54.58%	4,441	41.47%	305	2.85%	88	0.82%	16	0.15%	14	0.13%	1,404	13.11%	10,709
Wayne	50,618	63.68%	24,603	30.95%	1,446	1.82%	2,461	3.10%	306	0.38%	54	0.07%	26,015	32.73%	79,488
Wexford	2,892	72.01%	832	20.72%	237	5.90%	39	0.97%	8	0.20%	6	0.15%	2,060	51.29%	4,016
Totals	335,580	61.93%	175,771	32.44%	16,974	3.13%	11,586	2.14%	1,096	0.20%	760	0.14%	159,809	29.49%	541,830

== See also ==
- United States presidential elections in Michigan
