= 1896 United States presidential election in Illinois =

- November 3, 1896
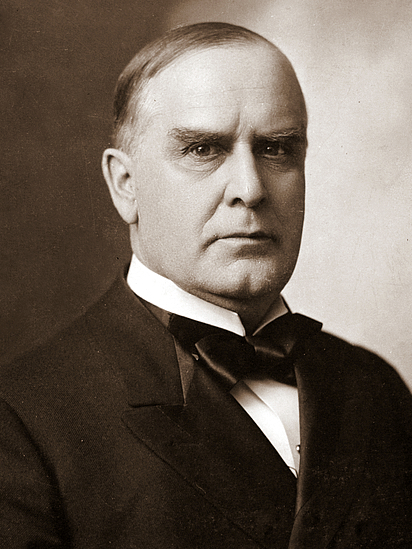

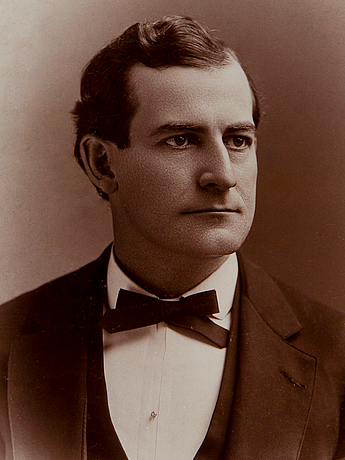
Nominee	William McKinley	William Jennings Bryan
Party	Republican	Democratic
Alliance		Populist
Home state	Ohio	Nebraska
Running mate	Garret Hobart	Arthur Sewall
Electoral vote	24	0
Popular vote	607,130	465,613
Percentage	55.66%	42.68%
County results
McKinley
40–50%
50–60%
60–70%
70–80%
80–90%
Bryan
40–50%
50–60%
60–70%
President before election
Grover Cleveland
Democratic
Elected President
William McKinley
Republican

The 1896 United States presidential election in Illinois took place on November 3, 1896. All contemporary 45 states were part of the 1896 United States presidential election. State voters chose 24 electors to the Electoral College, which selected the president and vice president.

Illinois was won by the Republican candidate former Governor of Ohio William McKinley and his running mate Garret Hobart of New Jersey. They defeated the Democratic candidate and former United States Representative from Nebraska William Jennings Bryan and his running mate Arthur Sewall of Maine. McKinley won the state by a margin of 12.98%.

Bryan would lose Illinois to McKinley again four years later and would later lose the state again in 1908 to William Howard Taft.

== Results ==
1896 United States presidential election in Illinois
Party	Candidate	Votes	Percentage	Electoral votes
Republican	William McKinley	607,130	55.66%	24
Democratic	William Jennings Bryan	464,523	41.91%	0
Populist	William Jennings Bryan	1,090	0.77%	0
Total	William Jennings Bryan	465,613	42.68%	0
Prohibition	Joshua Levering	9,796	0.90%	0
National Democratic	John M. Palmer	6,390	0.59%	0
Socialist Labor	Charles H. Matchett	1,147	0.11%	0
National Prohibition	Charles Eugene Bentley	793	0.07%	0
Totals		1,090,869	100.00%	24
Voter turnout				—

=== Chicago results ===
1896 United States presidential election in Chicago
Party	Candidate	Votes	Percentage
Republican	William McKinley	198,749	57.54%
Democratic	William Jennings Bryan	142,206	41.17%
National Democratic	John M. Palmer	2,089	0.60%
Prohibition	Joshua Levering	1,558	0.45%
Socialist Labor	Charles H. Matchett	647	0.19%
National Prohibition	Charles Eugene Bentley	136	0.04%
Totals		345,483	100.00%

== See also ==
- United States presidential elections in Illinois
