= 1896 United States presidential election in Iowa =

- November 3, 1896

Nominee	William McKinley	William Jennings Bryan
Party	Republican	Populist (Note: Although Bryan ran under the Democratic Party nationally, he ran in Iowa under the endorsement of the Populist Party.)
Alliance		Democratic
Home state	Ohio	Nebraska
Running mate	Garret Hobart	Thomas E. Watson
Electoral vote	13	0
Popular vote	289,293	223,741
Percentage	55.47%	42.90%
County results
McKinley
40–50%
50–60%
60–70%
70–80%
Bryan
40–50%
50–60%
60–70%
President before election
Grover Cleveland
Democratic
Elected President
William McKinley
Republican

The 1896 United States presidential election in Iowa took place on November 3, 1896. All contemporary 45 states were part of the 1896 United States presidential election. Voters chose 13 electors to the Electoral College, which selected the president and vice president.

Iowa voted for the Republican nominees, former Ohio Governor William McKinley and his running mate Garret Hobart of New Jersey, over the Populist nominees, former Representative William Jennings Bryan, and former Representative Thomas E. Watson.

McKinley won 55.47% of the vote to Bryan's 42.90%, a margin of 12.57%. Bryan's performance in Iowa was the worst performance for a Democratic candidate since 1880. McKinley both became the first Republican to win over 55% of the popular vote, and the first to win multiple counties that hadn't voted for the Republican candidate since 1880. This was also the first election since 1864 in which Iowa voted more Republican than neighboring Minnesota.

By 1896, incumbent president Grover Cleveland was eligible to run for a second consecutive term (third overall), however he had declined. People had begun losing money during the panic of 1893, and blamed Cleveland for it, which was a big blow for the Democrats. This left the Democratic nomination open to multiple candidates. Eventually, William Jennings Bryan won both the Democratic nomination and the endorsement of the Populist nomination. In Iowa, Bryan had uniquely run under the Populist party, with Thomas E. Watson as his running mate.

Bryan would lose Iowa to McKinley again four years later and would later lose the state again in 1908 to William Howard Taft.

== Results ==
1896 United States presidential election in Iowa
Party	Candidate	Votes	Percentage	Electoral votes
Republican	William McKinley	289,293	55.47%	13
Populist	William Jennings Bryan	223,741	42.90%	0
National Democratic	John M. Palmer	4,516	0.87%	0
Prohibition	Joshua Levering	3,192	0.61%	0
Socialist Labor	Charles H. Matchett	453	0.09%	0
National Prohibition	Charles Eugene Bentley	352	0.07%	0
Totals		521,547	100.00%	13
Voter turnout				—

=== Results by county ===
County	William McKinley Republican		William Jennings Bryan Populist		John McAuley Palmer National Democratic		Joshua Levering Prohibition		Various candidates Other parties		Margin		Total votes cast
County	#	%	#	%	#	%	#	%	#	%	#	%	Total votes cast
Adair	2,127	51.74%	1,946	47.34%	28	0.68%	9	0.22%	1	0.02%	181	4.40%	4,111
Adams	1,736	49.77%	1,701	48.77%	22	0.63%	25	0.72%	4	0.11%	35	1.00%	3,488
Allamakee	2,471	55.16%	1,897	42.34%	95	2.12%	13	0.29%	4	0.09%	574	12.81%	4,480
Appanoose	3,046	50.54%	2,940	48.78%	19	0.32%	12	0.20%	10	0.17%	106	1.76%	6,027
Audubon	1,705	54.14%	1,417	45.00%	16	0.51%	11	0.35%	0	0.00%	288	9.15%	3,149
Benton	3,604	57.50%	2,560	40.84%	63	1.01%	38	0.61%	3	0.05%	1,044	16.66%	6,268
Black Hawk	4,643	66.05%	2,167	30.83%	158	2.25%	56	0.80%	6	0.09%	2,476	35.22%	7,030
Boone	3,741	56.43%	2,801	42.25%	26	0.39%	56	0.84%	6	0.09%	940	14.18%	6,630
Bremer	2,116	54.02%	1,704	43.50%	73	1.86%	20	0.51%	4	0.10%	412	10.52%	3,917
Buchanan	2,865	55.30%	2,233	43.10%	50	0.97%	31	0.60%	2	0.04%	632	12.20%	5,181
Buena Vista	2,368	65.83%	1,178	32.75%	22	0.61%	26	0.72%	3	0.08%	1,190	33.08%	3,597
Butler	2,670	64.95%	1,372	33.37%	31	0.75%	36	0.88%	2	0.05%	1,298	31.57%	4,111
Calhoun	2,698	67.25%	1,280	31.90%	24	0.60%	10	0.25%	0	0.00%	1,418	35.34%	4,012
Carroll	2,066	45.67%	2,417	53.43%	25	0.55%	13	0.29%	3	0.07%	-351	-7.76%	4,524
Cass	2,959	56.11%	2,240	42.47%	58	1.10%	13	0.25%	4	0.08%	719	13.63%	5,274
Cedar	2,717	54.50%	2,128	42.69%	78	1.56%	50	1.00%	12	0.24%	589	11.82%	4,985
Cerro Gordo	3,048	66.73%	1,408	30.82%	38	0.83%	59	1.29%	15	0.33%	1,640	35.90%	4,568
Cherokee	2,343	60.08%	1,464	37.54%	25	0.64%	64	1.64%	4	0.10%	879	22.54%	3,900
Chickasaw	1,967	48.20%	2,084	51.07%	17	0.42%	10	0.25%	3	0.07%	-117	-2.87%	4,081
Clarke	1,646	51.53%	1,517	47.50%	11	0.34%	19	0.59%	1	0.03%	129	4.04%	3,194
Clay	1,880	65.99%	933	32.75%	14	0.49%	19	0.67%	3	0.11%	947	33.24%	2,849
Clayton	3,302	52.16%	2,910	45.96%	81	1.28%	32	0.51%	6	0.09%	392	6.19%	6,331
Clinton	5,584	54.02%	4,590	44.40%	83	0.80%	10	0.10%	70	0.68%	994	9.62%	10,337
Crawford	2,189	46.98%	2,396	51.43%	28	0.60%	38	0.82%	8	0.17%	-207	-4.44%	4,659
Dallas	3,326	57.87%	2,316	40.30%	36	0.63%	55	0.96%	14	0.24%	1,010	17.57%	5,747
Davis	1,652	40.87%	2,367	58.56%	8	0.20%	15	0.37%	0	0.00%	-715	-17.69%	4,042
Decatur	2,268	48.46%	2,362	50.47%	35	0.75%	9	0.19%	6	0.13%	-94	-2.01%	4,680
Delaware	2,799	60.52%	1,778	38.44%	23	0.50%	24	0.52%	1	0.02%	1,021	22.08%	4,625
Des Moines	4,549	53.06%	3,741	43.63%	241	2.81%	31	0.36%	12	0.14%	808	9.42%	8,574
Dickinson	1,131	67.36%	517	30.79%	17	1.01%	14	0.83%	0	0.00%	614	36.57%	1,679
Dubuque	5,203	43.51%	6,570	54.94%	153	1.28%	18	0.15%	14	0.12%	-1,367	-11.43%	11,958
Emmet	1,429	70.05%	559	27.40%	3	0.15%	47	2.30%	2	0.10%	870	42.65%	2,040
Fayette	3,522	54.69%	2,822	43.82%	38	0.59%	54	0.84%	4	0.06%	700	10.87%	6,440
Floyd	2,749	64.15%	1,461	34.10%	35	0.82%	30	0.70%	10	0.23%	1,288	30.06%	4,285
Franklin	2,439	72.57%	894	26.60%	17	0.51%	9	0.27%	2	0.06%	1,545	45.97%	3,361
Fremont	1,948	40.21%	2,857	58.97%	19	0.39%	11	0.23%	10	0.21%	-909	-18.76%	4,845
Greene	2,606	60.80%	1,629	38.01%	26	0.61%	18	0.42%	7	0.16%	977	22.80%	4,286
Grundy	1,894	60.36%	1,206	38.43%	21	0.67%	13	0.41%	4	0.13%	688	21.92%	3,138
Guthrie	2,541	52.66%	2,220	46.01%	19	0.39%	41	0.85%	4	0.08%	321	6.65%	4,825
Hamilton	3,074	69.25%	1,300	29.29%	46	1.04%	15	0.34%	4	0.09%	1,774	39.96%	4,439
Hancock	1,975	65.64%	1,007	33.47%	12	0.40%	11	0.37%	4	0.13%	968	32.17%	3,009
Hardin	3,575	68.46%	1,568	30.03%	38	0.73%	37	0.71%	4	0.08%	2,007	38.43%	5,222
Harrison	2,839	46.48%	3,214	52.62%	24	0.39%	27	0.44%	4	0.07%	-375	-6.14%	6,108
Henry	2,774	55.83%	2,092	42.10%	45	0.91%	52	1.05%	6	0.12%	682	13.73%	4,969
Howard	1,929	55.24%	1,507	43.16%	21	0.60%	29	0.83%	6	0.17%	422	12.08%	3,492
Humboldt	2,010	71.18%	783	27.73%	10	0.35%	17	0.60%	4	0.14%	1,227	43.45%	2,824
Ida	1,475	50.36%	1,421	48.51%	15	0.51%	15	0.51%	3	0.10%	54	1.84%	2,929
Iowa	2,391	53.78%	1,956	43.99%	79	1.78%	15	0.34%	5	0.11%	435	9.78%	4,446
Jackson	2,768	47.21%	3,019	51.49%	60	1.02%	16	0.27%	0	0.00%	-251	-4.28%	5,863
Jasper	3,713	52.49%	3,279	46.35%	40	0.57%	39	0.55%	3	0.04%	434	6.14%	7,074
Jefferson	2,478	57.24%	1,772	40.93%	36	0.83%	35	0.81%	8	0.18%	706	16.31%	4,329
Johnson	2,910	47.06%	3,170	51.26%	90	1.46%	8	0.13%	6	0.10%	-260	-4.20%	6,184
Jones	3,057	57.84%	2,143	40.55%	54	1.02%	20	0.38%	11	0.21%	914	17.29%	5,285
Keokuk	3,166	50.72%	2,891	46.32%	118	1.89%	61	0.98%	6	0.10%	275	4.41%	6,242
Kossuth	2,930	60.30%	1,861	38.30%	50	1.03%	16	0.33%	2	0.04%	1,069	22.00%	4,859
Lee	4,847	47.70%	5,153	50.71%	120	1.18%	35	0.34%	7	0.07%	-306	-3.01%	10,162
Linn	7,335	57.14%	5,283	41.16%	95	0.74%	99	0.77%	24	0.19%	2,052	15.99%	12,836
Louisa	2,035	59.12%	1,334	38.76%	37	1.07%	33	0.96%	3	0.09%	701	20.37%	3,442
Lucas	1,859	52.43%	1,621	45.71%	28	0.79%	33	0.93%	5	0.14%	238	6.71%	3,546
Lyon	1,568	51.33%	1,464	47.92%	5	0.16%	16	0.52%	2	0.07%	104	3.40%	3,055
Madison	2,313	50.28%	2,224	48.35%	28	0.61%	28	0.61%	7	0.15%	89	1.93%	4,600
Mahaska	4,256	50.69%	3,974	47.33%	56	0.67%	90	1.07%	20	0.24%	282	3.36%	8,396
Marion	2,741	46.05%	3,119	52.40%	33	0.55%	54	0.91%	5	0.08%	-378	-6.35%	5,952
Marshall	4,541	61.85%	2,626	35.77%	66	0.90%	102	1.39%	7	0.10%	1,915	26.08%	7,342
Mills	2,153	51.93%	1,958	47.23%	18	0.43%	15	0.36%	2	0.05%	195	4.70%	4,146
Mitchell	2,498	69.80%	1,031	28.81%	31	0.87%	17	0.47%	2	0.06%	1,467	40.99%	3,579
Monona	1,526	36.86%	2,558	61.79%	13	0.31%	40	0.97%	3	0.07%	-1,032	-24.93%	4,140
Monroe	1,836	45.69%	2,086	51.92%	35	0.87%	53	1.32%	8	0.20%	-250	-6.22%	4,018
Montgomery	2,927	63.67%	1,634	35.54%	12	0.26%	19	0.41%	5	0.11%	1,293	28.13%	4,597
Muscatine	3,627	55.02%	2,863	43.43%	72	1.09%	21	0.32%	9	0.14%	764	11.59%	6,592
O'Brien	2,421	60.10%	1,562	38.78%	19	0.47%	25	0.62%	1	0.02%	859	21.33%	4,028
Osceola	1,094	57.91%	767	40.60%	12	0.64%	15	0.79%	1	0.05%	327	17.31%	1,889
Page	3,213	56.32%	2,390	41.89%	22	0.39%	53	0.93%	27	0.47%	823	14.43%	5,705
Palo Alto	1,595	50.00%	1,547	48.50%	12	0.38%	35	1.10%	1	0.03%	48	1.50%	3,190
Plymouth	2,623	51.40%	2,392	46.87%	47	0.92%	38	0.74%	3	0.06%	231	4.53%	5,103
Pocahontas	1,866	56.82%	1,377	41.93%	16	0.49%	24	0.73%	1	0.03%	489	14.89%	3,284
Polk	11,127	60.24%	7,087	38.37%	111	0.60%	121	0.66%	25	0.14%	4,040	21.87%	18,471
Pottawattamie	5,810	51.00%	5,468	48.00%	86	0.75%	14	0.12%	14	0.12%	342	3.00%	11,392
Poweshiek	2,969	58.49%	2,013	39.66%	42	0.83%	49	0.97%	3	0.06%	956	18.83%	5,076
Ringgold	2,209	56.47%	1,651	42.20%	18	0.46%	25	0.64%	9	0.23%	558	14.26%	3,912
Sac	2,513	64.14%	1,346	34.35%	17	0.43%	36	0.92%	6	0.15%	1,167	29.79%	3,918
Scott	6,449	58.84%	4,032	36.79%	278	2.54%	29	0.26%	172	1.57%	2,417	22.05%	10,960
Shelby	2,019	47.85%	2,175	51.55%	11	0.26%	7	0.17%	7	0.17%	-156	-3.70%	4,219
Sioux	2,841	59.00%	1,898	39.42%	50	1.04%	24	0.50%	2	0.04%	943	19.58%	4,815
Story	3,630	68.72%	1,589	30.08%	22	0.42%	41	0.78%	0	0.00%	2,041	38.64%	5,282
Tama	3,054	53.28%	2,596	45.29%	37	0.65%	41	0.72%	4	0.07%	458	7.99%	5,732
Taylor	2,468	51.56%	2,293	47.90%	7	0.15%	16	0.33%	3	0.06%	175	3.66%	4,787
Union	2,196	46.85%	2,425	51.74%	32	0.68%	31	0.66%	3	0.06%	-229	-4.89%	4,687
Van Buren	2,478	53.54%	2,076	44.86%	45	0.97%	28	0.61%	1	0.02%	402	8.69%	4,628
Wapello	4,319	50.76%	4,041	47.49%	112	1.32%	24	0.28%	13	0.15%	278	3.27%	8,509
Warren	2,826	55.28%	2,214	43.31%	20	0.39%	50	0.98%	2	0.04%	612	11.97%	5,112
Washington	2,882	54.42%	2,292	43.28%	51	0.96%	54	1.02%	17	0.32%	590	11.14%	5,296
Wayne	2,101	48.93%	2,115	49.25%	29	0.68%	45	1.05%	4	0.09%	-14	-0.33%	4,294
Webster	3,691	58.09%	2,557	40.24%	45	0.71%	60	0.94%	1	0.02%	1,134	17.85%	6,354
Winnebago	1,912	72.12%	714	26.93%	10	0.38%	15	0.57%	0	0.00%	1,198	45.19%	2,651
Winneshiek	3,422	61.75%	2,033	36.68%	50	0.90%	25	0.45%	12	0.22%	1,389	25.06%	5,542
Woodbury	6,204	54.86%	4,876	43.12%	117	1.03%	97	0.86%	15	0.13%	1,328	11.74%	11,309
Worth	1,696	73.74%	584	25.39%	15	0.65%	5	0.22%	0	0.00%	1,112	48.35%	2,300
Wright	2,992	71.39%	1,138	27.15%	20	0.48%	38	0.91%	3	0.07%	1,854	44.24%	4,191
Totals	289,293	55.47%	223,741	42.90%	4,516	0.87%	3,192	0.61%	799	0.15%	65,552	12.57%	521,541

== See also ==
- United States presidential elections in Iowa
