= 1908 United States presidential election in Iowa =

- November 3, 1908

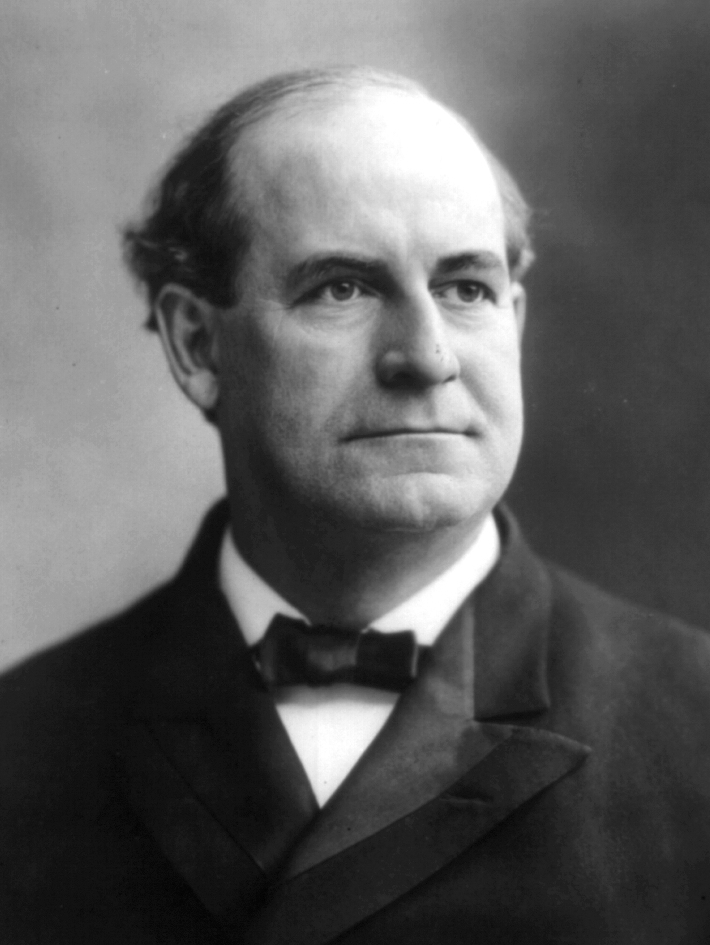
| Nominee | William Howard Taft | William Jennings Bryan |
| Party | Republican | Democratic |
| Home state | Ohio | Nebraska |
| Running mate | James S. Sherman | John W. Kern |
| Electoral vote | 13 | 0 |
| Popular vote | 275,209 | 200,771 |
| Percentage | 55.62% | 40.58% |
County results
Taft
40–50%
50–60%
60–70%
70–80%
Bryan
40–50%
50–60%
President before election
Theodore Roosevelt
Republican
Elected President
William Howard Taft
Republican

The 1908 United States presidential election in Iowa took place on November 3, 1908, as part of the 1908 United States presidential election. Voters chose 13 representatives, or electors to the Electoral College, who voted for president and vice president.

Iowa voted for the Republican nominees, Secretary of War William Howard Taft of Ohio and his running mate James S. Sherman of New York. They defeated the Democratic nominees, former U.S. Representative of Nebraska William Jennings Bryan and his running mate John W. Kern of Indiana. Taft won the state by a margin of 15.04%.

Bryan had previously lost Iowa to William McKinley in both 1896 and 1900.

== Results ==
1908 United States presidential election in Iowa
| Party | Candidate | Running mate | Popular vote | | Electoral vote | |
| Party | Candidate | Running mate | Count | % | Count | % |
|---|---|---|---|---|---|---|
| Republican | William Howard Taft of Ohio | James Schoolcraft Sherman of New York | 275,209 | 55.62% | 13 | 100.00% |
| Democratic | William Jennings Bryan of Nebraska | John Worth Kern of Indiana | 200,771 | 40.582% | 0 | 0.00% |
| Prohibition | Eugene Wilder Chafin of Illinois | Aaron Sherman Watkins of Ohio | 9,837 | 1.99% | 0 | 0.00% |
| Socialist | Eugene Victor Debs of Indiana | Benjamin Hanford of New York | 8,287 | 1.67% | 0 | 0.00% |
| Independence | Thomas Louis Hisgen of Massachusetts | John Temple Graves of Georgia | 404 | 0.08% | 0 | 0.00% |
| Populist | Thomas Edward Watson of Georgia | Samuel Wardell Williams of Indiana | 261 | 0.05% | 0 | 0.00% |
| Total | | | 494,769 | 100.00% | 13 | 100.00% |

=== Results by county ===
| County | William Howard Taft Republican | | William Jennings Bryan Democratic | | Eugene Wilder Chafin Prohibition | | Eugene Victor Debs Socialist | | Various candidates Other parties | | Margin | | Total votes cast |
| County | # | % | # | % | # | % | # | % | # | % | # | % | Total votes cast |
|---|---|---|---|---|---|---|---|---|---|---|---|---|---|
| Adair | 2,185 | 61.05% | 1,322 | 36.94% | 45 | 1.26% | 24 | 0.67% | 3 | 0.08% | 863 | 24.11% | 3,579 |
| Adams | 1,595 | 53.03% | 1,325 | 44.05% | 57 | 1.89% | 30 | 1.00% | 1 | 0.03% | 270 | 8.98% | 3,008 |
| Allamakee | 2,521 | 58.67% | 1,725 | 40.14% | 40 | 0.93% | 7 | 0.16% | 4 | 0.09% | 796 | 18.52% | 4,297 |
| Appanoose | 3,161 | 55.00% | 2,167 | 37.71% | 80 | 1.39% | 322 | 5.60% | 17 | 0.30% | 994 | 17.30% | 5,747 |
| Audubon | 1,701 | 60.86% | 1,050 | 37.57% | 33 | 1.18% | 9 | 0.32% | 2 | 0.07% | 651 | 23.29% | 2,795 |
| Benton | 3,180 | 55.08% | 2,418 | 41.88% | 76 | 1.32% | 94 | 1.63% | 5 | 0.09% | 762 | 13.20% | 5,773 |
| Black Hawk | 5,437 | 59.67% | 3,127 | 34.32% | 293 | 3.22% | 244 | 2.68% | 11 | 0.12% | 2,310 | 25.35% | 9,112 |
| Boone | 3,368 | 57.71% | 1,958 | 33.55% | 151 | 2.59% | 350 | 6.00% | 9 | 0.15% | 1,410 | 24.16% | 5,836 |
| Bremer | 1,656 | 45.30% | 1,925 | 52.65% | 56 | 1.53% | 14 | 0.38% | 5 | 0.14% | -269 | -7.36% | 3,656 |
| Buchanan | 2,552 | 55.76% | 1,889 | 41.27% | 118 | 2.58% | 16 | 0.35% | 2 | 0.04% | 663 | 14.49% | 4,577 |
| Buena Vista | 2,337 | 65.94% | 1,054 | 29.74% | 86 | 2.43% | 66 | 1.86% | 1 | 0.03% | 1,283 | 36.20% | 3,544 |
| Butler | 2,467 | 69.32% | 994 | 27.93% | 79 | 2.22% | 15 | 0.42% | 4 | 0.11% | 1,473 | 41.39% | 3,559 |
| Calhoun | 2,353 | 63.03% | 1,152 | 30.86% | 152 | 4.07% | 64 | 1.71% | 12 | 0.32% | 1,201 | 32.17% | 3,733 |
| Carroll | 1,865 | 41.93% | 2,510 | 56.43% | 58 | 1.30% | 12 | 0.27% | 3 | 0.07% | -645 | -14.50% | 4,448 |
| Cass | 2,799 | 61.19% | 1,655 | 36.18% | 47 | 1.03% | 64 | 1.40% | 9 | 0.20% | 1,144 | 25.01% | 4,574 |
| Cedar | 2,455 | 54.17% | 1,986 | 43.82% | 67 | 1.48% | 22 | 0.49% | 2 | 0.04% | 469 | 10.35% | 4,532 |
| Cerro Gordo | 2,990 | 64.05% | 1,520 | 32.56% | 98 | 2.10% | 60 | 1.29% | 0 | 0.00% | 1,470 | 31.49% | 4,668 |
| Cherokee | 2,300 | 66.07% | 1,084 | 31.14% | 68 | 1.95% | 24 | 0.69% | 5 | 0.14% | 1,216 | 34.93% | 3,481 |
| Chickasaw | 1,571 | 44.87% | 1,877 | 53.61% | 35 | 1.00% | 15 | 0.43% | 3 | 0.09% | -306 | -8.74% | 3,501 |
| Clarke | 1,624 | 58.00% | 1,134 | 40.50% | 37 | 1.32% | 3 | 0.11% | 2 | 0.07% | 490 | 17.50% | 2,800 |
| Clay | 1,921 | 69.68% | 778 | 28.22% | 41 | 1.49% | 16 | 0.58% | 1 | 0.04% | 1,143 | 41.46% | 2,757 |
| Clayton | 2,773 | 47.04% | 3,026 | 51.33% | 61 | 1.03% | 30 | 0.51% | 5 | 0.08% | -253 | -4.29% | 5,895 |
| Clinton | 4,836 | 48.68% | 4,821 | 48.53% | 80 | 0.81% | 191 | 1.92% | 6 | 0.06% | 15 | 0.15% | 9,934 |
| Crawford | 2,169 | 47.28% | 2,322 | 50.61% | 69 | 1.50% | 22 | 0.48% | 6 | 0.13% | -153 | -3.33% | 4,588 |
| Dallas | 3,132 | 59.94% | 1,871 | 35.81% | 142 | 2.72% | 78 | 1.49% | 2 | 0.04% | 1,261 | 24.13% | 5,225 |
| Davis | 1,484 | 44.98% | 1,749 | 53.02% | 40 | 1.21% | 20 | 0.61% | 6 | 0.18% | -265 | -8.03% | 3,299 |
| Decatur | 2,149 | 52.53% | 1,809 | 44.22% | 56 | 1.37% | 58 | 1.42% | 19 | 0.46% | 340 | 8.31% | 4,091 |
| Delaware | 2,396 | 60.35% | 1,471 | 37.05% | 65 | 1.64% | 36 | 0.91% | 2 | 0.05% | 925 | 23.30% | 3,970 |
| Des Moines | 4,153 | 48.92% | 3,975 | 46.83% | 103 | 1.21% | 233 | 2.74% | 25 | 0.29% | 178 | 2.10% | 8,489 |
| Dickinson | 1,109 | 66.57% | 503 | 30.19% | 26 | 1.56% | 25 | 1.50% | 3 | 0.18% | 606 | 36.37% | 1,666 |
| Dubuque | 4,708 | 39.71% | 6,645 | 56.05% | 53 | 0.45% | 427 | 3.60% | 22 | 0.19% | -1,937 | -16.34% | 11,855 |
| Emmet | 1,401 | 70.58% | 522 | 26.30% | 24 | 1.21% | 38 | 1.91% | 0 | 0.00% | 879 | 44.28% | 1,985 |
| Fayette | 3,369 | 56.83% | 2,281 | 38.48% | 179 | 3.02% | 86 | 1.45% | 13 | 0.22% | 1,088 | 18.35% | 5,928 |
| Floyd | 2,462 | 65.13% | 1,250 | 33.07% | 48 | 1.27% | 15 | 0.40% | 5 | 0.13% | 1,212 | 32.06% | 3,780 |
| Franklin | 2,154 | 73.02% | 737 | 24.98% | 50 | 1.69% | 5 | 0.17% | 4 | 0.14% | 1,417 | 48.03% | 2,950 |
| Fremont | 1,949 | 48.63% | 1,979 | 49.38% | 59 | 1.47% | 21 | 0.52% | 0 | 0.00% | -30 | -0.75% | 4,008 |
| Greene | 2,574 | 67.28% | 1,152 | 30.11% | 84 | 2.20% | 16 | 0.42% | 0 | 0.00% | 1,422 | 37.17% | 3,826 |
| Grundy | 1,861 | 61.77% | 1,105 | 36.67% | 45 | 1.49% | 1 | 0.03% | 1 | 0.03% | 756 | 25.09% | 3,013 |
| Guthrie | 2,560 | 61.44% | 1,532 | 36.77% | 60 | 1.44% | 11 | 0.26% | 4 | 0.10% | 1,028 | 24.67% | 4,167 |
| Hamilton | 2,765 | 68.17% | 1,145 | 28.23% | 109 | 2.69% | 34 | 0.84% | 3 | 0.07% | 1,620 | 39.94% | 4,056 |
| Hancock | 1,750 | 67.15% | 804 | 30.85% | 49 | 1.88% | 3 | 0.12% | 0 | 0.00% | 946 | 36.30% | 2,606 |
| Hardin | 3,123 | 69.76% | 1,187 | 26.51% | 146 | 3.26% | 19 | 0.42% | 2 | 0.04% | 1,936 | 43.24% | 4,477 |
| Harrison | 2,914 | 52.40% | 2,425 | 43.61% | 111 | 2.00% | 108 | 1.94% | 3 | 0.05% | 489 | 8.79% | 5,561 |
| Henry | 2,653 | 60.90% | 1,606 | 36.87% | 82 | 1.88% | 11 | 0.25% | 4 | 0.09% | 1,047 | 24.04% | 4,356 |
| Howard | 1,530 | 50.10% | 1,408 | 46.10% | 57 | 1.87% | 55 | 1.80% | 4 | 0.13% | 122 | 3.99% | 3,054 |
| Humboldt | 1,818 | 73.66% | 587 | 23.78% | 54 | 2.19% | 9 | 0.36% | 0 | 0.00% | 1,231 | 49.88% | 2,468 |
| Ida | 1,367 | 52.98% | 1,181 | 45.78% | 19 | 0.74% | 13 | 0.50% | 0 | 0.00% | 186 | 7.21% | 2,580 |
| Iowa | 2,230 | 52.58% | 1,907 | 44.97% | 83 | 1.96% | 19 | 0.45% | 2 | 0.05% | 323 | 7.62% | 4,241 |
| Jackson | 2,542 | 48.51% | 2,545 | 48.57% | 35 | 0.67% | 109 | 2.08% | 9 | 0.17% | -3 | -0.06% | 5,240 |
| Jasper | 3,543 | 53.03% | 2,889 | 43.24% | 152 | 2.28% | 91 | 1.36% | 6 | 0.09% | 654 | 9.79% | 6,681 |
| Jefferson | 2,271 | 58.29% | 1,439 | 36.94% | 166 | 4.26% | 17 | 0.44% | 3 | 0.08% | 832 | 21.36% | 3,896 |
| Johnson | 2,758 | 44.84% | 3,314 | 53.88% | 50 | 0.81% | 14 | 0.23% | 15 | 0.24% | -556 | -9.04% | 6,151 |
| Jones | 2,453 | 52.11% | 2,176 | 46.23% | 52 | 1.10% | 23 | 0.49% | 3 | 0.06% | 277 | 5.88% | 4,707 |
| Keokuk | 2,728 | 50.71% | 2,459 | 45.71% | 151 | 2.81% | 40 | 0.74% | 2 | 0.04% | 269 | 5.00% | 5,380 |
| Kossuth | 2,612 | 58.28% | 1,826 | 40.74% | 35 | 0.78% | 9 | 0.20% | 0 | 0.00% | 786 | 17.54% | 4,482 |
| Lee | 4,262 | 46.61% | 4,706 | 51.47% | 73 | 0.80% | 86 | 0.94% | 17 | 0.19% | -444 | -4.86% | 9,144 |
| Linn | 6,938 | 54.22% | 5,493 | 42.93% | 213 | 1.66% | 121 | 0.95% | 30 | 0.23% | 1,445 | 11.29% | 12,795 |
| Louisa | 2,025 | 65.92% | 978 | 31.84% | 46 | 1.50% | 19 | 0.62% | 4 | 0.13% | 1,047 | 34.08% | 3,072 |
| Lucas | 1,757 | 55.41% | 1,267 | 39.96% | 109 | 3.44% | 35 | 1.10% | 3 | 0.09% | 490 | 15.45% | 3,171 |
| Lyon | 1,650 | 58.93% | 1,064 | 38.00% | 29 | 1.04% | 56 | 2.00% | 1 | 0.04% | 586 | 20.93% | 2,800 |
| Madison | 2,425 | 59.54% | 1,404 | 34.47% | 182 | 4.47% | 56 | 1.37% | 6 | 0.15% | 1,021 | 25.07% | 4,073 |
| Mahaska | 3,326 | 48.51% | 3,035 | 44.27% | 395 | 5.76% | 92 | 1.34% | 8 | 0.12% | 291 | 4.24% | 6,856 |
| Marion | 2,625 | 46.12% | 2,739 | 48.12% | 160 | 2.81% | 154 | 2.71% | 14 | 0.25% | -114 | -2.00% | 5,692 |
| Marshall | 3,887 | 61.34% | 1,941 | 30.63% | 309 | 4.88% | 195 | 3.08% | 5 | 0.08% | 1,946 | 30.71% | 6,337 |
| Mills | 1,959 | 55.01% | 1,522 | 42.74% | 55 | 1.54% | 17 | 0.48% | 8 | 0.22% | 437 | 12.27% | 3,561 |
| Mitchell | 1,932 | 65.09% | 988 | 33.29% | 36 | 1.21% | 9 | 0.30% | 3 | 0.10% | 944 | 31.81% | 2,968 |
| Monona | 1,977 | 52.58% | 1,732 | 46.06% | 35 | 0.93% | 15 | 0.40% | 1 | 0.03% | 245 | 6.52% | 3,760 |
| Monroe | 2,686 | 51.58% | 1,979 | 38.01% | 112 | 2.15% | 418 | 8.03% | 12 | 0.23% | 707 | 13.58% | 5,207 |
| Montgomery | 2,553 | 64.44% | 1,282 | 32.36% | 74 | 1.87% | 49 | 1.24% | 4 | 0.10% | 1,271 | 32.08% | 3,962 |
| Muscatine | 3,525 | 49.43% | 3,038 | 42.60% | 85 | 1.19% | 475 | 6.66% | 8 | 0.11% | 487 | 6.83% | 7,131 |
| O'Brien | 1,912 | 57.69% | 1,326 | 40.01% | 36 | 1.09% | 36 | 1.09% | 4 | 0.12% | 586 | 17.68% | 3,314 |
| Osceola | 1,000 | 55.34% | 777 | 43.00% | 18 | 1.00% | 11 | 0.61% | 1 | 0.06% | 223 | 12.34% | 1,807 |
| Page | 3,141 | 60.77% | 1,726 | 33.39% | 196 | 3.79% | 101 | 1.95% | 5 | 0.10% | 1,415 | 27.37% | 5,169 |
| Palo Alto | 1,639 | 52.82% | 1,340 | 43.18% | 59 | 1.90% | 61 | 1.97% | 4 | 0.13% | 299 | 9.64% | 3,103 |
| Plymouth | 2,622 | 53.18% | 2,168 | 43.98% | 99 | 2.01% | 39 | 0.79% | 2 | 0.04% | 454 | 9.21% | 4,930 |
| Pocahontas | 1,857 | 57.42% | 1,315 | 40.66% | 35 | 1.08% | 22 | 0.68% | 5 | 0.15% | 542 | 16.76% | 3,234 |
| Polk | 12,555 | 58.02% | 7,924 | 36.62% | 527 | 2.44% | 601 | 2.78% | 33 | 0.15% | 4,631 | 21.40% | 21,640 |
| Pottawattamie | 6,137 | 51.16% | 5,520 | 46.02% | 169 | 1.41% | 162 | 1.35% | 7 | 0.06% | 617 | 5.14% | 11,995 |
| Poweshiek | 2,794 | 59.73% | 1,661 | 35.51% | 184 | 3.93% | 33 | 0.71% | 6 | 0.13% | 1,133 | 24.22% | 4,678 |
| Ringgold | 1,940 | 61.94% | 1,092 | 34.87% | 83 | 2.65% | 15 | 0.48% | 2 | 0.06% | 848 | 27.08% | 3,132 |
| Sac | 2,366 | 64.02% | 1,230 | 33.28% | 74 | 2.00% | 21 | 0.57% | 5 | 0.14% | 1,136 | 30.74% | 3,696 |
| Scott | 6,845 | 50.75% | 5,845 | 43.33% | 71 | 0.53% | 667 | 4.94% | 61 | 0.45% | 1,000 | 7.41% | 13,489 |
| Shelby | 1,973 | 49.34% | 1,935 | 48.39% | 53 | 1.33% | 33 | 0.83% | 5 | 0.13% | 38 | 0.95% | 3,999 |
| Sioux | 2,697 | 58.10% | 1,891 | 40.74% | 32 | 0.69% | 22 | 0.47% | 0 | 0.00% | 806 | 17.36% | 4,642 |
| Story | 3,790 | 71.05% | 1,195 | 22.40% | 293 | 5.49% | 52 | 0.97% | 4 | 0.07% | 2,595 | 48.65% | 5,334 |
| Tama | 2,774 | 49.78% | 2,550 | 45.76% | 151 | 2.71% | 38 | 0.68% | 59 | 1.06% | 224 | 4.02% | 5,572 |
| Taylor | 2,460 | 58.77% | 1,585 | 37.86% | 94 | 2.25% | 46 | 1.10% | 1 | 0.02% | 875 | 20.90% | 4,186 |
| Union | 2,207 | 52.36% | 1,843 | 43.72% | 124 | 2.94% | 37 | 0.88% | 4 | 0.09% | 364 | 8.64% | 4,215 |
| Van Buren | 2,133 | 53.86% | 1,730 | 43.69% | 77 | 1.94% | 17 | 0.43% | 3 | 0.08% | 403 | 10.18% | 3,960 |
| Wapello | 4,541 | 50.69% | 3,724 | 41.57% | 124 | 1.38% | 551 | 6.15% | 19 | 0.21% | 817 | 9.12% | 8,959 |
| Warren | 2,589 | 58.59% | 1,645 | 37.23% | 163 | 3.69% | 19 | 0.43% | 3 | 0.07% | 944 | 21.36% | 4,419 |
| Washington | 2,631 | 53.81% | 2,119 | 43.34% | 122 | 2.50% | 17 | 0.35% | 0 | 0.00% | 512 | 10.47% | 4,889 |
| Wayne | 2,092 | 52.09% | 1,756 | 43.73% | 119 | 2.96% | 45 | 1.12% | 4 | 0.10% | 336 | 8.37% | 4,016 |
| Webster | 3,658 | 56.52% | 2,374 | 36.68% | 241 | 3.72% | 192 | 2.97% | 7 | 0.11% | 1,284 | 19.84% | 6,472 |
| Winnebago | 1,710 | 76.07% | 489 | 21.75% | 40 | 1.78% | 9 | 0.40% | 0 | 0.00% | 1,221 | 54.31% | 2,248 |
| Winneshiek | 2,767 | 56.79% | 2,008 | 41.22% | 65 | 1.33% | 29 | 0.60% | 3 | 0.06% | 759 | 15.58% | 4,872 |
| Woodbury | 6,587 | 53.52% | 5,222 | 42.43% | 256 | 2.08% | 230 | 1.87% | 12 | 0.10% | 1,365 | 11.09% | 12,307 |
| Worth | 1,433 | 74.33% | 449 | 23.29% | 30 | 1.56% | 16 | 0.83% | 0 | 0.00% | 984 | 51.04% | 1,928 |
| Wright | 2,498 | 72.34% | 866 | 25.08% | 77 | 2.23% | 10 | 0.29% | 2 | 0.06% | 1,632 | 47.26% | 3,453 |
| Totals | 275,209 | 55.62% | 200,771 | 40.58% | 9,837 | 1.99% | 8,287 | 1.67% | 665 | 0.13% | 74,438 | 15.05% | 494,769 |

== See also ==
- United States presidential elections in Iowa
