= Lorenzo Coffin =

American farmer, politician, and campaigner

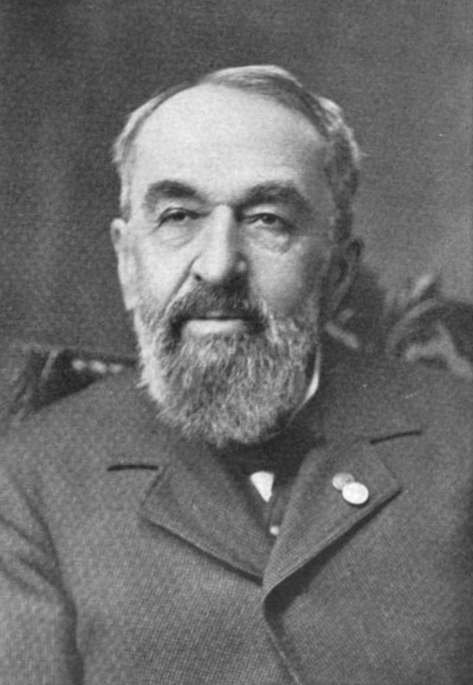
- Born: Lorenzo Stephen Coffin; April 9, 1823; Alton, New Hampshire
- Died: January 17, 1915 (aged 91); Fort Dodge, Iowa
- Education: Oberlin College
- Occupations: Farmer, politician
- Political party: United Christian

Lorenzo Stephen Coffin (April 9, 1823 – January 17, 1915) was an American farmer, politician, and campaigner.

== Biography ==
Coffin was born in Alton, New Hampshire, and attended Oberlin College. He taught in Chester, Ohio, where future U.S. president James Garfield was one of his students.

Coffin moved to Webster County, Iowa, in 1854, where he engaged in farming and social reform causes. He is credited with building the first round barn in Iowa, in 1867. Coffin was an early farm news editor for the Fort Dodge Messenger and served on a variety of boards and associations, including the Iowa State Fair, Iowa Stock Breeders Association, Iowa Farmers' Alliance, Farmers Protective Association, and the National Dairy and Food Association. He was also a leader in establishing farmers' mutual insurance companies, and agricultural extension education.

He served in the Civil War as a minister, from 1862 to 1863.

Coffin served as Iowa's immigration agent, and as the state's first Railroad Commissioner, from 1883 until 1888. He established the Railroadmen's Temperance Movement, was involved with the Railroadmen's YMCA movement, helped establish the Railroadmen's Retirement Home in Highland Park, Illinois, and served as president of its board of directors.

Coffin supported Prohibition in the United States, served on the Iowa Anti-Saloon League, ran as a Prohibitionist for governor of Iowa in 1906, and was the vice-presidential candidate on the United Christian Party ticket in 1908. Coffin was also involved with the prison reform movement. He also established a home for unwed mothers under the auspices of the Woman's Christian Temperance Union.

Coffin adopted Elizabeth Murray in 1912, when she was 36, and this created quite a controversy at the time. Elizabeth was the daughter of Senator Benjamin Franklin and Caroline (Holaday) Murray of Iowa. He did not name her in his will.

== Railroad worker safety ==
Coffin realized that railroad workers were being injured at a high rate using link-and-pin couplers, devices which were locked by a brakeman dropping a pin between two iron loops as they came together. Injuries also often occurred to workers sitting on the top of moving rail cars setting hand brakes. In 1873, Eli Janney had patented an automatic coupler that locked like two hands clasping, and in 1872, George Westinghouse had developed a workable air brake that could stop a train from controls in the locomotive, but the railroads would not adopt these devices since they cost too much money.

In 1886 and 1887, Coffin scheduled a series of tests of the Westinghouse air brake, but the tests failed to produce the desired results. Later in 1887, Coffin scheduled another series of tests, this time on a long grade outside Burlington, Iowa. A Chicago, Burlington & Quincy steam locomotive started downgrade with 50 cars rolling behind it. When the train hit 40 mph, the engineer put on the air. The freight shuddered to a dead stop within 500 feet. The air brakes had worked.

In 1890, Coffin drafted the first railroad safety act and it was passed by the Iowa legislature that same year.

Coffin then turned his efforts to getting a federal law enacted requiring all railroads in the United States to adopt air brakes and automatic couplers as mandatory equipment on all railroad cars. Almost six years later, in 1893, President Benjamin Harrison signed the Railroad Safety Appliance Act, requiring mandatory air brakes and automatic couplers on all US railroad cars. Harrison gave the pen he used to sign the bill into law to Coffin. The law is still on the books. It is estimated that the loss of life of railroad employees was reduced by this reform more than 64% within 10 years of enactment of the law.

== Death ==
Coffin died at Fort Dodge, Iowa, on January 17, 1915, aged 91. He is buried Willowledge Cemetery in Fort Dodge.
