= United Christian Party (United States) =

US political party

- Abbreviation: UCP
- Chairperson: William Rudolph Benkert
- Founded: August 1897
- Dissolved: Late 1920s
- Ideology: Theocracy; Christian conservatism Direct democracy

The United Christian Party (UCP) was a political party that was established in the American state of Iowa in August 1897. Although superficially professing an orientation towards theocracy and a conservative social program in its earliest years, the UCP advocated progressive political reform, promoting direct democracy through implementation of initiative and referendum. By 1904 the organization advocated government ownership of key natural resources and public utilities and an opposition to monopolistic forms of economic ownership in accord with the Golden Rule.

The UCP was the brainchild of Rev. William Rudolph Benkert of Davenport, Iowa, who dominated the organization as its National Chairman throughout its entire existence. After running tickets for President and Vice President of the United States under its own name in the elections of 1900, 1904, and 1908, the UCP was briefly absorbed into a new organization called the American Party in 1909 before resuming its former name.

In 1912 another very short-lived name change was made, this time to Christian Patriots. This change was again quickly reversed and the party's ticket appeared on the November 1912 ballot under its old moniker. The party continued in existence but went on hiatus, failing to run a presidential ticket in the elections of 1916, 1920, or 1924. While intimations were made that a presidential ticket would be fielded in 1928, it seems that this plan came to naught and the party expired.

== Organizational history ==
=== Early history ===
Rev. William Rudolph Benkert was the originator and longtime National Chairman of the United Christian Party.

The United Christian Party was the brainchild of Rev. William Rudolph Benkert, a minister at the Church of God in Davenport, Iowa moved to action by what he perceived to be the nation's declining moral values and called for a return to the Christian moral tradition.

In August 1897 an organizational conference was held in Davenport to establish a political organization through which Benkert might advance his political agenda. A subsequent conference helping to solidify the organization was held in the neighboring town of Washington, Iowa, and planning began almost immediately for a national convention to be held in a major Midwestern city.

In the spring of 1898 Benkert came out with a draft national platform which acknowledged "Almighty God and the rightful sovereign of all men and women, and the Lord Jesus Christ as the ruler among the nations of the earth." Having made this tip of the hat to theocracy, Benkert's program declared the United Christian Party to be a "party of reform" in favor of "whatever tends to make men and women intelligent and virtuous." Such reforms were envisioned to be enabled by the establishment of direct legislation through implementation of the system of initiative and referendum and proportional representation. Benkert's draft platform declared:

We believe that it will be impossible to secure direct legislation without a union of all Christians and all reformers and reform parties, and knowing that there is no higher standard of reform than Christ and no more worthy name to be honored in uniting us than his name, and knowing he is a true friend of those who labor and a friend of the poor and oppressed and that God hears us when we ask for reform in His name, therefore we ask all his followers, regardness of nationality, creed or color, sex or previous politics to join hands with us in His name at the ballot box in making this a government by and for the people through direct legislation of the people ...

=== 1899 Iowa State Convention ===
The Inn at Black Hawk's Watch Tower in Rock Island, Illinois, was the frequent location of conventions of the United Christian Party.

On July 4, 1899, delegates gathered in Des Moines, Iowa for what was touted as the first annual Iowa State Convention of the United Christian Party. The gathering received an official communication from the National Reform Party which requested that the convention name a 10-member delegation to attend a joint convention held at some future time to be determined in the following year to name a ticket for a national campaign in the November 1900 election.

Individuals were selected to comprise a State Central Committee to govern the affairs of the United Christian Party in Iowa, one from each of five congressional districts, with no committee members immediately named for the three other congressional districts in the state. Nominees were selected to represent the party in the 1899 Iowa elections, topped by C. C. Heacock of Brighton for Governor and Rev. John Fitz Randolph Leonard of Ainsworth for Lieutenant-Governor, in addition to nominees for other state offices. A short platform, borrowing heavily from William R. Benkert's previous draft document, was approved.

The choice of Heacock for Governor was regarded as peculiar by at least one Des Moines political analyst. Heacock, the publisher of the Brighton Enterprise, was at the time serving a six-month jail sentence following conviction for criminal libel. Moreover, "it is not claimed that he is a Christian or even a church member," the editor of the Des Moines Iowa Daily Capital scolded.

The UCP subsequently regarded the July 4, 1899 date of the convocation of this convention as its moment of foundation, despite the group's previous organizational history. The slate of the United Christian Party of Iowa appeared on the November 1899 state ballot by virtue of a nominating petition campaign which garnered 961 signatures — enough to meet statutory requirements.

=== 1900 National Convention ===
Rev. Daniel Braxton Turney, 1908 and 1912 candidate of the United Christian Party for President of the United States.

The UCP held a national convention from May 1 to 2, 1900 in Rock Island, Illinois. About 25 delegates were in attendance.

After unanimously approving a resolution to organize a national "Christian political union or party for the application of the Christ principle in state and nation." A second motion to name the organization United Christian Party so as "to conform to the development of the movement in Iowa" was approved by a vote of 20 to 5, with the names Christian Political Union and Christian Union Party drawing minority support.

The convention approved a platform of a socially conservative bent, declaring:

We deprecate certain immoral laws which have grown out of the failure of our nation to recognize [the principle that no law should contravene the Divine law], notably such as require the desecration of the Christian Sabbath, authorize unscriptural marriage and divorce, and license the manufacture and sale of intoxicating liquors as a beverage.

The party further called for a ban on the sale of "cigarettes or tobacco in any form" to minors and for daily reading of the Bible in public schools.

Beyond this conservative agenda, the party declared in its 1900 platform in favor of certain items commonly associated with progressivism, including proportional representation and the system of initiative and referendum, an end to mob violence, and termination of war in favor of mediation of all international disputes. The UCP also expressed support for public ownership of utilities as well as for direct election of the President and Vice President of the United States.

Rev. Silas C. Swallow of Harrisburg, Pennsylvania was unanimously nominated by the convention for President of the United States. Swallow later declined the nomination, however, and party stalwart J.F.R. Leonard was ultimately tapped as the party's presidential nominee in his stead. John G. Woolley of Illinois was unanimously chosen as the new party's nominee for Vice President, but he, too, later declined the nomination, to be replaced by Rev. C. M. Sheldon, who also later declined. David H. Martin of Pittsburgh, Pennsylvania finally assented, becoming the second name listed on the party's November ticket.

The Leonard-Martin ticket collected a grand total of 1,059 votes out of approximately 14 million cast in the November general election.

=== 1904 National Convention ===
The United Christian Party began touting the notion that "Christ's golden rule should be applied to all government by and for the people" in its convention call for its May 1904 National Convention, and made use of similar slogans in subsequent campaigns.

William Benkert remained as the organization's National Chairman and D.H. Martin of Pittsburgh as Secretary. The UCP's 1904 platform included planks in favor of direct legislation; opposing war and mob violence; favoring government ownership of oil wells, coal mines, and public utilities; opposing government profiting from the liquor trade via taxation of alcoholic beverages; and opposing "all trusts and combines contrary to the welfare of the common people."

=== 1908 National Convention ===
In 1908 the United Christian Party nominated Rev. Daniel Braxton Turney of Illinois for President and Lorenzo Coffin of Iowa for Vice President. William R. Benkert remained in place as National Chairman of the organization.

The ticket polled about 12,000 in the November 1908 election.

=== 1909 National Convention ===
Katherine M. Benkert, wife of UCP National Chairman William Benkert, was Secretary of the party in 1909.

National Chairman William Rudolph Benkert issued a call for a "national convention" to be held May 1, 1909 at the Watch Tower in Rock Island, Illinois. This gathering was to be held "to confer with one another concerning the will and kingdom of God in earth, in behalf of humanity, as the assembly led by His Spirit, and governed by His command of love, may we see and act upon."

The convention seems to have increased the organization's association with the personality of its founder, granting to William R. Benkert the right to personally appoint the members of the party's governing 7-member National Executive Committee. The party reconfirmed its dedication to move forward, naming four national organizers to establish state organizations in preparation for the 1912 Presidential campaign, still three years away.

For a time it seemed that the plan for organizational advance was not to take place under the United Christian Party moniker, however, as shortly after the 1909 convention was closed it was announced that the UCP had been absorbed by a new organization called the American Party. This name change proved short-lived, however, and the old organizational name was resumed.

=== 1911 National Convention ===
The United Christian Party returned on May 1, 1911, to the perennial location for its conventions, the Inn at Black Hawk's Watch Tower in Rock Island, Illinois. The convention predictably reconfirmed party founder William Benkert as National Chairman. In a less predictable move, the convention anticipated modern American electoral politics by nominating young minister Daniel Braxton Turney to head the UCP ticket for a second time in the campaign for president at the November 1912 election — still more than 18 months away. Samuel C. Carter of Howard Lake, Minnesota was selected as Turney's 1912 Vice Presidential running mate.

In addition to its perennial calls for obedience to God and the golden rule, the platform adopted at the 1911 National Convention included calls for "a rightful ground and income tax" and an end to "unsettling of business by unjust tariff legislation." "We disapprove of a standing army and the expense of further preparation for war," the platform noted. The convention again yielded plenipotentiary authority to its longtime National Chairman, granting to Benkert the power to unilaterally select State Chairmen in each state.

=== 1912 National Convention ===
William Benkert's call for a May 1, 1912 National Convention of the UCP was issued in February of that year and indicated that the group sought to "end war and capital punishment, and to settle tariff, liquor, trust, and high cost of living questions by direct vote of the people and by the Golden Rule."

The Presidential ticket of Daniel B. Turney and Samuel G Carter named by the 1911 convention was unanimously reaffirmed by the gathering. The United Christian Party name was to be once again terminated, however, with a new name of "Christian Patriots" selected for the UCP. This change appears once again to have been rapidly abandoned in favor of the established party name.

In a post-convention statement to the press, Presidential nominee Daniel Braxton Turney indicated that some 250 delegates, representing 7 states, had been in attendance at the 1912 Rock Island gathering. He declared, with evident hyperbole, that the party was "at least 5,000 percent stronger" than it had been during the 1908 campaign.

The UCP ticket appeared on the ballot in about 20 states in 1912.

=== Final years ===
The United Christian Party remained in existence at least through 1916, holding its annual May Day gatherings in Davenport, Iowa. By decision of the small gatherings, the last of which was held in the home of National Chairman William R. Benkert, no ticket was put in the field for the 1916 campaign. The hiatus proved to be an extended one, with no ticket being put forward in the campaigns of 1920 or 1924.

In 1927 the tenacious National Chairman William R. Benkert announced plans for a conference to name a candidate for the 1928 campaign, with Judge W.S. Kenyon of Iowa Benkert's personal choice for the nomination.

== Conventions ==
Convention	Location	Date	Notes and references
Organizational Conference	Davenport, Iowa	August 7, 1897	
Organizational Conference	Washington, Iowa	1898	
1st Iowa State Convention	Des Moines, Iowa	July 4–5, 1899	Held at Goldstone Hotel. Nominated candidates for Governor of Iowa and other state offices. Subsequently regarded as foundation convention of the organization.
1900 National Convention	Rock Island, Illinois	May 1–2, 1900	Nominated candidates for President and Vice-President of the United States.
1902 National Conference	Rock Island, Illinois	May 1, 1902	Discussion held about possible convocation of a St. Louis international conference in 1903.
1903 National Conference	Rock Island, Illinois	May 1, 1903	Discussion held about possible convocation of an "international religious and economic convention" to be held in St. Louis in 1904.
1904 National Convention	St. Louis, Missouri	May 1–2, 1904	Nominated candidates for President and Vice-President of the United States.
1908 National Convention	Rock Island, Illinois	1908	Nominated candidates for President and Vice-President of the United States.
1909 National Conference	Rock Island, Illinois	May 1, 1909	Put 4 National Organizers into the field for party-building in preparation for 1912 campaign.
1910 National Conference			
1911 National Convention	Rock Island, Illinois	May 1, 1911	Nominated candidates for President and Vice-President of the United States.
1912 National Convention	Rock Island, Illinois	May 1, 1912	Reaffirmed nominations made for President and Vice-President of the United States.
1915 National Conference	Davenport, Iowa	May 1, 1915	
1916 National Conference	Davenport, Iowa	May 1, 1916	Held at home of National Chairman W.R. Benkert.

== Party publications ==
- The Voters' Looking-Glass: And Declaration of the Principles of the United Christian Party. Grove City, PA: Lawrence Printing House, 1901.
- "United Christian Party Platform - 1900," in George E. Plumbe (ed.), The Daily News Almanac and Political Register for 1901. Chicago: Chicago Daily News Co., 1901; pp. 106–107.
