= National Register of Historic Places listings in Van Buren County, Iowa =

Location of Van Buren County in Iowa

This is a list of the National Register of Historic Places listings in Van Buren County, Iowa.

This is intended to be a complete list of the properties and districts on the National Register of Historic Places in Van Buren County, Iowa, United States. Latitude and longitude coordinates are provided for many National Register properties and districts; these locations may be seen together in a map.

There are 20 properties and districts listed on the National Register in the county. Another three properties were once listed, but have since been removed.

This National Park Service list is complete through NPS recent listings posted March 14, 2025.

	Name on the Register	Image	Date listed	Location	City or town	Description
1	Aunty Green Hotel		January 20, 1978 (#78001265)	602 Washington St. 40°41′55″N 91°48′01″W	Bonaparte	
2	Bentonsport	Bentonsport	April 25, 1972 (#72000482)	East of Keosauqua on the Des Moines River; 40°43′32″N 91°51′14″W	Keosauqua	
3	Bonaparte Historic Riverfront District	Bonaparte Historic Riverfront District	April 25, 1989 (#89000313)	Roughly bounded by 2nd St., Washington St., the Des Moines River, and Richard St. 40°41′53″N 91°48′12″W	Bonaparte	
4	Bonaparte Pottery Archeological District	Bonaparte Pottery Archeological District	July 15, 1999 (#99000832)	411–419 1st St. 40°41′51″N 91°48′00″W	Bonaparte	
5	Burg Wagon Works Building	Burg Wagon Works Building	November 14, 1978 (#78001266)	131 S. 2nd St. 40°38′24″N 91°44′30″W	Farmington	
6	Des Moines River Locks No. 5 and No. 7	Des Moines River Locks No. 5 and No. 7	December 7, 1977 (#77000561)	At the Des Moines River; 40°41′51″N 91°48′17″W	Bonaparte and Keosauqua	
7	Eisenhower Bridge		May 15, 1998 (#98000478)	3 miles east of County Road V56; 40°40′43″N 92°07′02″W	Milton	
8	Hotel Manning	Hotel Manning	April 23, 1973 (#73000740)	River and Van Buren Sts. 40°43′47″N 91°57′40″W	Keosauqua	
9	Kilbourn Bridge	Kilbourn Bridge	May 15, 1998 (#98000477)	3 miles west of Iowa Highway 1; 40°47′56″N 91°58′14″W	Kilbourn	
10	Lacey-Keosauqua State Park, Lodge and Picnic Area (Area A)		November 15, 1990 (#90001668)	Off Iowa Highway 1 on the southern bank of the Des Moines River; 40°43′20″N 91°59′39″W	Keosauqua	
11	Lacey-Keosauqua State Park, Picnic and Custodial Group (Area B)		November 15, 1990 (#90001669)	Off Iowa Highway 1 on the southern bank of the Des Moines River; 40°42′57″N 91°58′23″W	Keosauqua	
12	Lacey-Keosauqua State Park, Bathing Area (Area C)	Lacey-Keosauqua State Park, Bathing Area (Area C)	November 15, 1990 (#90001670)	Off Iowa Highway 1 on the southern bank of the Des Moines River; 40°42′31″N 91°58′14″W	Keosauqua	
13	Abner Martin House	Abner Martin House	April 12, 1984 (#84001604)	South of Mount Zion off Iowa Highway 1; 40°46′31″N 91°55′37″W	Mount Zion	
14	Meek's Flour Mill	Meek's Flour Mill	January 27, 1983 (#83000406)	1st St. 40°41′52″N 91°48′15″W	Bonaparte	
15	Samuel and Mercy Paine House		June 29, 2022 (#100007880)	27421 Cty. Rd. J40; 40°43′28″N 91°50′47″W	Bentonsport vicinity	
16	Franklin Pearson House	Franklin Pearson House	May 22, 1978 (#78001267)	Dodge St. 40°44′08″N 91°58′03″W	Keosauqua	
17	Voltaire Twombley Building	Voltaire Twombley Building	July 29, 1993 (#93000655)	803 1st St. 40°43′52″N 91°57′40″W	Keosauqua	
18	Van Buren County Courthouse	Van Buren County Courthouse	November 9, 1977 (#77000562)	904 4th St. 40°44′00″N 91°57′48″W	Keosauqua	
19	Vernon School	Vernon School	September 12, 2002 (#02001024)	26849 South St. 40°43′17″N 91°51′23″W	Vernon	
20	Wickfield Round Barn	Wickfield Round Barn	June 30, 1986 (#86001447)	Off Iowa Highway 2; 40°40′04″N 92°01′23″W	Cantril	

== Former listings ==
Other properties were once listed on the register, but were removed:

	Name on the Register	Image	Date listed	Date removed	Location	City or town	Description
1	Goodin Building		May 15, 2002 (#02000505)	March 7, 2016	N. 106 Front St. 40°38′25″N 91°44′38″W	Farmington	
2	Keosauqua Bridge		May 15, 1998 (#98000476)	September 10, 2008	Iowa Highway 1 over Des Moines River,	Keosauqua	Replaced in 2006.
3	Midway Stock Farm Barn		February 22, 1999 (#99000126)	January 31, 2019	0.3 miles south of the junction of Iowa Highways 1 and 16; 40°48′09″N 91°55′50″W	Keosauqua	Destroyed by a tornado on July 19, 2018.

== See also ==
- List of National Historic Landmarks in Iowa
- National Register of Historic Places listings in Iowa
- Listings in neighboring counties: Clark (MO), Davis, Henry, Jefferson, Lee, Scotland (MO)
