= Lake Sugema =

Man-made lake in Iowa, United States

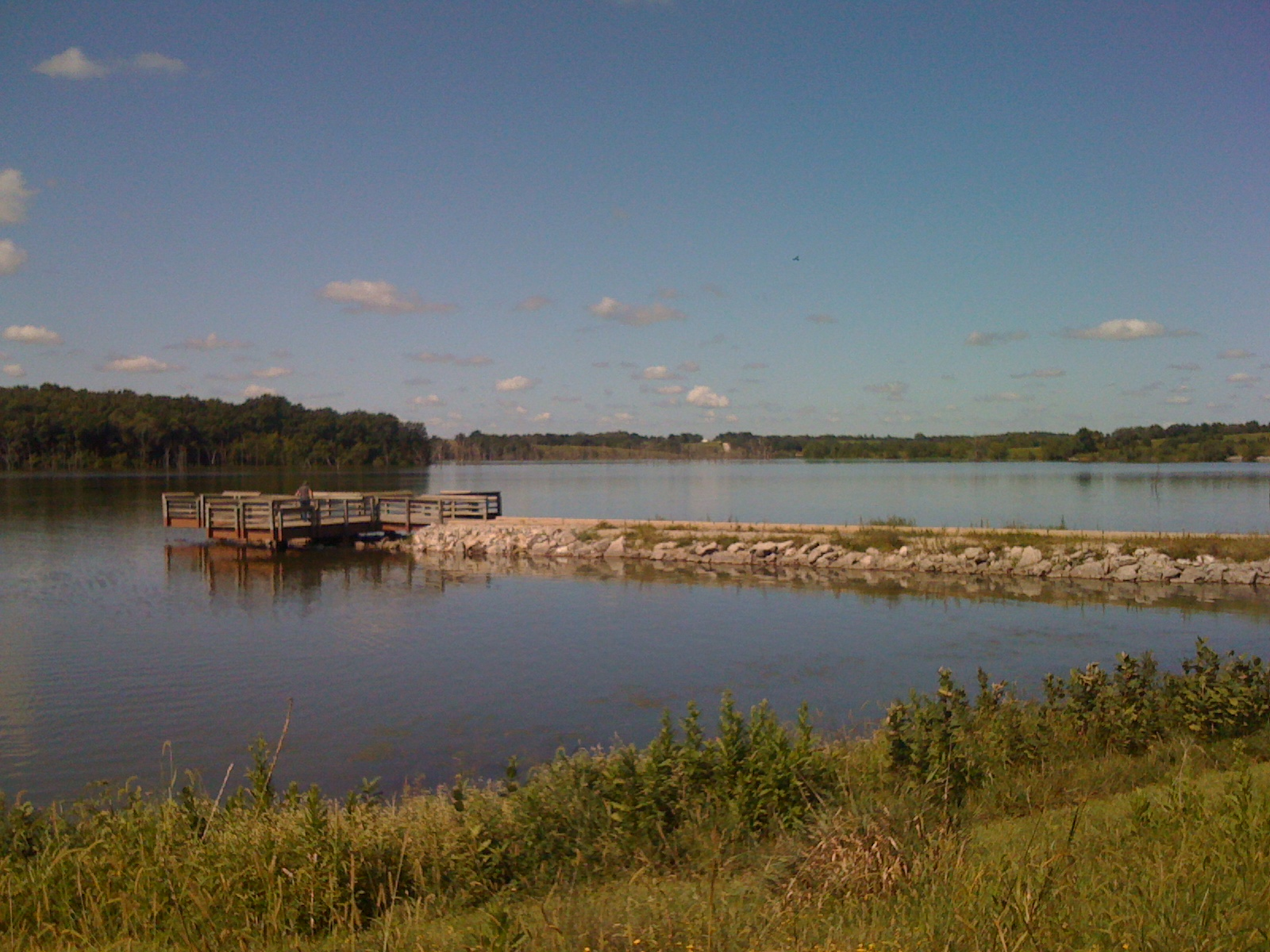
- Lake Sugema

- Location within Iowa Location within the United States
- Location: Van Buren County, Iowa
- Coordinates: 40°41′22.85″N 091°59′39.01″W
- Basin countries: United States
- Surface area: 574 acres (232 ha)
- Average depth: 9.3 ft (2.8 m)
- Max. depth: 34 ft (10 m)

Lake Sugema [Pronounced sōō•jē’•mə](+40° 41' 22.85", -91° 59' 39.01") is a man-made 574-acre (2.32 km^{2}) lake 3 miles (4.8 km) southwest of Keosauqua, Van Buren County, in southeast Iowa, United States. It is located south of the Des Moines River, west of State Highway 1 and north of State Highway 2.

The maximum depth of the lake is 34 feet (10 m), with a mean depth 9.3 feet (2.8 m), and drainage of 11,480 acres (46.5 km^{2}). The lake was designed as a high quality fishing lake. Facilities include parking lots, and 3 hard surface boat ramps with no motor size limit at no wake. There are fishing jetties, an accessible fishing pier for the handicapped, accessible facilities, a picnic area, restrooms, camping facilities, floating boat docks, and wildlife islands.

An asphalt road leads off of Hwy 2 to a large camping area with a shelterhouse, sewer dump station, handicapped-accessible showerhouse, playground, 23 hard-surfaced 50 ft (15 m). camp pads, 8 primitive campsites, 8 slip boat docks, and a boat trailer parking area. Cabins located in the campgrounds are available for rental throughout the year.

Lake Sugema is stocked with largemouth bass, walleye, bluegill, black crappie, channel catfish, and saugeye. The lake has fishing jetties and good shore fishing access. Special fishing regulations require for 12-inch (300 mm) to 18-inch (460 mm) black bass to be immediately released alive.

Extensive planning was done by the Iowa Department of Natural Resources to establish underwater structure that helps fish survive and reproduce. When the lake was constructed, steps were taken to prevent siltation. Besides the hundreds of farm ponds, crop rotations, crop residue management, and other soil saving practices farmers have established in the lake's drainage area, the lake is protected by a series of smaller sediment-control dams.

Approximately 3,000 acres (12 km^{2}) immediately surrounding the lake was purchased by the Iowa Department of Natural Resources and Van Buren County to be managed as a wildlife area. That management is helping to build on the number of wild turkey, deer, squirrel, geese, quail, rabbits, songbirds, and other wild animals. Habitat is also being developed for raccoon, fox, mink, muskrats, and bald eagles, among other wildlife.

The Indian Creek Wildlife area is intended for public hunting, fishing, hiking, bird watching, cross country skiing, picnicking, nature study, primitive camping and other fun in the outdoors.

Shimek State Forest is managed as a multiple-use area for timber products, wildlife habitat and recreation. The 900-acre (3.6 km^{2}) forest includes hiking trails and is available for public hunting.

All those activities are available to the public at Lake Sugema and the 3,000-acre (12 km^{2}) Indian Creek Wildlife Area. The Iowa Department of Natural Resources and the Van Buren County Conservation Board are managing the lake, wildlife, and recreation areas.
