= Flood of 1851 =

Destructive flooding in the Midwest US

The Great Flood of 1851 occurred after record-setting rainfalls across the Midwestern United States and Plains from May to August, 1851. Hardest hit was the State of Iowa, with significant flooding extending to the Lower Mississippi River basin. Historical evidence suggest flooding occurred in the eastern Plains, from Nebraska to the Red River basin, but these areas were sparsely settled in 1851. Heavy rainfall also occurred in the Ohio River basin.

== Nebraska ==
Limited accounts from western regions suggest flooding was bad in eastern Nebraska, but this area was sparsely settled and therefore there is little information. Indirect evidence for flooding can be seen in historical accounts, for example, the flood knocked out a bridge at Shell Creek, Nebraska.

== Iowa ==
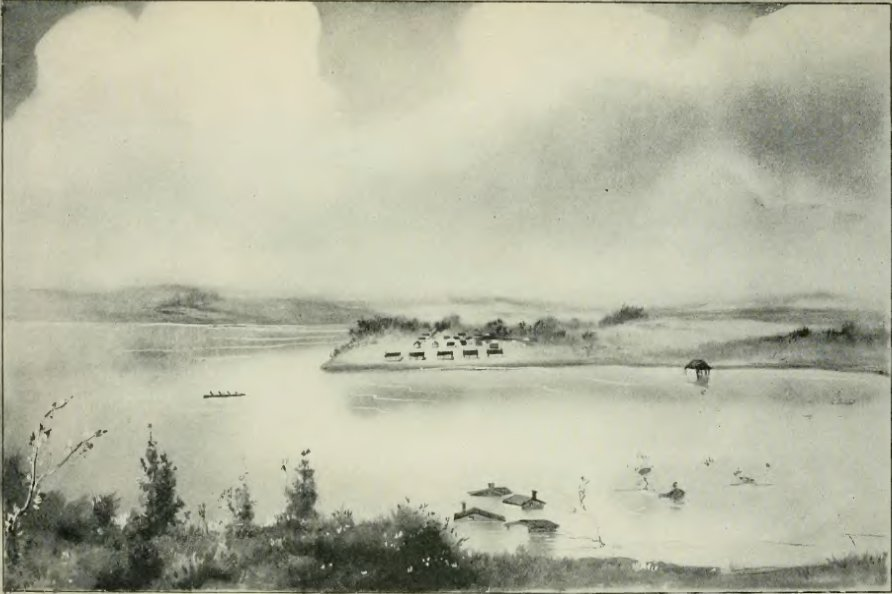
Flood of Des Moines, 1851

Iowa was the state most affected by the Flood of 1851. Flooding in Iowa was probably exacerbated because the Des Moines River basin, where the worst of the flooding occurred, had been settled for less than 10 years. Residents had never previously experienced a major flood, and river towns lacked levees and substantial bridges that could withstand flooding.

In 1851, 74.5 in (191.5 cm) of rain fell in Iowa, a record that holds to this day. The worst flooding occurred May to June in the Des Moines River Basin, and early August in eastern Iowa. Major rivers included the Cedar, Iowa, Skunk, Maquoketa, and especially the Des Moines rivers. Major flooding in 1851 occurred in Bentonsport, Croton, Bonaparte, Des Moines, Eddyville, Farmington, Iowaville, Keosauqua, Muscatine, Oskaloosa, Ottumwa, Red Rock, and Rochester.

The floods affected the low areas of Iowa City. "The first great flood after the settlement of this valley occurred in 1851. That rise came after a wet season that kept the stream about full and one that was unexampled in the violence of its rains deepening to a waterfall early in August of ten inches in twenty four hours. The water rose to the west side of the University campus which was then the state house yard. There were but few houses on the bottoms but they were deluged. In one on the second bench occupied by Mr. T.W. Wilson the water rose two and a half feet expelling the family."

The town of Dudley was destroyed by the flood, many of its residents relocated to Carlisle, Iowa.

=== Destruction of Des Moines ===
The winter of 1850-51 was extremely wet, leaving the town of Fort Des Moines a muddy mess, and the ground completely saturated prior to the Spring rains. On January 14, 1851, a few months before the great flood, Arozina Perkins noted "This is the greatest place for mud I ever saw– I have waded thro' it for several days."

In May to July 1851 much of the town was flooded. "It was during the month of May in this year [1851], that occurred the greatest freshet. The Des Moines and Raccoon rivers rose to an unprecedented height, inundating the entire country east of the Des Moines river. Crops were utterly destroyed, houses and fences swept away. Farms were covered with drift-wood and other debris, so that the entire work of the season was lost".

"The damage done to the farms in the river bottoms was immense. Some were stripped utterly of their fences; fields under cultivation were washed into ruts by the violence of the water; all hope of a crop for one season being destroyed, not only by what was carried away, but by the debris which was left by the subsiding of the river. It was almost impossible to estimate the losses. Roads were rendered impassable-bridges swept away-the mails stopped, and traveling by land to any distance utterly vetoed. Houses were carried away, mills damaged, timber floated off, and all manner of mischief done by the flood." J.M. Dixon blamed the flood for a temporary decrease in the population of the town.

== Flooding on the Lower Mississippi ==
Substantial flooding occurred in the southern Mississippi region. Although the Lower Mississippi normally could easily handle higher rainfalls from the Upper Mississippi (as it did during the Flood of 1993 where water barely rose south of St. Louis), in 1851 heavy rains in the Ohio River basin caused flooding south of St. Louis; this was exacerbated by heavy rainfalls in the Red River basin and Arkansas River basin. The Arkansas and Red River basins were sparsely settled in 1851, so a full account of the severity of flooding is impossible. In St. Louis, Missouri, on June 11, flood waters rose to within 5 feet of the devastating Great Flood of 1844, while at Cape Girardeau, Missouri the flooding was worse than in 1844.
