= Shimek State Forest =

State forest in Iowa, United States

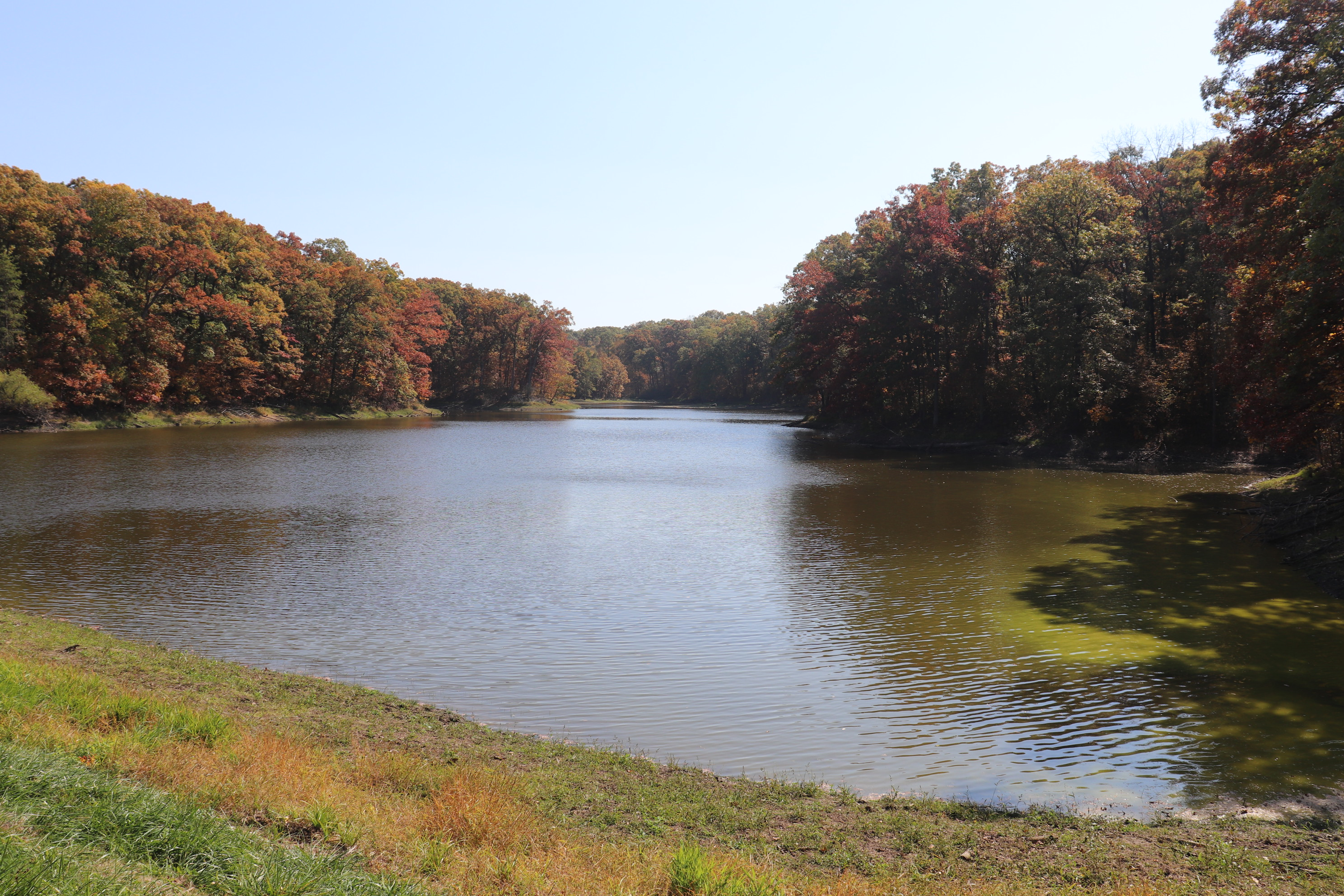
- White Oak Lake, located within Shimek State Forest

- Location within Iowa Location within the United States
- Location: Van Buren and Lee counties, Iowa, United States
- Coordinates: 40°38′2″N 91°40′52″W
- Area: 9,148 acres (3,702 ha)
- Elevation: 700 feet (210 m)
- Established: 1930s
- Named for: Bohumil Shimek
- Administrator: Iowa Department of Natural Resources
- Website: Official website

Shimek State Forest is an Iowa state forest maintained by the Iowa Department of Natural Resources. Its five units are strung along the Des Moines River a few miles above its confluence with the Upper Mississippi River in Lee and Van Buren Counties in the southeast corner of Iowa. Its 9,148 acres (37 km^{2}) contain one of the largest remaining contiguous forests in the state with large stands of mixed oak-hickory forest with about 1,000 acres (4 km^{2}) of planted pine.

The Farmington (2,207 acres (9 km^{2})), Lick Creek (2,866 acres (12 km^{2})), Donnellson (1,330 acres (5 km^{2})) and Croton (1,827 acres (7 km^{2})) units are near Farmington, where the Iowa Bureau of Forestry administrative office is located. The Keosauqua (918 acres (3.7 km^{2})) unit is upriver, opposite Keosauqua and adjoins Lacey-Keosauqua State Park and wildlife management areas. The Croton unit is near the site of the Battle of Athens, the most northerly battle of the Civil War, and the only one fought (in part) in Iowa.

The forest has extensive recreational facilities. Campgrounds, fishing, hunting, hiking trails, horseback riding trails and equine facilities are offered.

Its earliest development was by the Civilian Conservation Corps on exhausted, abandoned farmland. In 1950 it was named for Dr. Bohumil Shimek, a Czech-American naturalist, conservationist, and university professor at the State University of Iowa.

== Sources ==
- Iowa State Forests, Iowa Department of Natural Resources, Retrieved July 27, 2007
- Shimek State Forest, Iowa Department of Natural Resources, Retrieved July 27, 2007
