= Preston Creek =

Stream in Iowa, U.S.

Coordinates: 41°52′23″N 93°51′56″W

Preston Creek is a stream in the U.S. state of Iowa. It is a tributary to the Des Moines River.

A variant name was "Preston Branch". Preston Creek was named after Victor Preston, a pioneer who settled near the creek in the 1850s.
