= Murphy Branch (Iowa) =

Stream in Iowa, U.S.

Coordinates: 41°50′48″N 93°50′18″W

Murphy Branch is a stream in the U.S. state of Iowa. It is a tributary to the Des Moines River.

Murphy Branch was named after Isaac Murphy, an early settler.
