= Van Buren County Courthouse =

Van Buren County Courthouse may refer to:

- Van Buren County Courthouse (Arkansas)
- Van Buren County Courthouse (Iowa), Keosauqua, Iowa
- Van Buren County Courthouse (Michigan)
