= Vernon School =

Vernon School may refer to:

- Vernon School (Verona, California), listed on the National Register of Historic Places (NRHP)
- Vernon School (Vernon, Iowa)
- Vernon District Schoolhouse No. 4, Vernon, Vermont, NRHP-listed
- Vernon County Normal School, Viroqua, Wisconsin, listed on the National Register of Historic Places
- Vernon School (formerly Vernon Elementary School) - Portland, Oregon - Portland Public Schools

== See also ==
- Vernon Elementary School (disambiguation)
