= Eisenhower Bridge =

Eisenhower Bridge may refer to:

- Eisenhower Bridge (Milton, Iowa)
- Eisenhower Bridge (Mississippi River)
