= Vernon Elementary School =

Vernon Elementary School may refer to:

- Vernon Elementary School - Vernon, Arizona - Vernon Elementary School District
- Vernon School (formerly Vernon Elementary School) - Portland, Oregon - Portland Public Schools
- Vernon Elementary School - Vernon, Florida - Washington County School District

== See also ==
- Vernon School (disambiguation)
