= Voltaire P. Twombly =

Medal of Honor recipient

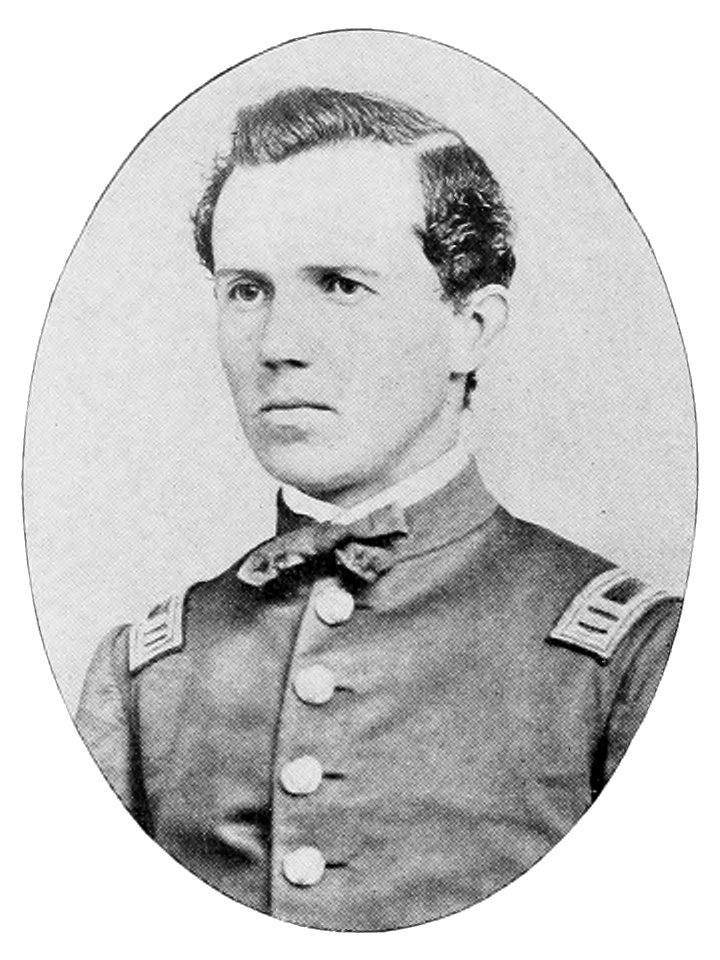
- Born: 21 February 1842 near Farmington, Iowa Territory
- Died: 24 February 1918 (aged 76); Des Moines, Iowa
- Spouse: Chloe A. Funk (m. 1866)
- Military career
- Allegiance: United States
- Branch: United States Army
- Service years: 1861–65
- Rank: Captain
- Unit: 2nd Iowa Volunteer Infantry Regiment
- Conflicts: Civil War: Battle of Fort Donelson; Battle of Shiloh; Siege of Corinth; Second Battle of Corinth; Sherman's March to the Sea; Battle of Bentonville
- Awards: Medal of Honor

Voltaire Paine Twombly (February 21, 1842 – February 24, 1918) was a Union veteran of the American Civil War and a recipient of the Medal of Honor. He received the Medal of Honor for his actions during the Battle of Fort Donelson on February 15, 1862, when he picked up and carried his regiment's national colors after three other members of his regiment were killed or incapacitated by Confederate fire while attempting to secure the flag. Twombly also participated in a number of other engagements in the Civil War, including the Siege of Corinth and Sherman's March to the Sea.

After being mustered out of service in 1865, Twombly attended business school and entered into a number of business ventures. In 1880, he entered politics upon being selected to be the treasurer of Van Buren County, Iowa. He served as the mayor of Keosauqua, Iowa from 1884 to early 1885, and as the treasurer of Iowa from 1885 to 1891.

== Early life ==
Twombly was born to Samuel Twombly and Dorothy Twombly (nee Wilder) on February 21, 1842, near Farmington, Van Buren County, Iowa Territory. His father died in September 1842, leaving Twombly's mother responsible for raising him. While growing up, Twombly was educated at several common schools and at the Lane Academy of Keosauqua.

== Civil War ==
Twombly enlisted in the Union Army on April 24, 1861, after President Abraham Lincoln had called for soldiers to counter the secessionist Confederate States. On May 27, 1861, he was mustered into Company F of the 2nd Iowa Volunteer Infantry Regiment as a private in Keokuk, Iowa. The 2nd Iowa Regiment left for Northern Missouri on June 13, 1861, and was stationed at St. Joseph, Missouri to protect the city's railroad lines. On July 21, 1861, the 2nd Iowa regiment was transferred to Bird's Point, Missouri. The regiment would continue to be transferred throughout Missouri during the remainder of the year, but saw little combat. In October, Twombly was promoted to the rank of corporal and assigned to the color guard. In February 1862, the Second Iowa Infantry Regiment was incorporated into the Army of the Tennessee, which was under the command of Major General Ulysses S. Grant. (Note: The Army of the Tennessee was often called the Army of West Tennessee until October 16, 1862, when it and a number of other military units were merged. Grant maintained his command after the merge had occurred. See Army of the Tennessee#History for further information on the history and naming conventions of the Army.)

National colors carried by Twombly during the Battle of Fort Donelson

On February 15, 1862, the Army of the Tennessee attacked Fort Donelson in Tennessee. During the battle, Twombly picked up and carried his regiment's national colors after the color sergeant and two other corporals had been killed or injured by the enemy. (Note: There is disagreement regarding how many soldiers were killed or wounded attempting to secure the regiment's colors before Twombly obtained it. Brigham and Harlan both state that five soldiers were shot down while attempting to secure the flag. However, this article lists three soldiers as this is the number claimed by Twombly's Medal of Honor citation and a field report issued by Colonel James M. Tuttle, the commander of the Second Iowa during the battle. A possible explanation to this discrepancy is provided by John Bell, a private serving with the Second Iowa during the Battle of Fort Donelson. According to Bell, five people in total had been killed or wounded in rapid succession. However, two of these individuals were lieutenants who were wounded before the incapacitation of the flag bearer and who thus made no attempt to carry the flag.) Twombly was knocked to the ground by cannon fire, but managed to carry the flag for the duration of the battle. For his actions during the battle, Twombly was promoted to sergeant and later awarded the Medal of Honor in 1897. His citation reads:

Took the colors after 3 of the color guard had fallen, and although most instantly knocked down by a spent ball, immediately arose and bore the colors to the end of the engagement.

Twombly carried his regiment's colors during the April 1862 Battle of Shiloh and participated in the Siege of Corinth, Mississippi as an acting second lieutenant. In October 1862, Twombly received a knee injury during the Second Battle of Corinth. He was hospitalized and placed on leave for six weeks to help him recover from the injury. In 1863, Twombly's regiment was formally stationed in Corinth, and engaged in numerous actions against the cavalry forces of Confederate General Nathan Bedford Forrest.

In October 1863, Major General William Tecumseh Sherman replaced Grant as the commander of the Army of the Tennessee. In November 1863, Twombly and the Army of the Tennessee marched northeast into Tennessee; his regiment spent the winter of 1863–64 in Pulaski, Tennessee. Twombly went on to participate in the Atlanta campaign and Sherman's March to the Sea. He was promoted to first lieutenant in July 1864 and to captain in November 1864. While stationed in Savannah, Georgia in January 1865, Twombly was made the assistant inspector general of the Third Brigade of his division.

In early 1865, Twombly and the Army of the Tennessee marched north through the Carolinas and fought Confederate forces in Columbia, South Carolina and Bentonville, North Carolina. Twombly reached Goldsboro, North Carolina by the end of March and was present at the surrender of Confederate General Joseph E. Johnston near Raleigh, North Carolina. Following the surrender, the Army of the Tennessee headed north to Washington, D.C., where Twombly and the 2nd Iowa Infantry participated in the Grand Review of the Armies. Twombly was mustered out of service on July 12 in Louisville, Kentucky and formally discharged on July 20 in Davenport, Iowa.

== Later life ==
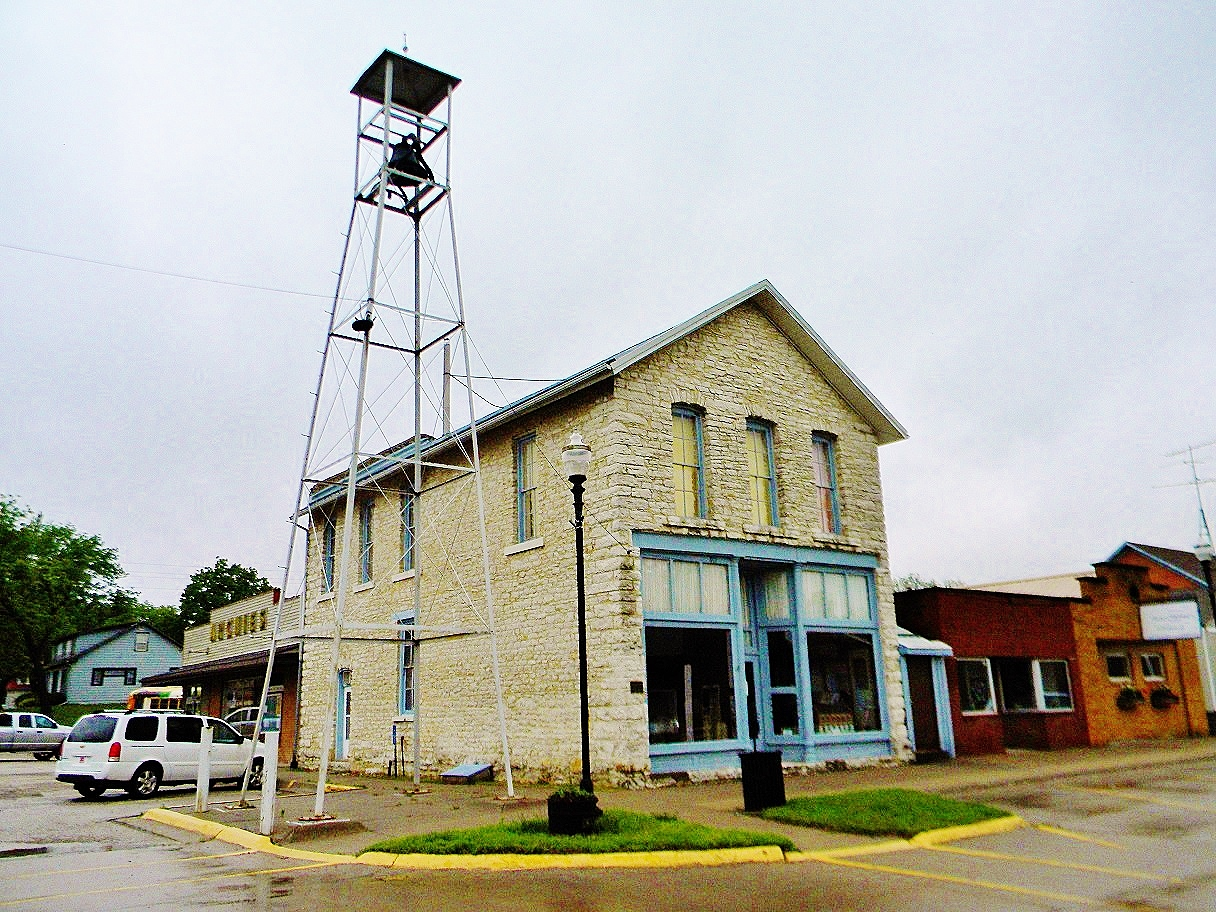
Twombly's former store in Keosauqua, Iowa. The building was added to the National Register of Historic Places as the Twombley Building (sic.) in 1993.

From August to December 1865, Twombly attended Bryant & Stratton's Business College, a commercial school in Burlington, Iowa. After completing his education, he entered into a number of business ventures. From his graduation until December 1867, Twombly worked as a flour merchant in Ottumwa, Iowa. He opened a milling company in Pittsburg, Van Buren County in January 1868, which he ran until April 1876. He later moved to Keosauqua, Iowa where he worked as a merchant until 1880.

Twombly, who had consistently supported the Republican Party since reaching voting age, accepted the position of treasurer of Van Buren County in 1880. He served in that position until 1884, when Twombly became the Mayor of Keosauqua. In January 1885, Twombly was elected the Treasurer of Iowa. He served three terms in the position before stepping down in January 1891.

After his term as Treasurer of Iowa had concluded, Twombly assisted with the creation of the Home Savings Bank of Des Moines. He became the director and president of the bank in June 1891, and maintained the two positions until January 1901. In October 1891, Twombly became the half-owner of the Capital Hill Granite & Marble Works. Twombly stepped down from the position and retired from business in June 1905.

Twombly spent the last years of his life in retirement. He died in his home in Des Moines, Iowa on February 24, 1918, after having suffered from an illness for several months.

== Personal life ==
Twombly married Chloe Funk on May 1, 1866. They had five children, three of whom (their two oldest daughters and youngest son) died in infancy. Their oldest son, William Tuttle Twombly, was born in 1870 and died shortly before his seventeenth birthday on December 28, 1887. Their youngest daughter, Eva Twombly, was born on November 10, 1878. She survived into adulthood, married Clyde Jeffries, and had a child, Marion Louise Jeffries, on January 29, 1910.

Twombly had joined the Free Masons in 1866, and remained a member for much of his life. He was also a member of the Grand Army of the Republic, and had served as the commander of his post.

Twombly worshipped in the Congregationalist Church.

== Publications ==
- Twombly, Voltaire (1897). The Second Iowa Infantry at Fort Donelson, February 15, 1862 : together with an outline history of the regiment from its organization at Keokuk, Iowa, May 27, 1861, to final discharge at Davenport, Iowa, July 20, 1865. Plain Talk Printing House.

== Notes ==
Political offices
Preceded by Edwin H. Conger	Iowa State Treasurer; 1885–1891	Succeeded by Byron A. Beeson
