= Hotel Manning =

Historic hotel in Keosauqua, Iowa, US

- U.S. National Register of Historic Places
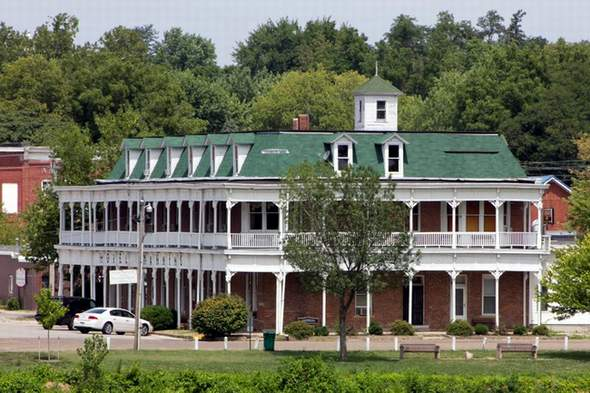
- The Hotel Manning as seen from across the Des Moines River

- Location within Iowa Location within the United States
- Location: River & Van Buren Streets, Keosauqua, Iowa
- Coordinates: 40°43′47″N 91°57′40″W
- Built: 1898
- Architectural style: Steamboat Gothic
- NRHP reference No.: 73000740
- Added to NRHP: April 23, 1973

Hotel Manning is a historic hotel located in Keosauqua, Van Buren County, Iowa, United States, on the banks of the Des Moines River. The hotel's Steamboat Gothic architecture mimics riverboats of the mid-1800s. Hotel Manning was placed on the National Register of Historic Places in April, 1973. It currently operates as a bed & breakfast.

== History ==
The Hotel Manning was constructed in the late 1890s by Edwin Manning. He was one of the founding fathers of Keosauqua, first arriving there in 1837 and later helping plat the town. Manning established a mercantile store in 1839, then expanded his business enterprise by adding a bank to the location in 1854. However two devastating fires in the mid-1890s forced Manning to move his business elsewhere in town. Urged by one of his sons, Manning salvaged the remaining post-fire walls and foundation for the basis of his hotel, adding a second and third story to the structure between 1897 and 1899.

A grand-opening celebration for the Hotel Manning was held on April 27, 1899, with over 300 guests in attendance, and an orchestra.

Over the years the hotel's location next to the Des Moines River proved to be both a blessing and a curse, as the river flooded the Manning on at least four occasions; the most significant of these was in 1901 when the hotel was inundated by seven feet of water. The year 1901 proved a double tragedy with the death of Edwin Manning. The Manning family continued to operate the hotel for another two decades until hard times in the rural farm economy in the mid-1920s forced the Manning bank into receivership and Hotel Manning sold with its other assets.

In the 1940s local restaurateur Mable Miller purchased the hotel and operated it for the next forty-plus years. Under Miller's ownership Hotel Manning was operated largely as a boarding house. During the 1960s she expanded the business by adding a single-level annex. When Van Buren County's economy became more tourism-based beginning in the 1970s, Miller secured the Hotel Manning a place on the National Register of Historic Places and also received a Federal grant to undertake a major restoration.

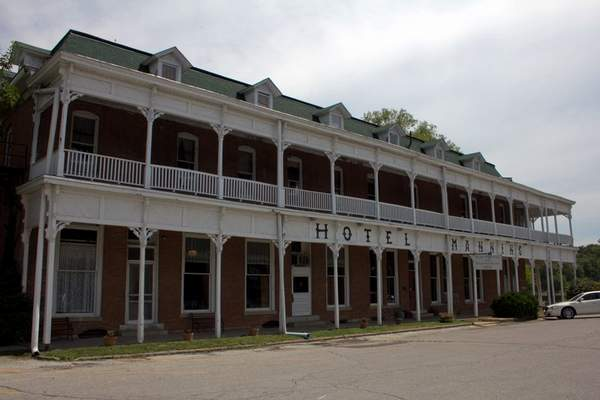
A closeup of Hotel Manning and its Steamboat Gothic architecture

On April 2, 2018, the Hotel Manning Preservation Group, LLC, a group of 70 community investors, purchased the Hotel.

== Hotel Manning today ==
The Manning today operates as a bed & breakfast with most business coming from tourism, hunters, and sport fishermen. It has been restored to appear much as it did at the turn of the 20th century with the lobby and guest rooms filled with period antiques. Sixteen rooms, eight with private bath, are available in the Manning along with a three-bedroom suite. Seasonally, a Sunday buffet is open to the public. The nearby Standard Motel, the 1960s-era addition, and a further two-story addition constructed in 1993 known as the Riverview Inn, offer nineteen additional rooms. They are not period-specific like the Manning, featuring modern conveniences like cable television, high speed internet, and microwaves. In recent years other businesses have also operated out of the Hotel Manning complex, including a tanning salon and travel agency.

== See also ==
- National Register of Historic Places listings in Van Buren County, Iowa
