= Old Main (Iowa Wesleyan University) =

- U.S. National Register of Historic Places
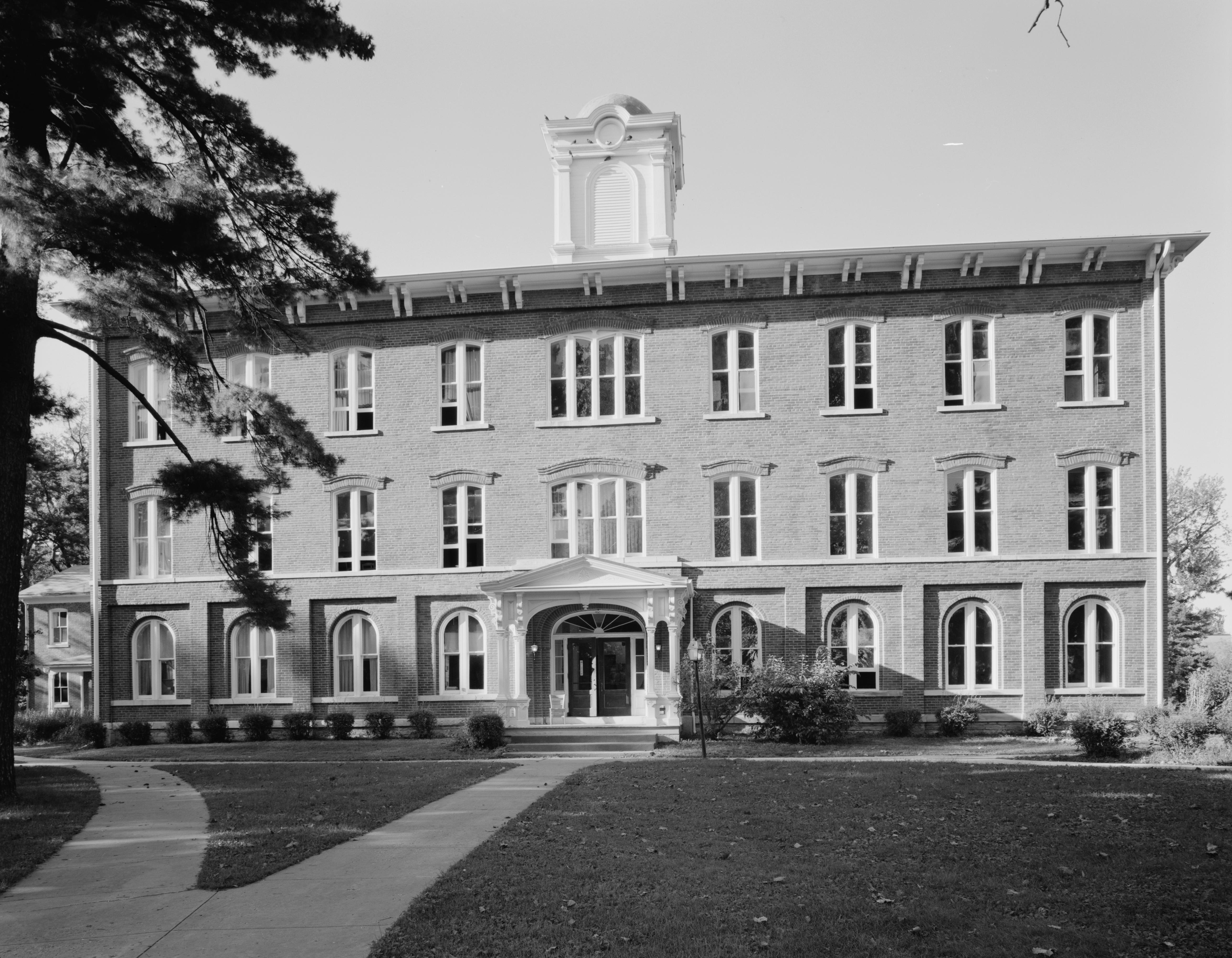

- Location within Iowa Location within the United States
- Location: Iowa Wesleyan University campus Mount Pleasant, Iowa
- Coordinates: 40°58′26.4″N 91°33′11.6″W
- Built: 1854
- Built by: Benjamin Franklin Pearson
- NRHP reference No.: 73000727
- Added to NRHP: March 26, 1973

Old Main is a historic building located on the Iowa Wesleyan University campus in Mount Pleasant, Iowa, United States. Built in 1854, when James Harlan was the college's president, it is the second building constructed on the campus after Pioneer Hall. It is believed that Old Main was the first genuine collegiate building built in Iowa. The bricks for the building were manufactured locally by Benjamin Franklin Pearson of Keosauqua, Iowa, who also was responsible for some of the building's construction. The three-story building has modified classical features. It was designed to have classrooms on the first two floors and the library, natural history museum and chapel on the third floor. The building is capped with a hip roof with bracketed eaves, and a wooden cupola with a low dome painted gold.

The International P.E.O. Sisterhood was founded in the building. It was listed on the National Register of Historic Places in 1973.
