= Iowaville, Iowa =

- Ghost town
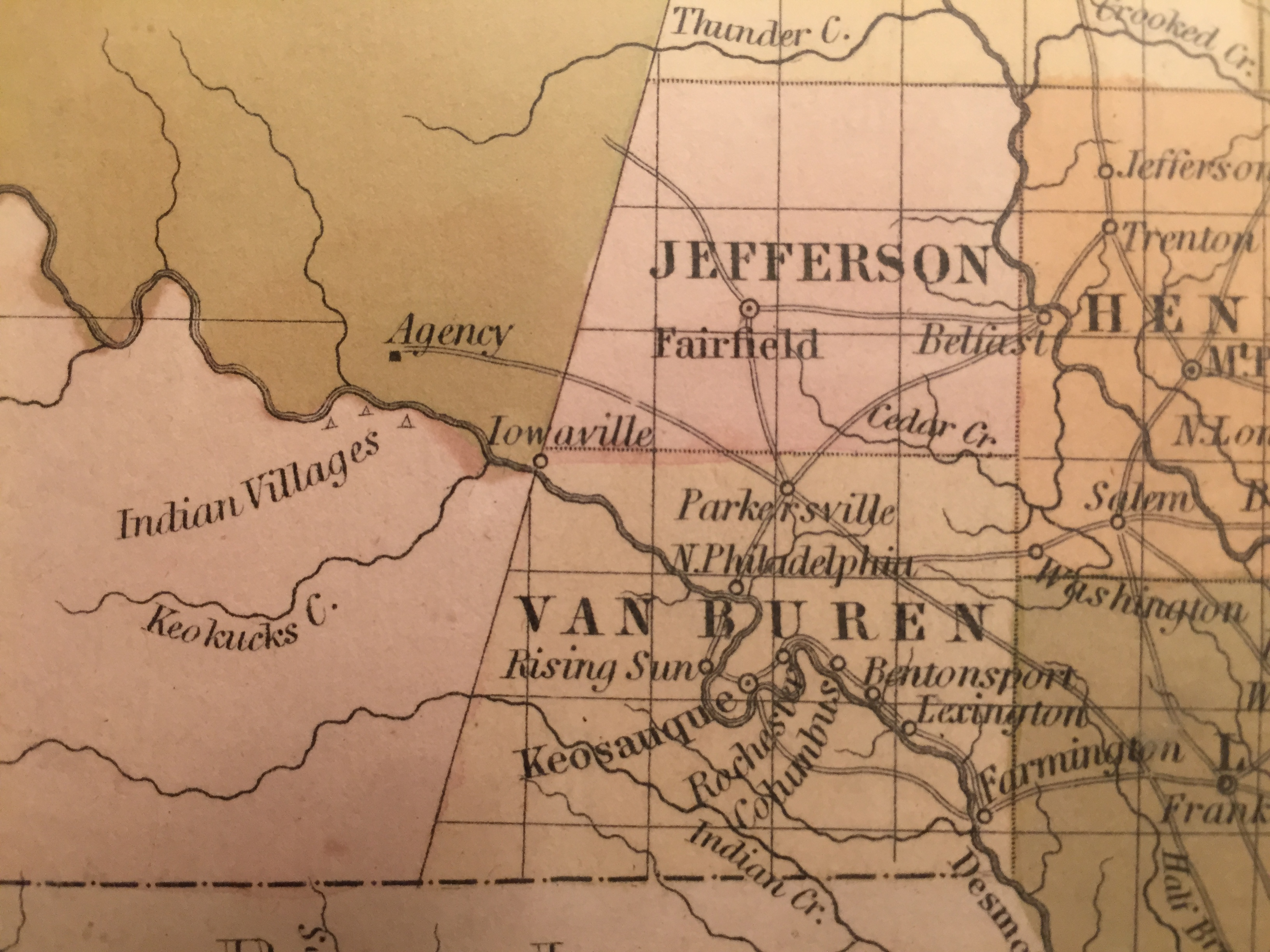
- Map of Iowaville in Van Buren County c.1845 Carey and Hart
- Interactive map of Iowaville, Iowa
- Coordinates: 40.879187°N 92.177124°W
- Country: United States
- State: Iowa
- County: Van Buren
- Time zone: UTC-6 (Central (CST))
  - Summer (DST): UTC-5 (CDT)
- Area code: 319

Iowaville was a small town on the lowland near the northeast bank of the Des Moines River, near the line between Davis and Van Buren counties, and between present-day Eldon and Selma, Iowa, United States. It was established about 1838 near the site of earlier trading posts. Iowaville is now farmland with almost nothing to show the town location, but it is an important Iowa archaeological site.

The area around the town site had long been used by the Ioway Indians. The residents of Iowaville were frequent visitors to Fort Madison, 1808–1813, the first U.S. Army post in the Upper Mississippi. Iowaville was attacked in the 1810s or early 1820s, perhaps by the Sauk under leadership of Pashepaho and Black Hawk, but there is also evidence it was attacked by the Dakota or may have been abandoned because of smallpox.

Keokuk made his home near there for a time.

Trader and settler John Jordan operated near here from 1837 and platted the town in 1838. Iowaville was badly flooded during the Flood of 1851. The town was prosperous for a time, with a peak population of perhaps 200, but it declined rapidly after the railroad came to nearby Eldon.

There was a post office established in Iowaville on January 11, 1840. It closed on September 26, 1870.

Black Hawk spent his last few years living in the area.
