= Burg Wagon Works Building =

- U.S. National Register of Historic Places
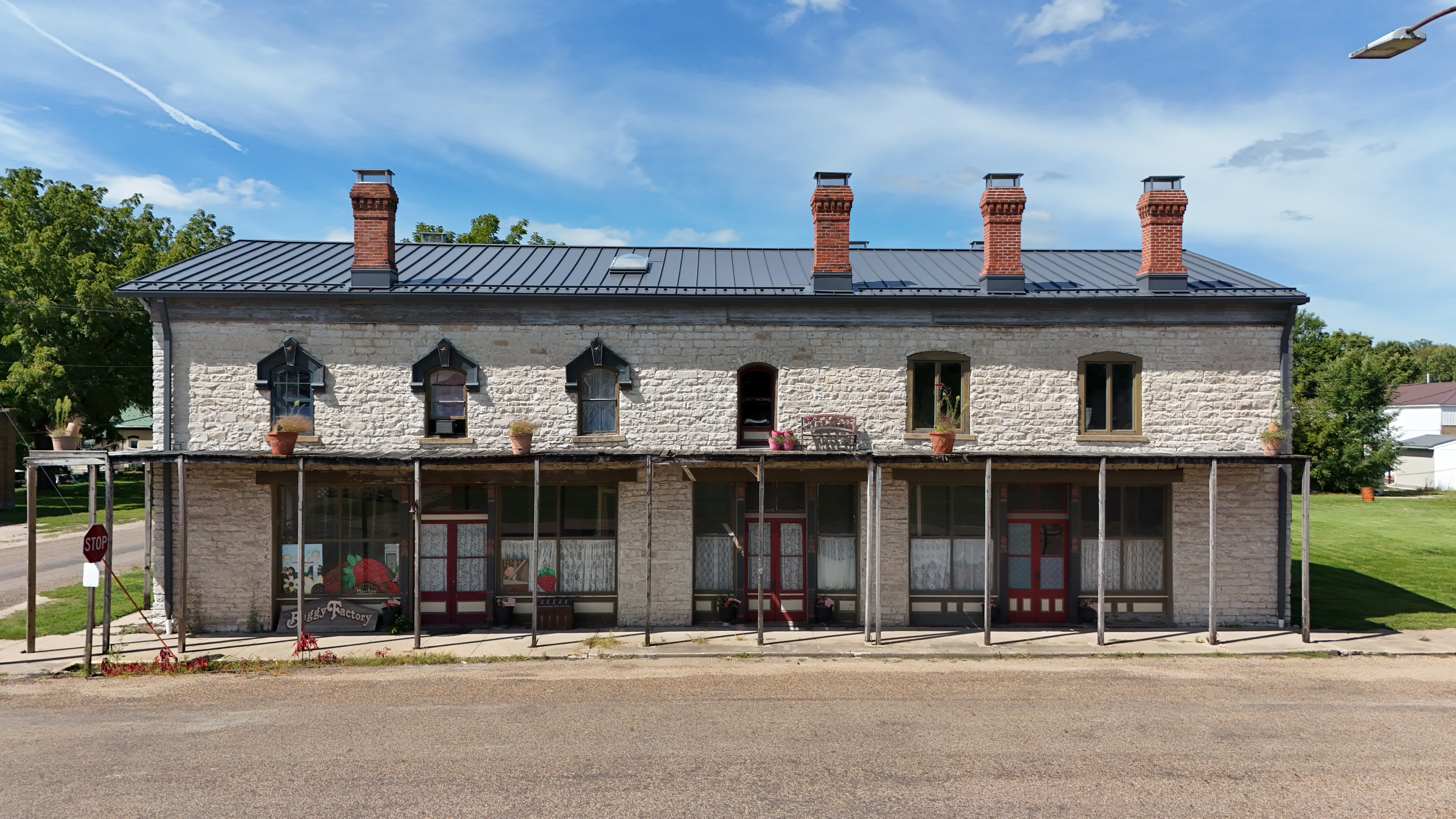
- Burg Wagon Works in 2024

- Location within Iowa Location within the United States
- Location: 131 S. 2nd St. Farmington, Iowa
- Coordinates: 40°38′22″N 91°44′33″W
- Area: less than one acre
- Built: 1867-1868
- Built by: Lewis Burg
- NRHP reference No.: 78001266
- Added to NRHP: September 12, 2002

The Burg Wagon Works Building is a historic building located in Farmington, Iowa, United States. A native of Bavaria, Lewis Burg settled in Burlington, Iowa 1853 where he joined his brother John's wagon works. He moved to Farmington and set up his own shop in 1865. He had this two-story stone building constructed from 1867 to 1868. By 1869 he had competition in town, but he maintained the largest shop nearly doubling his production in the next ten years. Burg sold the building in 1892, and is thought to have moved to Dallas City, Illinois to manufacture automobiles. The building has been used for a variety of purposes over the years. Apartments were built on the second floor around the turn of the 20th century. The first floor has housed different mercantile businesses. The building was listed on the National Register of Historic Places in 1978.
