= Franklin Pearson House =

Historic house in Iowa, United States

- U.S. National Register of Historic Places
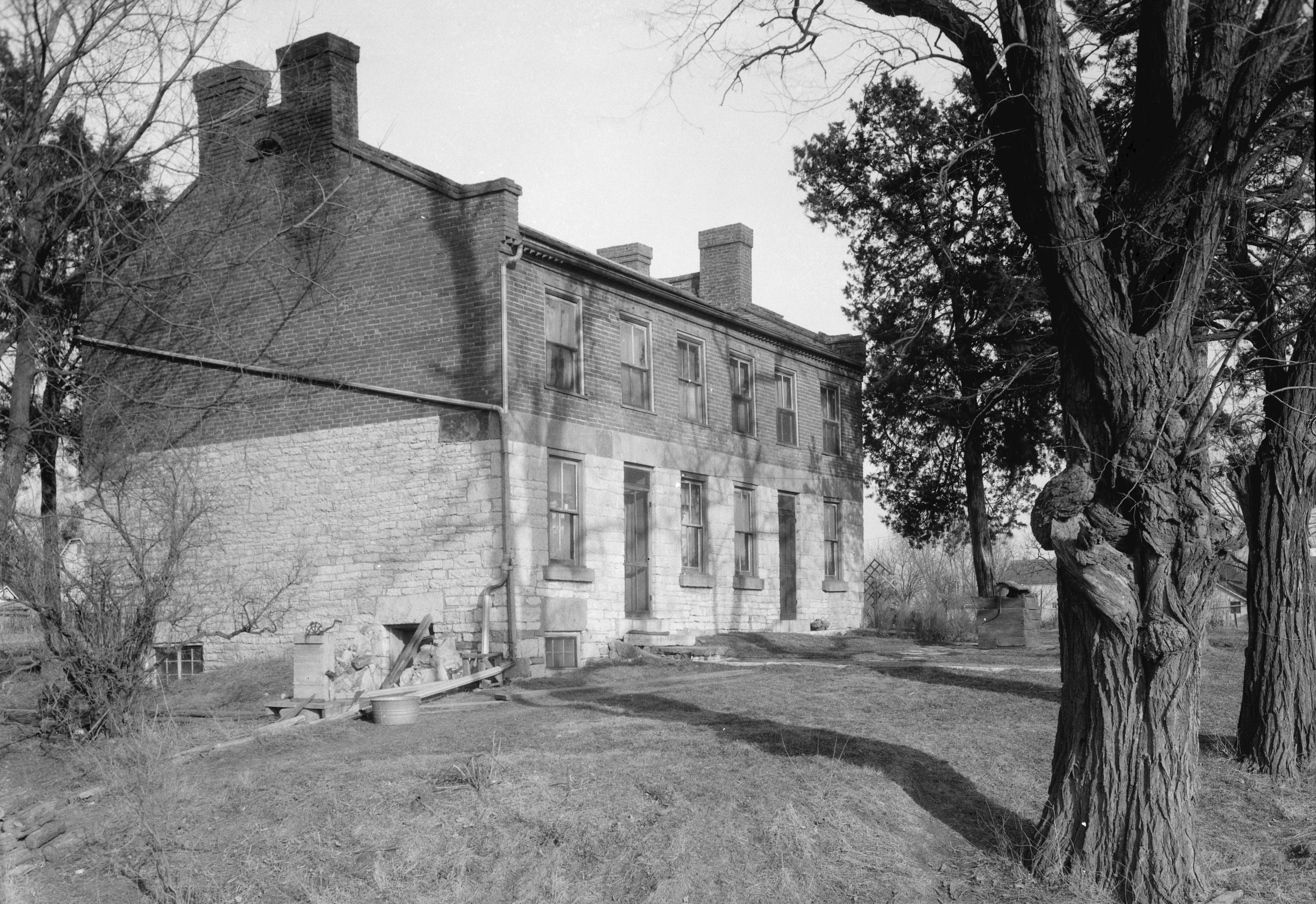

- Location within Iowa Location within the United States
- Location: Dodge St. Keosauqua, Iowa
- Coordinates: 40°44′08″N 91°58′04″W
- Area: less than one acre
- Built: 1845
- Built by: Franklin Pearson
- Architectural style: Georgian
- NRHP reference No.: 78001267
- Added to NRHP: May 22, 1978

The Franklin Pearson House is a historic house located on Dodge Street in Keosauqua, Iowa and is a confirmed stop on the Underground Railroad.

== Description and history ==
Benjamin Franklin Pearson was a Maryland native who settled in Iowa in 1835 after it was opened to settlement. He had a storied service in the Union forces during the American Civil War. Afterward, he returned to Iowa and became a master stone mason who built this house and other structures in southeastern Iowa, including Old Main at Iowa Wesleyan University.

He was a devout Methodist who hosted church services on the upper floor of his house. Pearson was also an abolitionist and involved with the Underground Railroad. The home he built for his family in Keosauqua, Iowa in 1845 was a two-story structure, and is a rare vernacular Georgian style house in Iowa. Pearson imported the style from his native Maryland. The exterior of the first story is stone while the second is brick. Unbeknownst to those around him, he also included a hidden cellar. It was there that slaves escaping the Confederacy were successfully hidden on their journey North.

A tornado in 1967 destroyed the chimneys and most of the brick from the east wall. Ironically, it was rebuilt using brick from a place of worship known locally in those days as the "Negro Church", a structure that had been destroyed in the same storm. The church was a landmark dating back to a time during Reconstruction and well into the 20th century when the black population of Keosauqua was sizable. A gift, perhaps, to a man who helped them in their time of greatest need.

The house was listed on the National Register of Historic Places on May 22, 1978.
