= Van Buren County Courthouse (Iowa) =

- U.S. National Register of Historic Places
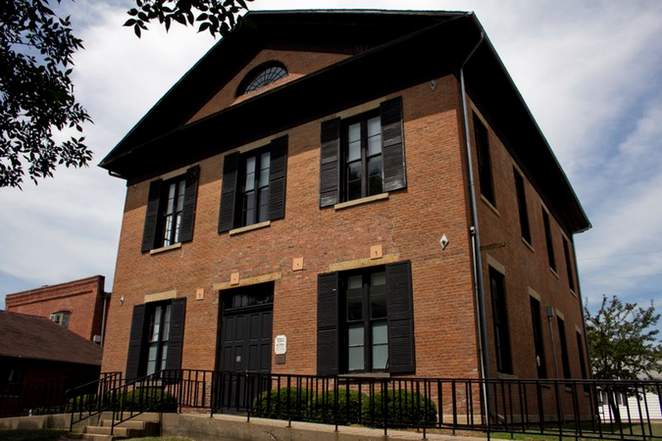

- Location within Iowa Location within the United States
- Interactive map showing the location for Van Buren County Courthouse
- Location: 904 4th St. Keosauqua, Iowa
- Coordinates: 40°44′0″N 91°57′48″W
- Area: less than one acre
- Built: 1843
- Built by: James Hall; John Fainnan; Edwin Manning
- Architectural style: Greek Revival
- MPS: County Courthouses in Iowa TR
- NRHP reference No.: 77000562
- Added to NRHP: November 9, 1977

The Van Buren County Courthouse located in Keosauqua, Iowa, United States, was built in 1843. It was listed on the National Register of Historic Places in 1977 as a part of the County Courthouses in Iowa Thematic Resource. It is the only building the county has used as its courthouse, and it is the oldest courthouse in Iowa. In 1845 the courthouse served as the location for a trial resulting in the first death penalty in Iowa history.

== History ==
Van Buren County was established on December 7, 1836. The first meeting of the county court and officials was held the following spring in Farmington, Iowa. However, the Wisconsin territorial legislature—which Iowa was a part of until 1838—changed the county seat to the village of Rochester in December, 1837. Territorial Governor Henry Dodge vetoed the change so an election was held in 1838 to settle the matter. The voters chose Keosauqua, which was then required to supply $5,000 in materials and land for the construction of a county courthouse.

The Van Buren County commissioners accepted a bid of $6,500 from James Hall and John Fairman on May 30, 1840, for construction of the courthouse, with Sewall Kenny and Henry King named as building agents. However, early the following January the commissioners relieved the agents of their duties and named Edwin Manning to finish the construction. This was done in September 1843 at a final cost of $6,712. Edwin Manning would later build the Hotel Manning in Keosauqua, also listed on the National Register of Historic Places.

== Architecture ==
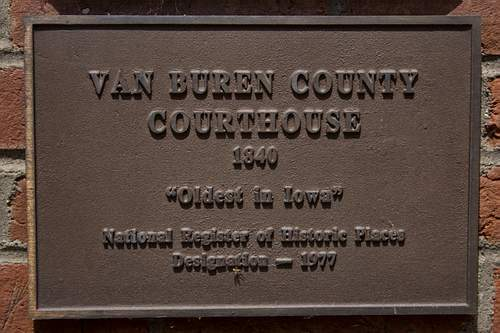
Plaque on the Van Buren County courthouse noting its historic status.

The finished Greek Revival-style building was one of the largest west of the Mississippi River for that time period. The style is also typical of Iowa's pre-Civil War courthouses. The framework of the courthouse was constructed of native oak from the area as well as locally manufactured brick for the exterior. Iron truss rods were installed in the building to provide further strength. The exterior walls are 22 inches (56 cm) thick on the first floor and 18 inches (46 cm) on the second floor. Locally harvested walnut completed most of the interior, trim, and two circular staircases. Originally the courthouse included a 10 feet (3.0 m) square tower rising another 16 feet (4.9 m) above the second floor however it was removed in the mid-1800s. The circular walnut staircases were also removed and replaced by the single one presently in use.

=== The courthouse today ===
Still in use, the Van Buren County courthouse received a major interior restoration over a two-year period between 1981 and 1983, improving safety while preserving much of the original look and feel. The exterior of the building was renovated in 1997 and included a ramp to comply with the Americans with Disabilities Act. While still serving as an active courtroom, the building also features historical displays, photos of former judges, portraits, and maps. The county office building, located south of the courthouse, is also well over a century old having been constructed in 1896.
