= Lacey-Keosauqua State Park =

State park in Iowa

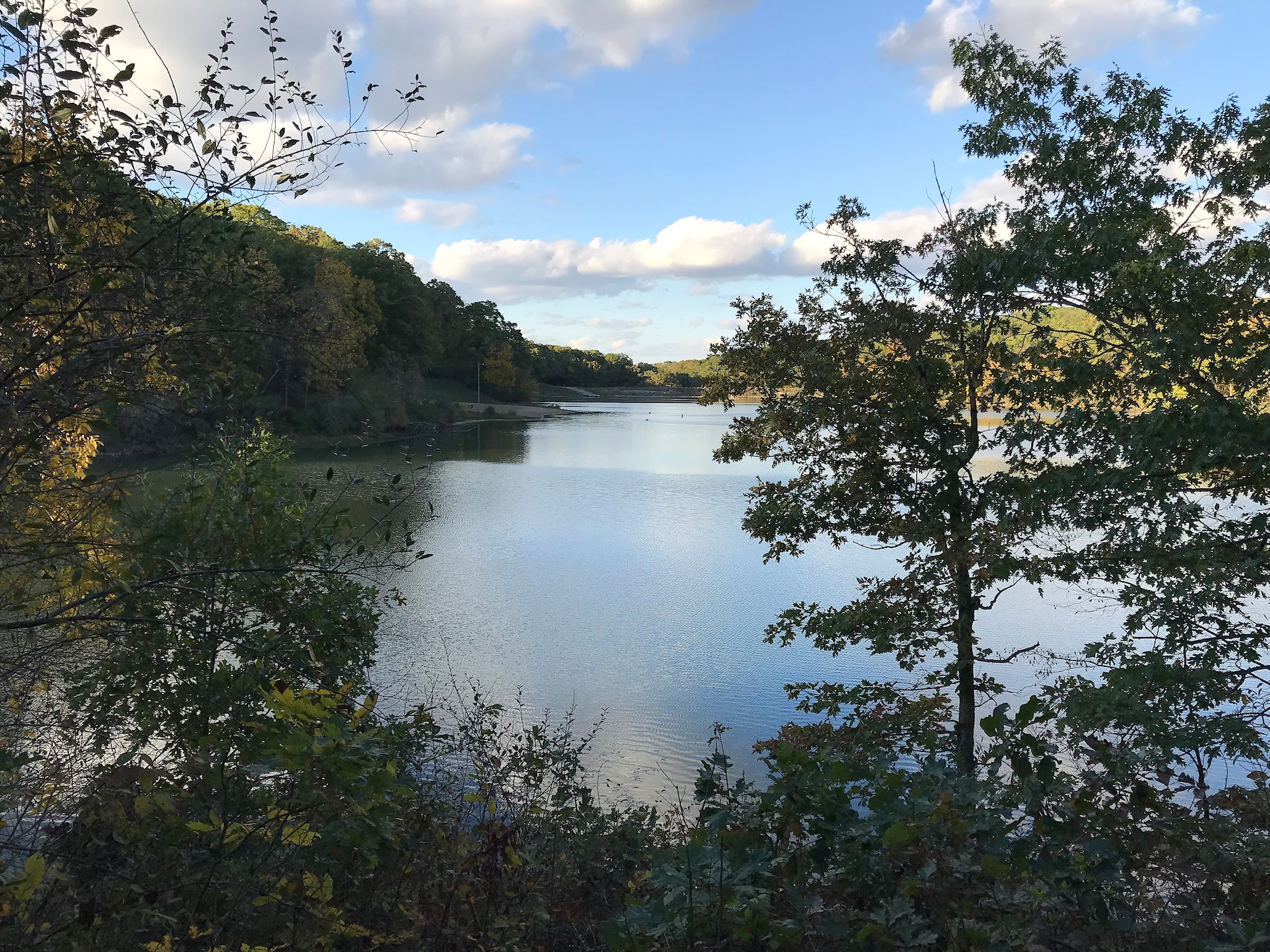
- Lacey Lake

- Location within Iowa Location within the United States
- Location: Van Buren County, Iowa, United States
- Coordinates: 40°43′06″N 91°59′15″W
- Area: 1,653 acres (669 ha)
- Elevation: 568 ft (173 m)
- Established: 1921
- Administrator: Iowa Department of Natural Resources
- Website: Official website
- Lacey-Keosauqua State Park; Lodge and Picnic Area (Area A); Picnic and Custodial Group (Area B); Bathing Area (Area C)
- U.S. National Register of Historic Places
- U.S. Historic district
- Built: 1933-1936
- Built by: Civilian Conservation Corps
- Architect: Central Design Office, Ames
- Architectural style: Rustic
- MPS: CCC Properties in Iowa State Parks MPS
- NRHP reference No.: 90001668; 90001669; 90001670
- Added to NRHP: November 15, 1990

Lacey-Keosauqua State Park is a 1,653-acre (669 ha) public recreation area located along the Des Moines River southwest of Keosauqua, Iowa, in Van Buren County, United States. Park offerings include historic sites, hiking trails, swimming, fishing and camping. Three park areas were named nationally recognized historic districts and listed on the National Register of Historic Places in 1990.

== History ==
A group of local citizens contributed $64,000 to buy the land, which had been a large farm. The state acquired the land in 1920, and dedicated it as Big Bend Park the following year. It was renamed in 1926 in honor of John Fletcher Lacey, an American Civil War veteran who went on to serve in both the Iowa House of Representatives and the United States House of Representatives, representing Iowa's 6th congressional district. He was noted for conservation legislation while in Congress and was instrumental in establishing the state park system in Iowa. By 1933 a lodge and a golf course, no longer extant, had been developed in the northwest part of the park.

Several government agencies worked at Lacey-Keosauqua to develop the park in the 1930s and the 1940s. The Civilian Conservation Corps (CCC) Company 770 arrived in the park on May 28, 1933. They worked with the National Forest Service landscaping and with soil erosion control along the steep river bluffs until October 11 of the same year, when it was transferred to the National Park Service. They continued their work in the park until October 23, 1934. Company 770's primary responsibility was the construction of the earthen dam and concrete spillway to create the man-made lake. CCC Company 2719 began work on August 20, 1934, and stayed until October 1935. Most of the trails were completed in 1934. The National Forest Service and both companies of the CCC built the various buildings. The Works Progress Administration (WPA) worked in the park building the foot and vehicle bridges and other small projects from December 1935 to April 1936. A National Park Service Camp began working in the park in June 1936 and remained until April 1937 or possibly into early 1938. The state of Iowa built two of the six existing cabins between 1940 and 1942 and completed the others sometime after 1942.

On November 15, 1990 three areas of the park were listed as historic districts on the National Register of Historic Places. At the time of its nomination it contained 37 contributing properties. Area A contains an entryway, a lodge and picnic area, Area B includes another picnic area and custodial facilities, and Area C contains the bathhouse and other features along the lake. All of the historic structures in the park were designed in the rustic style by the Central Design Office in Ames. The park was part of a larger study of Iowa's state parks called the "Civilian Conservation Corps Properties in Iowa State Parks: 1933-1942".

=== Lodge and Picnic Area (Area A) ===
Area A is located in the northwest corner of the park. Its historic buildings and structures include the gatehouse and portals, a regulatory sign, lodge, pump house, and picnic shelter. Two rubble limestone portals flank the entrance road. The south portal is nearly square and is 8.3 feet (2.5 m) tall. The north portal is T-shaped and stands 9 feet (2.7 m) tall. The sign stands in front of the north portal. The rectangular, random rubble limestone gatehouse is separate from the portals and is located to the south of them. The lodge is a two-story, L-shaped building that is located on the main road just beyond the portals.

The main section of the structure is covered with weatherboard, and an addition is covered with uncoursed rubble. A wrap-around porch composed of stone walls covers the east side of the building and parts of the adjoining north and south facades. The underground pump house lies to the east of the lodge and is marked by its double-wooden doors. The picnic shelter is one-quarter of a mile to the southeast of the pump house. The shelter is composed of uncoursed ashlar limestone, and it is built into the side of a hill. Restrooms are located in the enclosed rear portion of the structure, and the north side is open.

=== Picnic and Custodial Group (Area B) ===
Area B is located in the north central part of the park. Its historic buildings and structures include the custodian's residence, a picnic shelter, a water fountain, two latrines, and several retaining walls at the entrance of the picnic shelter. Located in a clearing off the park road, the custodian's residence is a single-story, rectangular structure composed of rough-faced, coursed ashlar limestone. The gable ends are closed with weatherboard. It is built over a limestone basement.

The picnic area is located to the northeast of the custodian's residence. Coursed ashlar limestone encloses the rear of the shelter, and includes a fireplace. Two latrines, of coursed rubble limestone and similar in construction, flank the shelter. The water fountain is located southwest of the shelter. The entrance to the picnic area is marked by four square cement posts that are flanked by two coursed ashlar stone walls. Two 408-foot (124 m) long stone walls are located in the center of the grass parking lot.

=== Bathing Area (Area C) ===
Area C is located to the south of Area B near the center of the park. It is the bathing area and it includes the lake, dam, spillway, trail surrounding the lake, the check dams and footbridge along this trail, bathhouse, beach, and pump house. Two bridges in this historic district are considered non-contributing to the historical nature of the district. The 30-acre (12 ha) lake is fed by a spring that is damned at the north end of the lake. The earthen dam with a concrete core is 450 feet (140 m) in length. Rock riprapping protects its south side from erosion. A 300-foot (91 m) concrete spillway curves to the west. A 55-foot (17 m) arched, steel bridge (non-contributing) spans across the spillway. Most of the lake is surrounded by a 3.25-mile (5.23 km) trail. Ten check dams that prevent soil erosion into the lake are located along the trail. They are composed of random rubble and concrete walls. Two coursed rubble limestone footbridges are located south of the lake. One of the two bridges is a WPA structure, and is non-contributing. The bathhouse is located near the top of a hill on the west side of the lake. The single-story uncoursed ashlar limestone building was built on concrete footings. It features a central gable with a cupola and two flanking wings. Concrete steps with random rubble side walls lead down to the beach on the lake. An uncoursed ashlar limestone pump house is built into the hillside. It has a flat roof that is also composed of limestone.

== Land use ==
Nineteen burial mounds from the ancient Woodland Period are located in the northwest corner of the park. Park visitors are granted access to them. The lake in the center of the park is used for swimming, boating, and fishing. Fishing is also permitted on the Des Moines River. The park also features trails along the lake, and along the river bluffs and valleys for hiking. There are cabins and campsites for campers. Facilities are also available for picnicking. Part of Shimek State Forest is adjacent to the park.
