= Keosauqua, Iowa =

- City
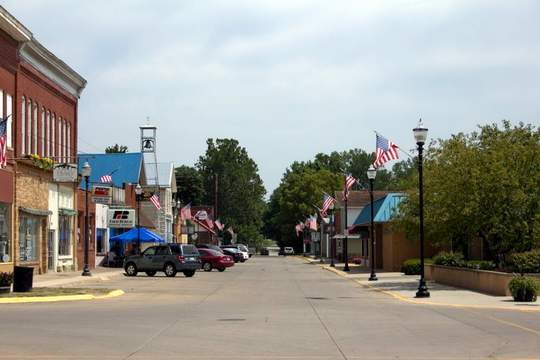
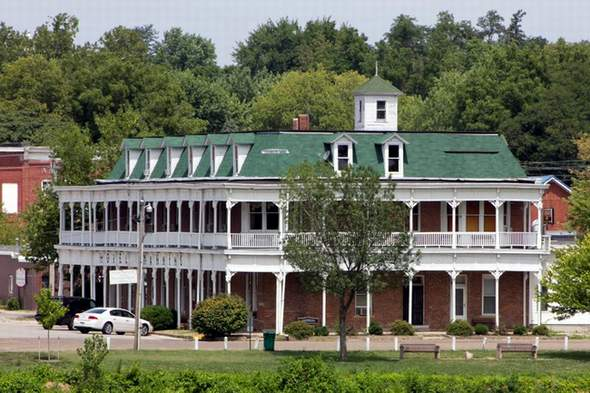
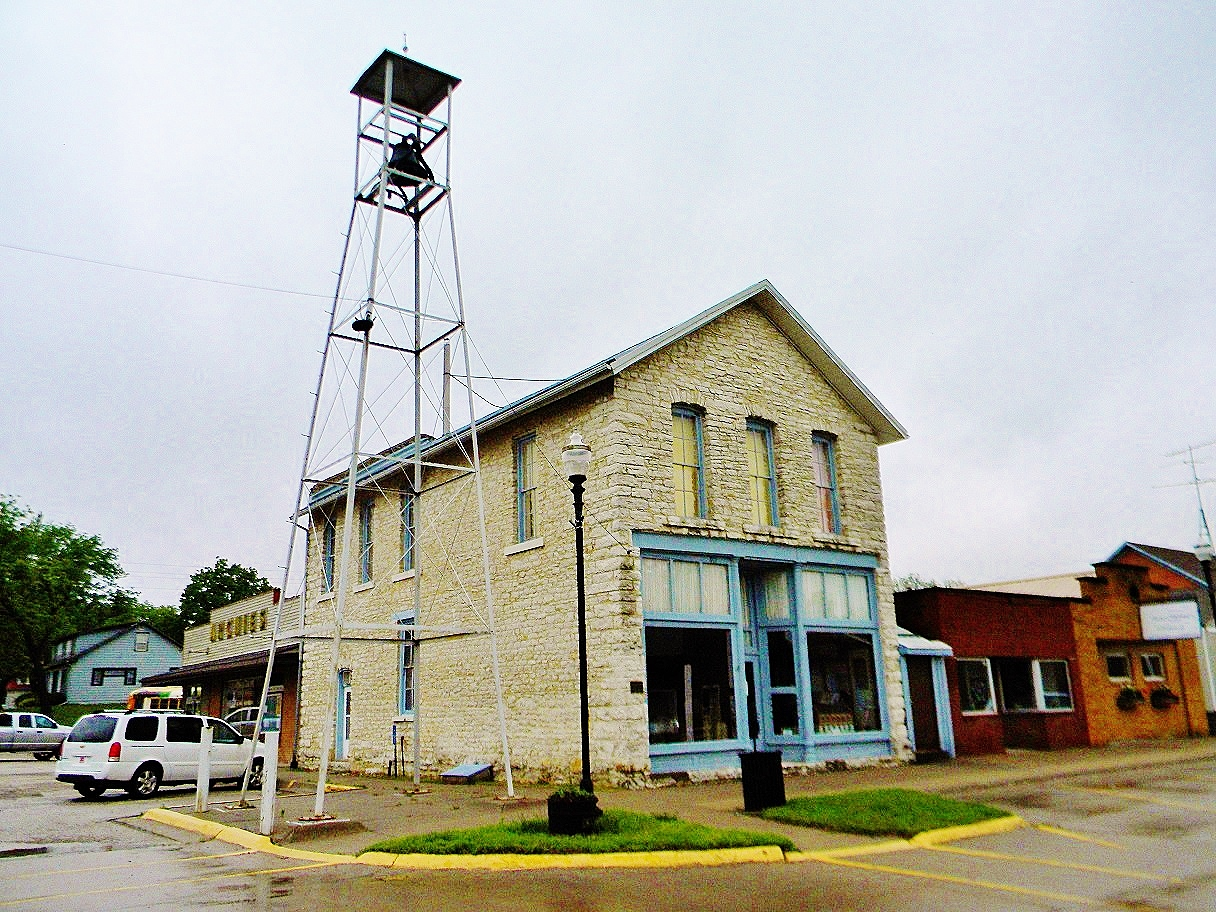
- 1st Street, Downtown Keosauqua Hotel Manning Voltaire Twombley Building

- Location of Keosauqua, Iowa
- Coordinates: 40°44′05″N 91°57′37″W
- Country: United States
- State: Iowa
- County: Van Buren

Area
  - Total: 1.58 sq mi (4.10 km^{2})
  - Land: 1.46 sq mi (3.78 km^{2})
  - Water: 0.12 sq mi (0.32 km^{2})
- Elevation: 633 ft (193 m)

Population (2020)
  - Total: 936
  - Density: 641.6/sq mi (247.74/km^{2})
- Time zone: UTC-6 (Central (CST))
  - Summer (DST): UTC-5 (CDT)
- ZIP code: 52565
- Area code: 319
- FIPS code: 19-40935
- GNIS feature ID: 2395517
- Website: keosauqua.com

Keosauqua (/ˌkiːəˈsɔːkwə/ KEE-ə-SAW-kwə) is a city and the county seat of Van Buren County, Iowa, United States. The population was 936 at the time of the 2020 census. Keosauqua was settled by the Meskwaki and Sauk people until it became US territory in 1832 as part of the Black Hawk Purchase and was "laid out" by European settlers in 1839.

== Geography ==
Keosauqua is in the Southern Iowa Drift Plain, formed by Pre-Illinoian glaciers approximately 300,000 years ago. The topography of the area is heavily forested rolling hills, interspersed with farmland, and has many tributaries flowing into the Des Moines River. The Des Moines was large enough to handle steamboat traffic in the 1800s and was the reason that Keosauqua was founded.

According to the United States Census Bureau, the city has a total area of 1.57 square miles (4.07 km^{2}), of which 1.45 square miles (3.76 km^{2}) is land and 0.12 square miles (0.31 km^{2}) is water.

=== Climate ===
Climate data for Keosauqua, Iowa (1991–2020)
Month	Jan	Feb	Mar	Apr	May	Jun	Jul	Aug	Sep	Oct	Nov	Dec	Year
Mean daily maximum °F (°C)	32.0 (0.0)	36.8 (2.7)	50.1 (10.1)	62.9 (17.2)	72.7 (22.6)	81.8 (27.7)	85.9 (29.9)	84.5 (29.2)	77.5 (25.3)	64.6 (18.1)	49.4 (9.7)	36.9 (2.7)	61.3 (16.3)
Daily mean °F (°C)	22.9 (−5.1)	26.9 (−2.8)	39.3 (4.1)	51.1 (10.6)	61.7 (16.5)	71.1 (21.7)	75.2 (24.0)	73.4 (23.0)	65.3 (18.5)	53.1 (11.7)	39.3 (4.1)	28.3 (−2.1)	50.6 (10.4)
Mean daily minimum °F (°C)	13.8 (−10.1)	17.0 (−8.3)	28.5 (−1.9)	39.3 (4.1)	50.6 (10.3)	60.3 (15.7)	64.5 (18.1)	62.2 (16.8)	53.2 (11.8)	41.7 (5.4)	29.2 (−1.6)	19.6 (−6.9)	40.0 (4.5)
Average precipitation inches (mm)	1.50 (38)	2.11 (54)	2.45 (62)	3.64 (92)	5.67 (144)	5.29 (134)	4.48 (114)	3.60 (91)	3.69 (94)	2.97 (75)	2.35 (60)	1.96 (50)	39.71 (1,008)
Average snowfall inches (cm)	7.3 (19)	5.3 (13)	2.7 (6.9)	0.9 (2.3)	0.0 (0.0)	0.0 (0.0)	0.0 (0.0)	0.0 (0.0)	0.0 (0.0)	0.2 (0.51)	1.1 (2.8)	5.5 (14)	23 (58.51)
Source: NOAA

== History ==
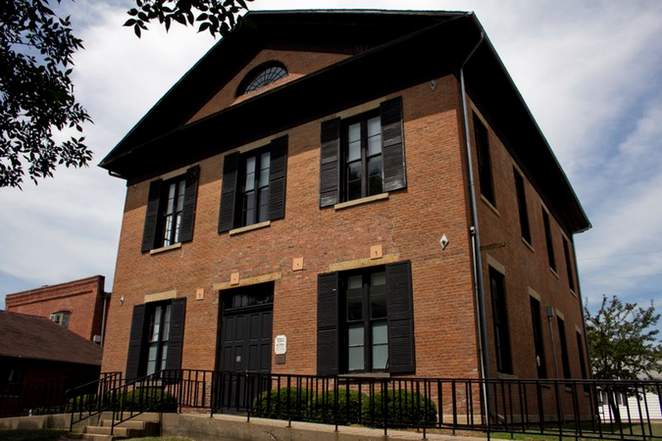
Van Buren County courthouse in Keosauqua. The building, the oldest courthouse in the state, is on the National Register of Historic Places.

The word Keosauqua derives from the Meskwaki and Sauk name for the Des Moines River, "Ke-o-saw-qua", which literally translates as "Bend in the River", which accurately describes its position on the Des Moines.

After the Black Hawk War the United States' gained a large section of present-day Iowa in 1832 known as Black Hawk Purchase, including Keosauqua.

The 1839 Honey War, so named because three trees with beehives were cut down in the process, was fought south of Keosauqua in what is now Lacey-Keosauqua State Park. The event was a border disagreement between Iowa and Missouri. Before it was over, militias from both sides faced each other, though the dispute was ultimately resolved without a shot being fired.

Keosauqua was "laid out" by white settlers in 1839.

In 1840, out of the first four so called "Indian cessions" the Black Hawk Purchase, the Keokuk´s Reserve, the Half-Breed Tract, and the Second Black Hawk Purchase the settlers had laid out 22 Iowa counties.

In 1843, the Van Buren County Courthouse was built in the Greek Revival style. The courthouse was the scene for the murder trial of William McCauley. A guilty verdict led to his subsequent demise at Hangman's Hollow. It was the first legal hanging in Iowa history. the courthouse is the oldest in continuous use in the state, and second-oldest in the United States, on the National Register of Historic Places.

When Brigham Young and his followers were exiled from their base at Nauvoo, Illinois in 1846, their caravan crossed the Des Moines River at Ely's Ford, just upriver from Keosauqua on what is now known as the Mormon Trail.The 1847 Pearson House was a stop on the Underground Railroad.

By 1850 there were several "factories" in town including a pottery plant, a saw mill, plow factory, wagon factory, tanneries, and a packing plant.

Van Buren County native Voltaire Twombly who had received the Congressional Medal of Honor for actions taken at Ft. Donelson during the American Civil War became mayor of Keosauqua in 1884 and, as a businessman there, he built the Twombly Building, a stone building on 1st street that remains to this day.

=== 21st century ===
In November 2025, Republican Iowa U.S. Representative Mariannette Miller-Meeks announced she would hold a town hall meeting during the middle of a workday, Monday in Keosauqua.

== Sights and tourism ==
The Hotel Manning, a three-story relic from the Des Moines River's steamboat days, is Keosauqua's most notable landmark. Its unique Steamboat Gothic architecture mimics riverboats of the mid-1800s. The hotel was placed on the National Register of Historic Places in April 1973. In 2017, community supporters, organized as Engage Keosauqua, purchased the hotel. Over the next couple of years, through contributions and grants, they made repairs and updated improvements to bring the hotel back to its former grandeur. The Hotel Manning today continues to be a centerpiece of southeastern Iowa culture and history.

Lacey-Keosauqua is one of the largest Iowa state parks and was built by the Civil Conservation Corps during the Great Depression. The lake bathhouse and lodge stone work, from stone quarried within the park, remain outstanding testament to their work.

Keosauqua hosts its annual Fall Festival the second full weekend in October.

== Demographics ==
Historical populations
Year	Pop.	±%
1850	705	—
1870	869	+23.3%
1880	883	+1.6%
1890	831	−5.9%
1900	1,117	+34.4%
1910	1,009	−9.7%
1920	851	−15.7%
1930	855	+0.5%
1940	1,040	+21.6%
1950	1,101	+5.9%
1960	1,023	−7.1%
1970	1,018	−0.5%
1980	1,003	−1.5%
1990	1,020	+1.7%
2000	1,066	+4.5%
2010	1,006	−5.6%
2020	936	−7.0%
Source:"U.S. Census website". United States Census Bureau. and Iowa Data Center; Source: U.S. Decennial Census

=== 2020 census ===
As of the census of 2020, there were 936 people, 429 households, and 236 families residing in the city. The population density was 641.6 inhabitants per square mile (247.7/km^{2}). There were 483 housing units at an average density of 331.1 per square mile (127.8/km^{2}). The racial makeup of the city was 95.3% White, 0.2% Black or African American, 0.1% Native American, 0.9% Asian, 0.0% Pacific Islander, 0.6% from other races and 2.9% from two or more races. Hispanic or Latino persons of any race comprised 2.2% of the population.

Of the 429 households, 19.6% of which had children under the age of 18 living with them, 42.2% were married couples living together, 7.2% were cohabitating couples, 31.0% had a female householder with no spouse or partner present and 19.6% had a male householder with no spouse or partner present. 45.0% of all households were non-families. 38.7% of all households were made up of individuals, 24.2% had someone living alone who was 65 years old or older.

The median age in the city was 54.3 years. 19.6% of the residents were under the age of 20; 2.0% were between the ages of 20 and 24; 18.2% were from 25 and 44; 26.1% were from 45 and 64; and 34.2% were 65 years of age or older. The gender makeup of the city was 46.9% male and 53.1% female.

=== 2010 census ===
As of the census of 2010, there were 1,006 people, 459 households, and 251 families residing in the city. The population density was 693.8 inhabitants per square mile (267.9/km^{2}). There were 515 housing units at an average density of 355.2 per square mile (137.1/km^{2}). The racial makeup of the city was 97.6% White, 0.4% African American, 0.9% Asian, 0.1% from other races, and 1.0% from two or more races. Hispanic or Latino of any race were 1.1% of the population.

There were 459 households, of which 20.7% had children under the age of 18 living with them, 43.1% were married couples living together, 7.4% had a female householder with no husband present, 4.1% had a male householder with no wife present, and 45.3% were non-families. 41.6% of all households were made up of individuals, and 23.3% had someone living alone who was 65 years of age or older. The average household size was 2.06 and the average family size was 2.79.

The median age in the city was 50.9 years. 17.5% of residents were under the age of 18; 7.2% were between the ages of 18 and 24; 18.5% were from 25 to 44; 28.3% were from 45 to 64; and 28.8% were 65 years of age or older. The gender makeup of the city was 46.9% male and 53.1% female.

=== 2000 census ===
As of the census of 2000, there were 1,066 people, 467 households, and 270 families residing in the city. The population density was 728.7 inhabitants per square mile (281.4/km^{2}). There were 505 housing units at an average density of 345.2 per square mile (133.3/km^{2}). The racial makeup of the city was 98.59% White, 0.19% African American, 0.28% Asian, and 0.94% from two or more races. Hispanic or Latino of any race were 0.09% of the population.

There were 467 households, out of which 24.6% had children under the age of 18 living with them, 44.5% were married couples living together, 10.5% had a female householder with no husband present, and 42.0% were non-families. 38.5% of all households were made up of individuals, and 24.8% had someone living alone who was 65 years of age or older. The average household size was 2.10 and the average family size was 2.77.

Age spread: 19.9% under the age of 18, 6.1% from 18 to 24, 19.5% from 25 to 44, 23.1% from 45 to 64, and 31.4% who were 65 years of age or older. The median age was 49 years. For every 100 females, there were 77.4 males. For every 100 females age 18 and over, there were 73.9 males.

The median income for a household in the city was $27,833, and the median income for a family was $37,063. Males had a median income of $25,489 versus $19,904 for females. The per capita income for the city was $16,097. About 7.7% of families and 12.1% of the population were below the poverty line, including 14.5% of those under age 18 and 12.7% of those age 65 or over.

== Education ==
The community is served by the Van Buren County Community School District. It was previously in the Van Buren Community School District, until it merged into Van Buren County CSD on July 1, 2019.

Keosauqua is home to the Van Buren Warriors at Van Buren High School; Harmony High School consolidated into it at the end of the 2015–2016 school year as part of a grade-sharing arrangement. In 2018 the Van Buren district voted to merge with the Harmony Community School District.

== Government ==
Keosauqua is the location of Iowa's oldest courthouse in continuous use; it was built in 1840. The adjacent Hangman's Hollow is the site of the first legal hanging in the state of Iowa.

== Notable people ==
- Josiah H. Bonney (1817–1887), Iowa Secretary of State and territorial legislator.
- Smith W. Brookhart (1869–1944) US Senator from Iowa
- Henry Clay Caldwell (1832–1915) United States federal judge and Union Army officer.
- Caroline Matilda Dodson (1845–1898), physician
- Sallie Fox (1845–1913), California pioneer who spent her childhood in Keosauqua
- James B. Howell (1816–1880), newspaper editor and U.S. Senator
- Leonard John Rose (1827–1899), California pioneer and leader of the Rose–Baley Party
- Theodosia Burr Shepherd (1845–1906), botanist
- Phil Stong (1899–1957), an American author, journalist and Hollywood scenarist.
- Voltaire P. Twombly, (1842–1918), politician and Medal of Honor recipient
- Edward K. Valentine (1843–1916) US Representative from Nebraska
- George G. Wright (1820–1896) US Senator from Iowa

== Gallery ==
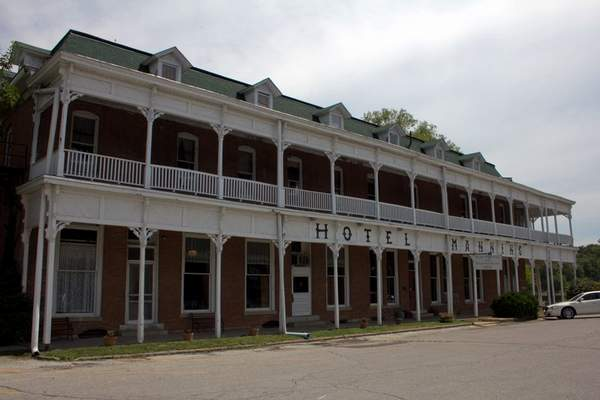
Closeup of Hotel Manning, showing the "steamboat style" design.

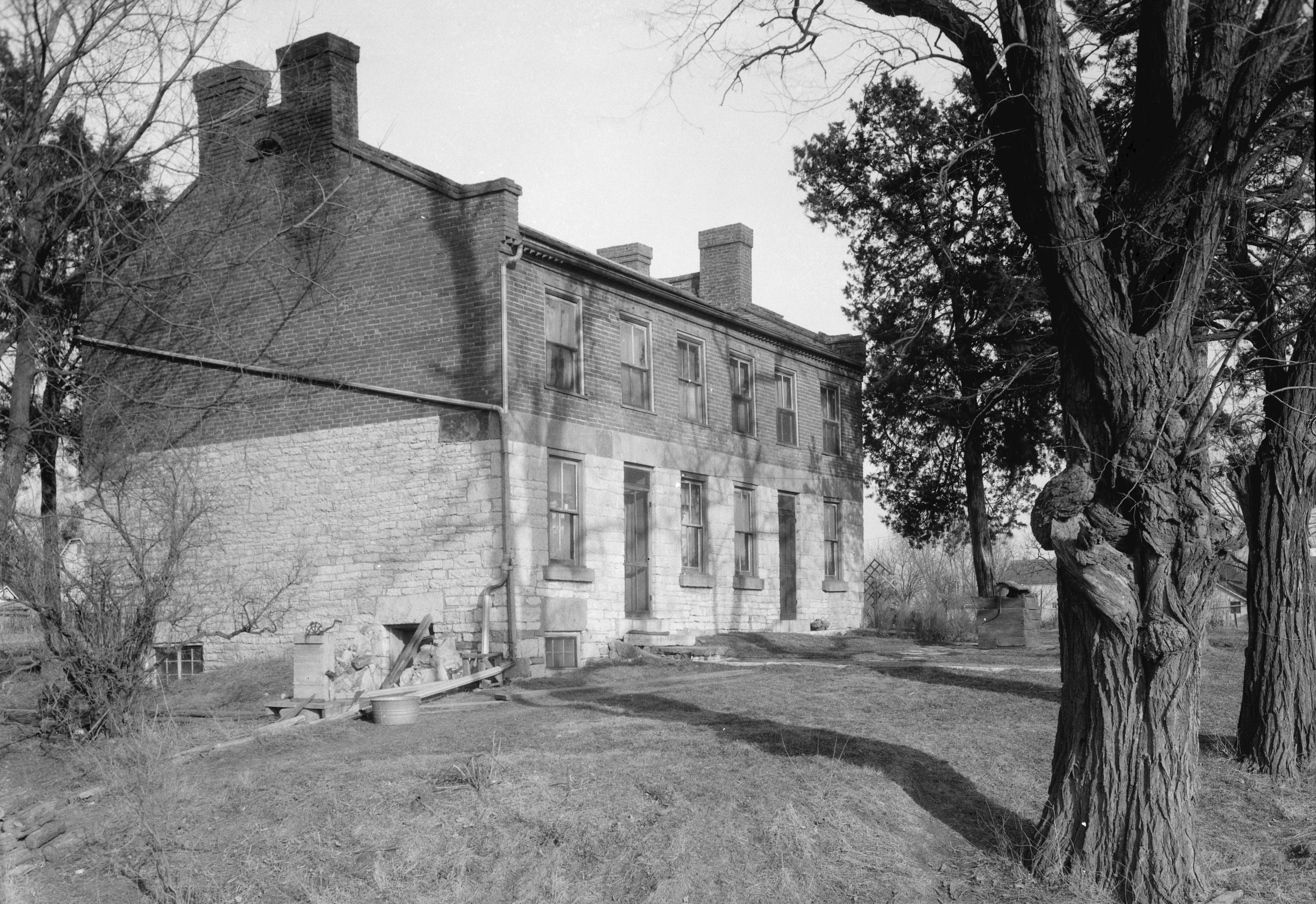
Franklin Pearson House, listed on the National Register of Historic Places

== See also ==
- Bentonsport is a 35-acre historical district that was listed on the National Register of Historic Places in 1972.
- Lake Sugema is a constructed artificial 574 acres (2.32 km^{2}) lake.
- The Great Flood of 1851
- USS Keosauqua was a proposed and partially built United States Navy ship during the Civil War.
- Des Moines Rapids limited Steamboat traffic through the early 19th century.
- Sullivan Line is the history of the border between Missouri and Iowa.
- Shimek State Forest
