= Croton, Iowa =

- Unincorporated community
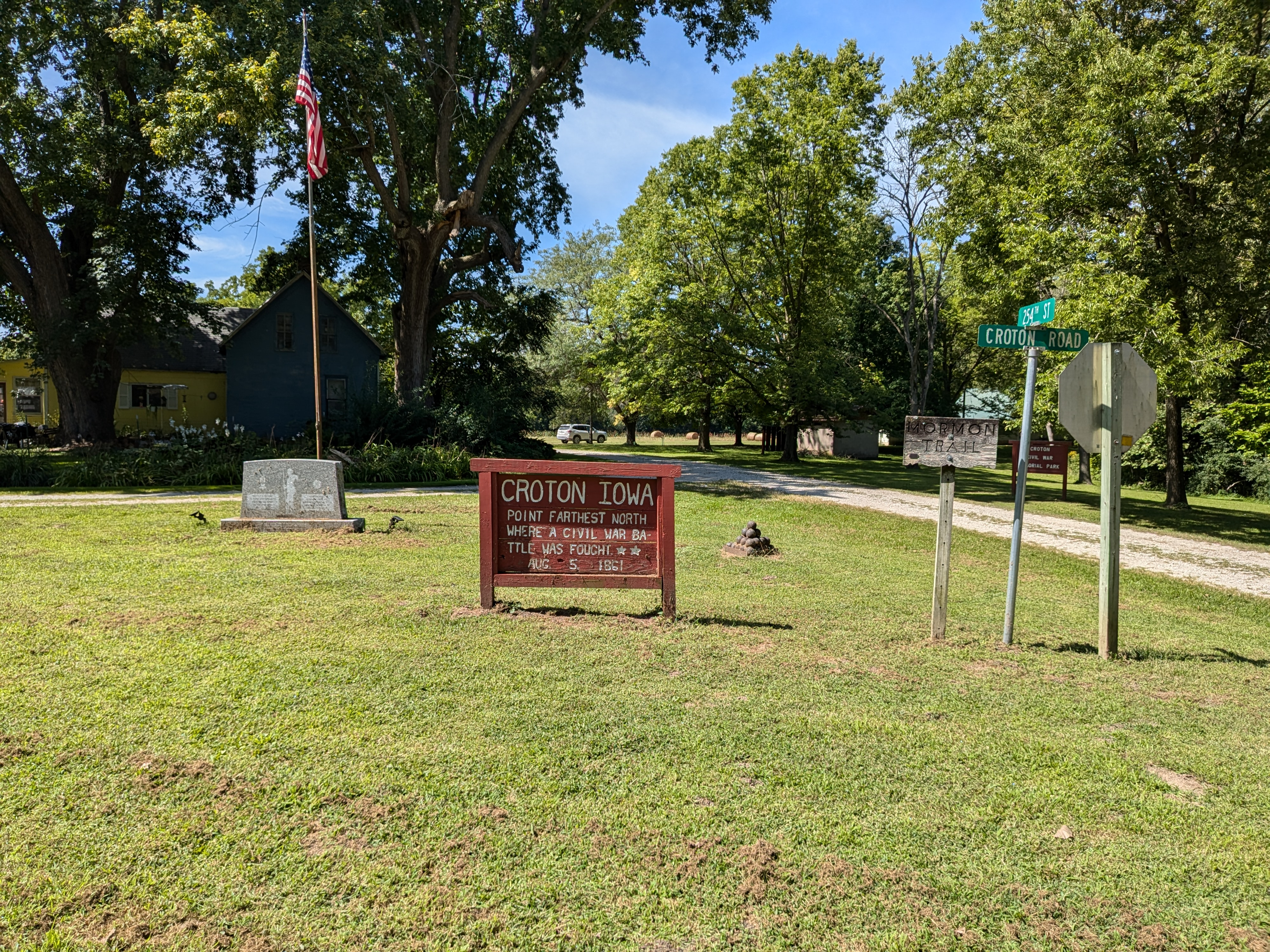
- The entrance to the Civil War Memorial Park in Croton

- Location in Iowa Location in the United States
- Coordinates: 40°35′25″N 91°41′27″W
- Country: United States
- State: Iowa
- County: Lee
- Elevation: 548 ft (167 m)
- Time zone: UTC-6 (Central (CST))
  - Summer (DST): UTC-5 (CDT)
- Area code: 319
- GNIS feature ID: 455735

Croton is an unincorporated community in southwestern Lee County, Iowa, United States. The Des Moines River flows past the southwest side of the community along the Iowa-Missouri border.

== History ==
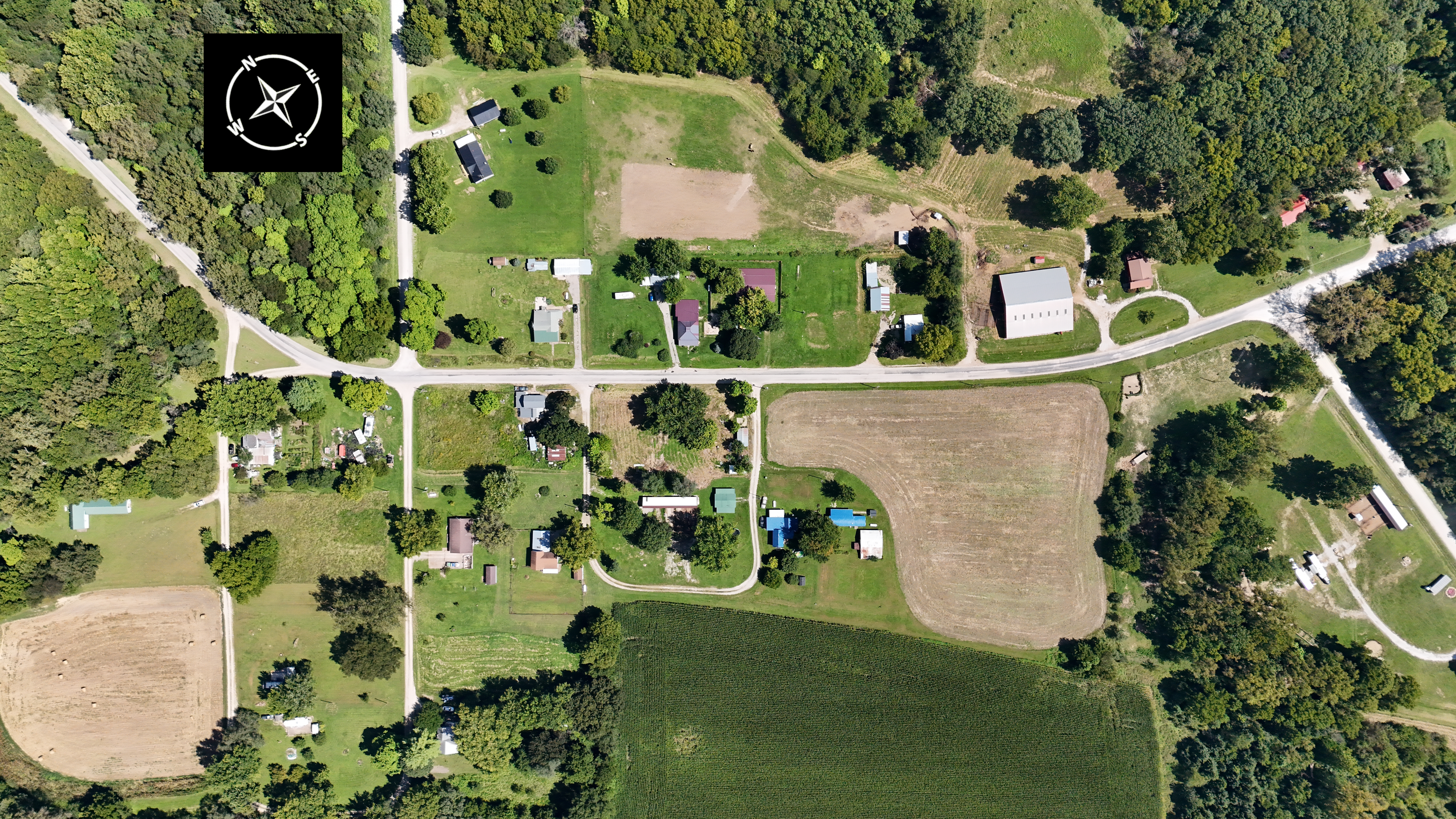
An aerial view of Croton, taken on 22 August 2024

On August 5, 1861, the Battle of Athens raged on the other side of the Des Moines River from Croton. During the fighting several shots from artillery flew over the river into the community.

== Demographics ==
Croton's population was 96 in 1902, 110 in 1925, and 110 in 1940.
