= Voltaire Twombley Building =

- U.S. National Register of Historic Places
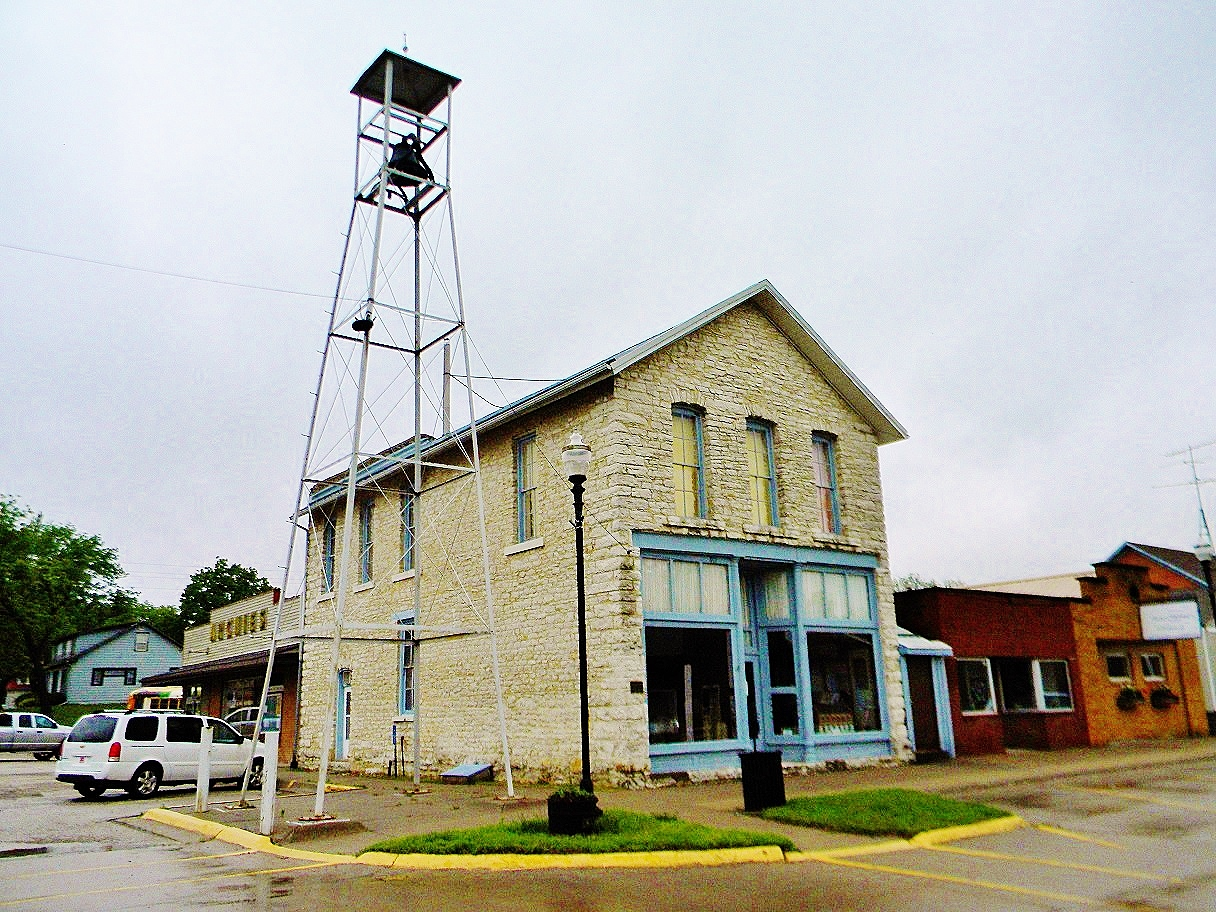

- Location within Iowa Location within the United States
- Location: 803 1st St. Keosauqua, Iowa
- Coordinates: 40°43′51″N 91°57′41″W
- Area: less than one acre
- Built: 1875
- Architectural style: Vernacular
- NRHP reference No.: 93000655
- Added to NRHP: July 29, 1993

The Voltaire Twombley Building is a historic building located in Keosauqua, Iowa, United States. The two-story structure is a good example of 19th-century vernacular commercial design constructed in limestone. it is the largest example of stone construction that remains in Van Buren County. While it was built in the 1870s, it is more reminiscent of similar buildings constructed in the 1840s and 1850s. The only thing that differentiates these rectangular, front gable structures from a house or a school is the first floor storefront. Keosauqua had several stone commercial buildings at one time, but now they are all brick but this one. The building is associated with Voltaire P. Twombly, who was awarded the Medal of Honor for bravery at the Battle of Fort Donelson during the American Civil War. He operated a dry goods and grocery business in this building beginning in 1876. It was listed on the National Register of Historic Places in 1993.
