= Eisenhower Bridge (Milton, Iowa) =

- U.S. National Register of Historic Places
- Location within Iowa Location within the United States
- Location: 3 miles east of County Road V56
- Nearest city: Milton, Iowa
- Coordinates: 40°40′43″N 92°07′02″W
- Area: less than one acre
- Built: 1888
- Built by: James B. Diver Bridge Company
- Architect: Horace B. Horton
- Architectural style: Pratt truss
- MPS: Highway Bridges of Iowa MPS
- NRHP reference No.: 98000478
- Added to NRHP: May 15, 1998

The Eisenhower Bridge is located east of Milton, Iowa, United States. It carries traffic on 252nd Street over the Fox River for 197 feet (60 m). The supervisors from Des Moines and Lee counties met on September 7, 1887, to view the location of a new bridge between the two counties over the Skunk River on the Burlington-Fort Madison Road. Financing delayed building the new bridge. They determined that Des Moines County would pay three-fifths of the costs and Lee County the remainder. Chicago engineer Horace B. Horton designed the Pratt truss, and it was built by the James B. Diver Bridge Company of Keokuk, Iowa. The Walker's Ferry Bridge was originally a two-span structure, and it was completed for $9,435. It was replaced with another bridge in 1930, and one of the spans was relocated to this location. Known locally as the Eisenhower Bridge, it replaced an 1895 span that was washed out in a flood. While it lost some of its historical integrity, it remains an example of early wagon bridge construction. It is also one of the few iron truss bridges remaining in Iowa, and it was designed by a prominent bridge engineer. The bridge was listed on the National Register of Historic Places in 1998.
