= Vernon School (Vernon, Iowa) =

- U.S. National Register of Historic Places
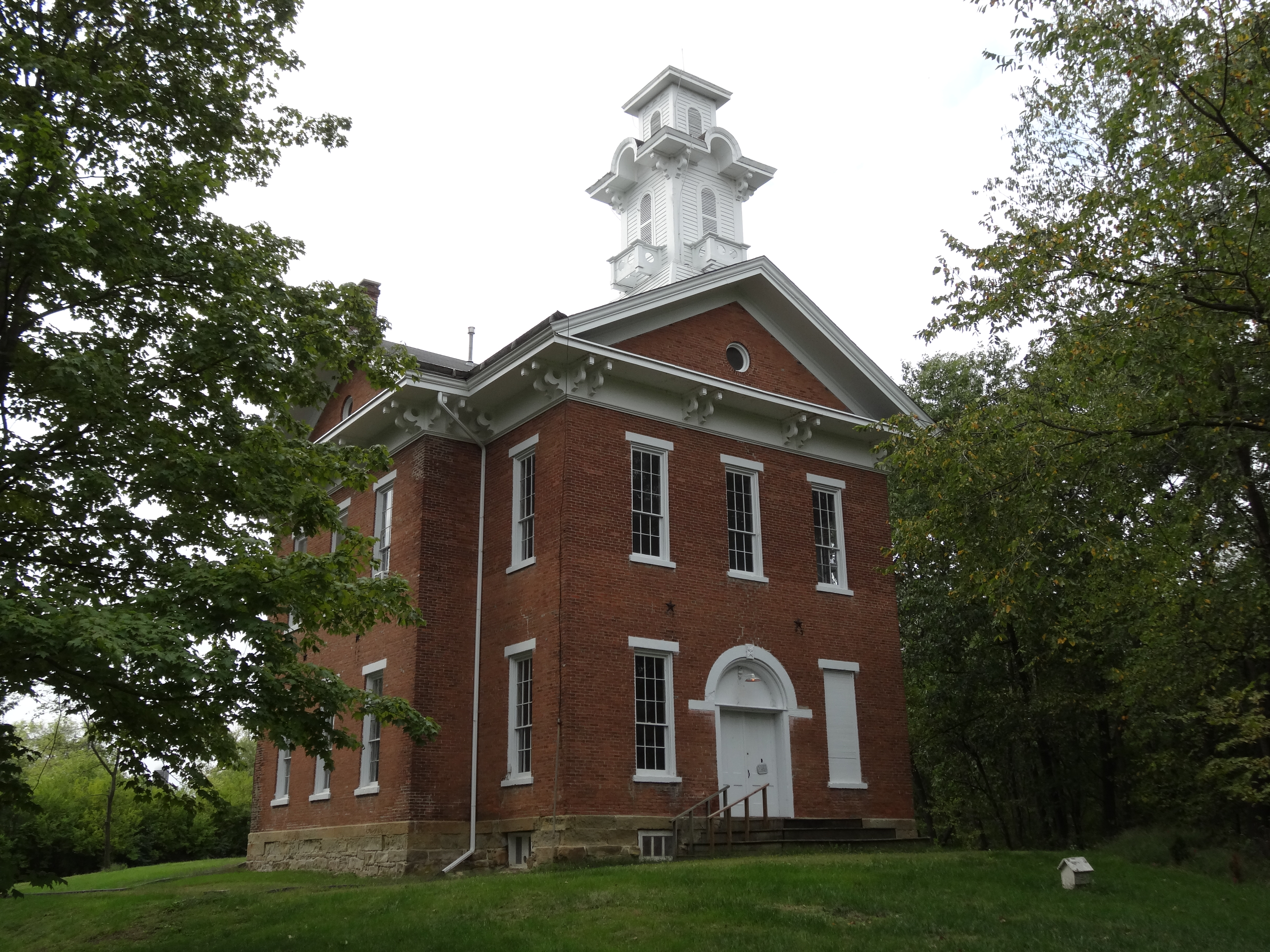

- Location within Iowa Location within the United States
- Location: 26849 South St. Vernon, Iowa
- Coordinates: 40°43′17″N 91°51′23″W
- Area: less than one acre
- Architect: Riley Cass
- Architectural style: Italianate
- NRHP reference No.: 02001024
- Added to NRHP: September 12, 2002

Vernon School is a historic building located in the unincorporated community of Vernon, Iowa, United States. Vernon was established as South Bentonsport in 1837. It received its present name with the establishment of a post office in 1852. Citizens began the process of establishing a public school in May 1866. They acquired the land in January of the following year. Riley Cass, who was probably a local builder, provided the plans for the building and was chosen to oversee its construction. The design itself was more than likely from a pattern book. Construction proceeded slowly as funds became available. Although it was substantially completed earlier, as late as 1873 the school board was still hiring workers to do finishing work. The two-story, brick Italianate building features a low pitch roof, bracketed eaves, a square bell tower, and a fanlight over the main entrance. School district consolidation began in Van Buren County in 1957 and culminated two years later with the creation of three districts. The Vernon School held its last classes in 1960. The building, which had always been used as a community center was a polling place until 1984. It is the only 19th-century brick public school building left in the county. The former school building was listed on the National Register of Historic Places in 2002.
