= Farmington, Iowa =

- City
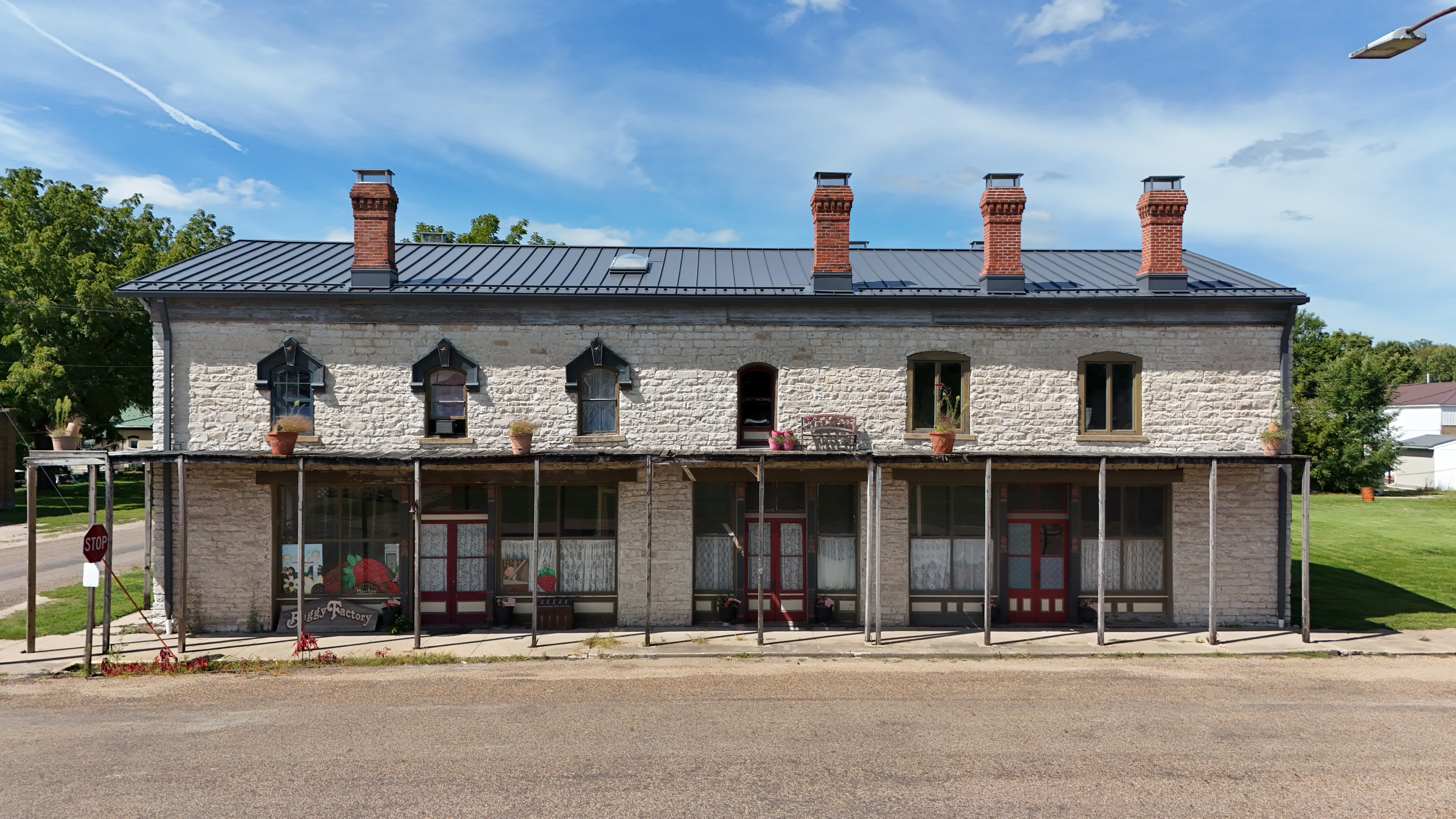
- An old buggy factory in Farmington
- Nickname: Farmtown
- Motto: "Oldest Village in Van Buren County"
- Interactive location map of Farmington
- Coordinates: 40.638812°N 91.738964°W
- Country: United States
- State: Iowa
- County: Van Buren
- Founded: 1839
- Incorporated: January 11, 1841

Government
  - Mayor: Janet Browning

Area
  - Total: 0.463 sq mi (1.198 km^{2})
  - Land: 0.463 sq mi (1.198 km^{2})
  - Water: 0 sq mi (0.000 km^{2}) 0.0%
- Elevation: 564 ft (172 m)

Population (2020)
  - Total: 579
  - Estimate (2024): 583
  - Density: 1,250/sq mi (483/km^{2})
- Time zone: UTC–6 (Central (CST))
  - Summer (DST): UTC–5 (CDT)
- ZIP Code: 52626
- Area code: 319
- FIPS code: 19-26895
- GNIS feature ID: 2394748
- Website: farmingtoniowa.com

Farmington is a city in Van Buren County, Iowa, United States. The population was 579 at the 2020 census, and was estimated at 583 in 2024.

== History ==
Farmington was founded in 1839. It was named after Farmington, Connecticut. The town was incorporated on January 11, 1841.

Farmington has suffered from several major floods of the Des Moines River, most notably in 1993, when a "500-year-flood" caused major damage to the buildings near the river, including a one-block area bordered by Walnut, Second, and Third Streets. The houses in this block were subsequently razed, and the property was purchased by the City of Farmington to create "Wild Rose City Park."

== Geography ==
Farmington is located on the left (east) bank of the Des Moines River.

According to the United States Census Bureau, the city has a total area of 0.462 square miles (1.20 km^{2}), all land.

== Demographics ==
Historical population
| Census | Pop. | Note | %± |
|---|---|---|---|
| 1850 | 585 | | — |
| 1860 | 601 | | 2.7% |
| 1870 | 640 | | 6.5% |
| 1880 | 781 | | 22.0% |
| 1890 | 1,002 | | 28.3% |
| 1900 | 1,332 | | 32.9% |
| 1910 | 1,165 | | −12.5% |
| 1920 | 1,086 | | −6.8% |
| 1930 | 1,012 | | −6.8% |
| 1940 | 968 | | −4.3% |
| 1950 | 899 | | −7.1% |
| 1960 | 902 | | 0.3% |
| 1970 | 800 | | −11.3% |
| 1980 | 869 | | 8.6% |
| 1990 | 655 | | −24.6% |
| 2000 | 756 | | 15.4% |
| 2010 | 664 | | −12.2% |
| 2020 | 579 | | −12.8% |
| 2024 (est.) | 583 | | 0.7% |
U.S. Decennial Census; 2020 Census

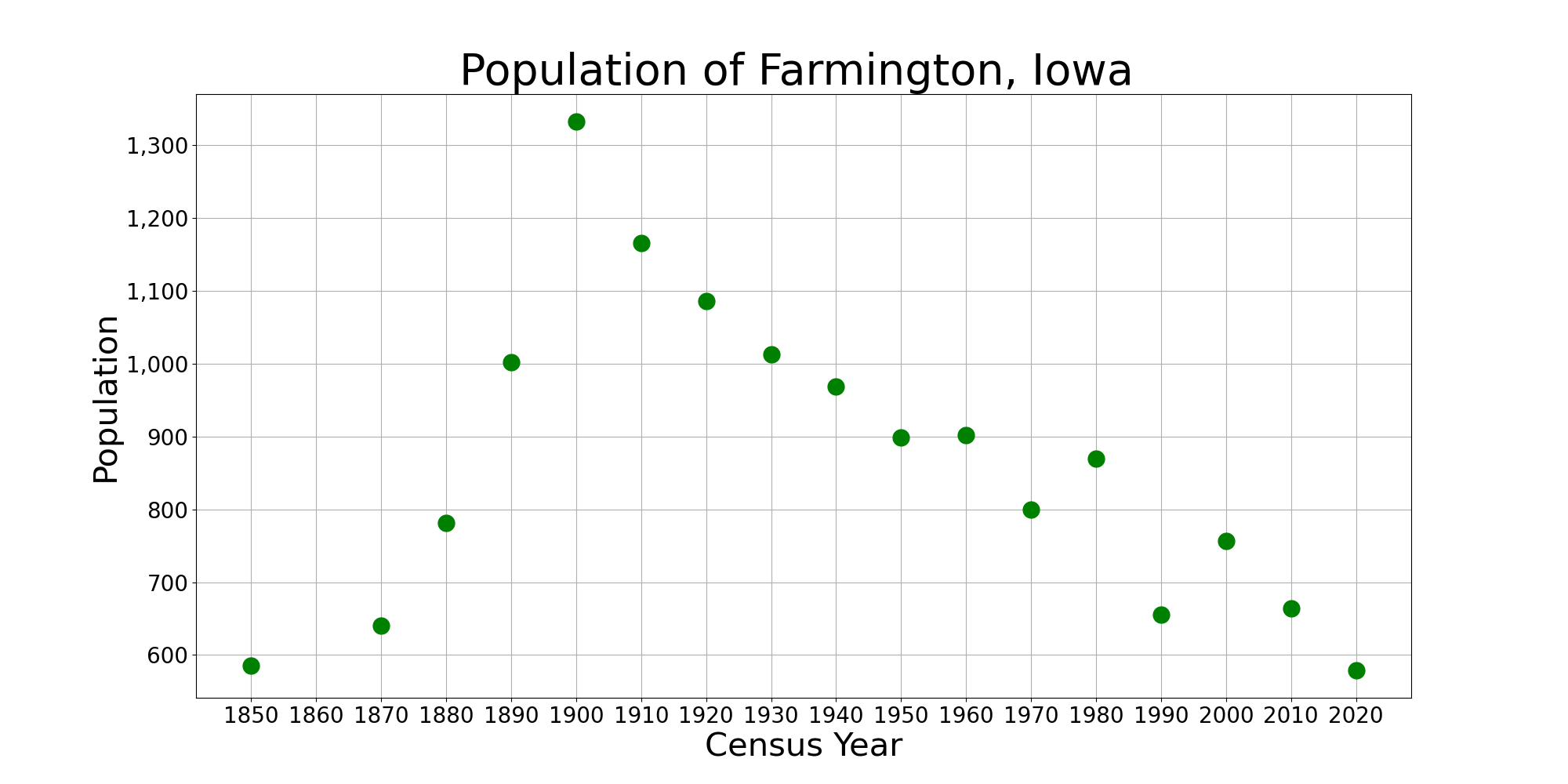
The population of Farmington, Iowa from the U.S. census data

=== 2020 census ===
As of the 2020 census, there were 579 people, 259 households, and 149 families residing in the city. The population density was 1,253.25 inhabitants per square mile (483.9/km^{2}). There were 305 housing units at an average density of 660.17 per square mile (254.9/km^{2}). The racial makeup of the city was 93.09% White, 0.35% African American, 0.00% Native American, 0.00% Asian, 0.00% Pacific Islander, 1.04% from some other races and 5.53% from two or more races. Hispanic or Latino people of any race were 2.25% of the population.

There were 259 households, 25.9% of which had children under the age of 18 living with them, 41.7% were married couples living together, 7.3% were cohabitating couples, 24.7% had a female householder with no spouse or partner present and 26.3% had a male householder with no spouse or partner present. 42.5% of all households were non-families. 36.7% of all households were made up of individuals, 20.1% had someone living alone who was 65 years old or older.

The median age in the city was 45.6 years. 24.5% of the residents were under the age of 20; 3.5% were between the ages of 20 and 24; 21.4% were from 25 and 44; 27.3% were from 45 and 64; and 23.3% were 65 years of age or older. The gender makeup of the city was 52.8% male and 47.2% female.

=== 2010 census ===
As of the 2010 census, there were 664 people, 299 households, and 170 families residing in the city. The population density was 1,412.8 inhabitants per square mile (545.5/km^{2}). There were 337 housing units at an average density of 717.0 per square mile (276.8/km^{2}). The racial makeup of the city was 97.74% White, 0.30% African American, 0.75% Native American, 0.00% Asian, 0.00% Pacific Islander, 0.60% from some other races and 0.60% from two or more races. Hispanic or Latino people of any race were 2.11% of the population.

There were 299 households, of which 28.1% had children under the age of 18 living with them, 42.1% were married couples living together, 9.7% had a female householder with no husband present, 5.0% had a male householder with no wife present, and 43.1% were non-families. 39.5% of all households were made up of individuals, and 22.8% had someone living alone who was 65 years of age or older. The average household size was 2.22 and the average family size was 2.95.

The median age in the city was 41.6 years. 24.4% of residents were under the age of 18; 6.8% were between the ages of 18 and 24; 21.4% were from 25 to 44; 25.6% were from 45 to 64; and 21.8% were 65 years of age or older. The gender makeup of the city was 49.2% male and 50.8% female.

=== 2000 census ===
As of the 2000 census, there were 756 people, 330 households, and 192 families residing in the city. The population density was 1,602.4 inhabitants per square mile (618.7/km^{2}). There were 356 housing units at an average density of 754.6 per square mile (291.4/km^{2}). The racial makeup of the city was 98.94% White, 0.13% African American, 0.00% Native American, 0.00% Asian, 0.00% Pacific Islander, 0.00% from some other races and 0.93% from two or more races. Hispanic or Latino people of any race were 0.26% of the population.

There were 330 households, out of which 26.4% had children under the age of 18 living with them, 48.5% were married couples living together, 5.2% had a female householder with no husband present, and 41.8% were non-families. 38.8% of all households were made up of individuals, and 24.5% had someone living alone who was 65 years of age or older. The average household size was 2.29 and the average family size was 3.00.

In the city, the population was spread out, with 25.7% under the age of 18, 6.3% from 18 to 24, 24.9% from 25 to 44, 21.3% from 45 to 64, and 21.8% who were 65 years of age or older. The median age was 40 years. For every 100 females, there were 90.4 males. For every 100 females age 18 and over, there were 93.8 males.

The median income for a household in the city was $26,354, and the median income for a family was $35,156. Males had a median income of $30,250 versus $21,406 for females. The per capita income for the city was $13,591. About 10.1% of families and 12.8% of the population were below the poverty line, including 14.2% of those under age 18 and 9.0% of those age 65 or over.

== Education ==
The community is served by the Van Buren County Community School District. It was previously in the Harmony Community School District, until it merged into Van Buren County CSD on July 1, 2019.

== Notable person ==
- Voltaire P. Twombly, (1842-1918), Iowan politician, businessman and Medal of Honor recipient for the American Civil War, was born in Farmington.

== Annual events ==
The Farmington Strawberry Festival is always held annually on the second full weekend in June, and is sponsored by the Farmington Arts Council.
