= Des Moines River =

River in Iowa, Minnesota, and Missouri U.S.

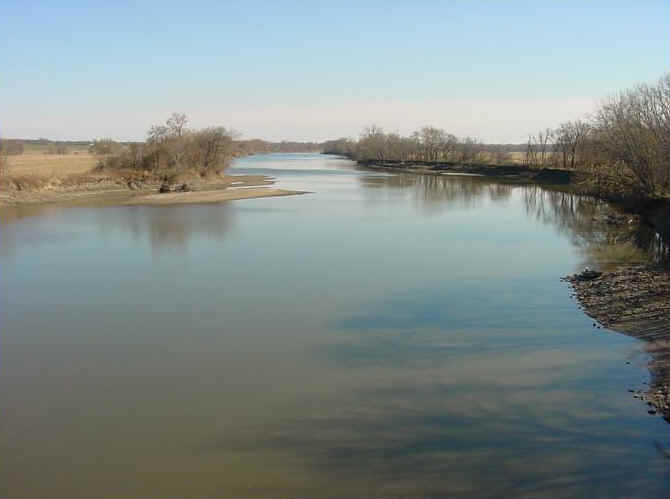
- The Des Moines River upstream of Ottumwa, Iowa

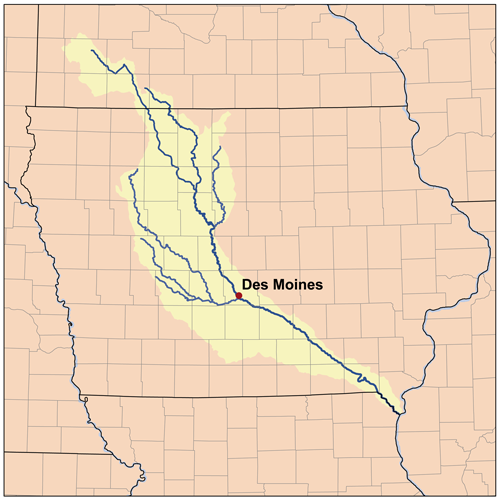
- The Des Moines River watershed

Location
- Country: United States
- State: Iowa, Minnesota, Missouri

Physical characteristics
- Source: Lake Shetek
  - location: Murray County, Minnesota
  - coordinates: 44.0839°N 95.6881°W
  - elevation: 1,483 ft (452 m)
- Mouth: Mississippi River
  - location: Clark County, Missouri / Lee County, Iowa, near Keokuk, Iowa
  - coordinates: 40°22′52″N 91°25′21″W
  - elevation: 597 ft (182 m)
- Length: 525 mi (845 km)
- Basin size: 14,802 sq mi (38,340 km^{2})
- Discharge
  - location: St. Francisville, MO
  - average: 13,223 cu/ft. per sec.

The Des Moines River (/dəˈmɔɪn/) is a tributary of the Mississippi River in the upper Midwestern United States that is approximately 525 miles (845 km) long from its farther headwaters. The largest river flowing across the state of Iowa, it rises in southern Minnesota and flows across Iowa from northwest to southeast, passing from the glaciated plains into the unglaciated hills, transitioning near the capital city of Des Moines in the center of the state. The river continues to flow in a southeastern direction away from Des Moines, flowing directly into the Mississippi River. The Des Moines River forms a short portion of Iowa's border with Missouri between Lee County, Iowa and Clark County, Missouri.

The city of Des Moines, Iowa, was named for the river.

== Hydrography ==
In Minnesota, the upper forks of the Des Moines River drain the plateau and moraines between the Coteau des Prairies to the west, which is drained by the Big Sioux River, and the lower lands to the east which drain northward into the Blue Earth and Minnesota Rivers.

The Des Moines River rises in two forks. The West Fork (the main branch) rises out of the wetlands surrounding Lake Yankton and Long Lake in Lyon County in southwestern Minnesota. The small stream flows southwest into Lake Shetek, then through Windom and Jackson, Minnesota, and near Estherville, Iowa. The East Fork rises out in rural Martin County, Minnesota, just north of Interstate 90. It then flows through Okamanpeedan Lake on the Iowa-Minnesota border, then south, through Algona. The two forks join in southern Humboldt County, approximately 5 miles (8 km) south of Humboldt at Frank Gotch State Park.

The combined stream flows roughly southward through Fort Dodge. South of Boone it passes through the Ledges State Park. It flows through downtown Des Moines, then turns generally southeastward, flowing through Ottumwa. It forms approximately 20 miles (32 km) of the border between Iowa and Missouri before joining the Mississippi from the northwest at Keokuk.

It receives the Boone River from the northeast approximately 20 miles (32 km) southwest of Fort Dodge. It receives the Raccoon River from the west in the city of Des Moines. Above the city of Des Moines, it is impounded to create the Saylorville Lake reservoir. About midway below Saylorville and above Ottumwa, near Pella, the river is impounded to create the Lake Red Rock reservoir.

== History ==
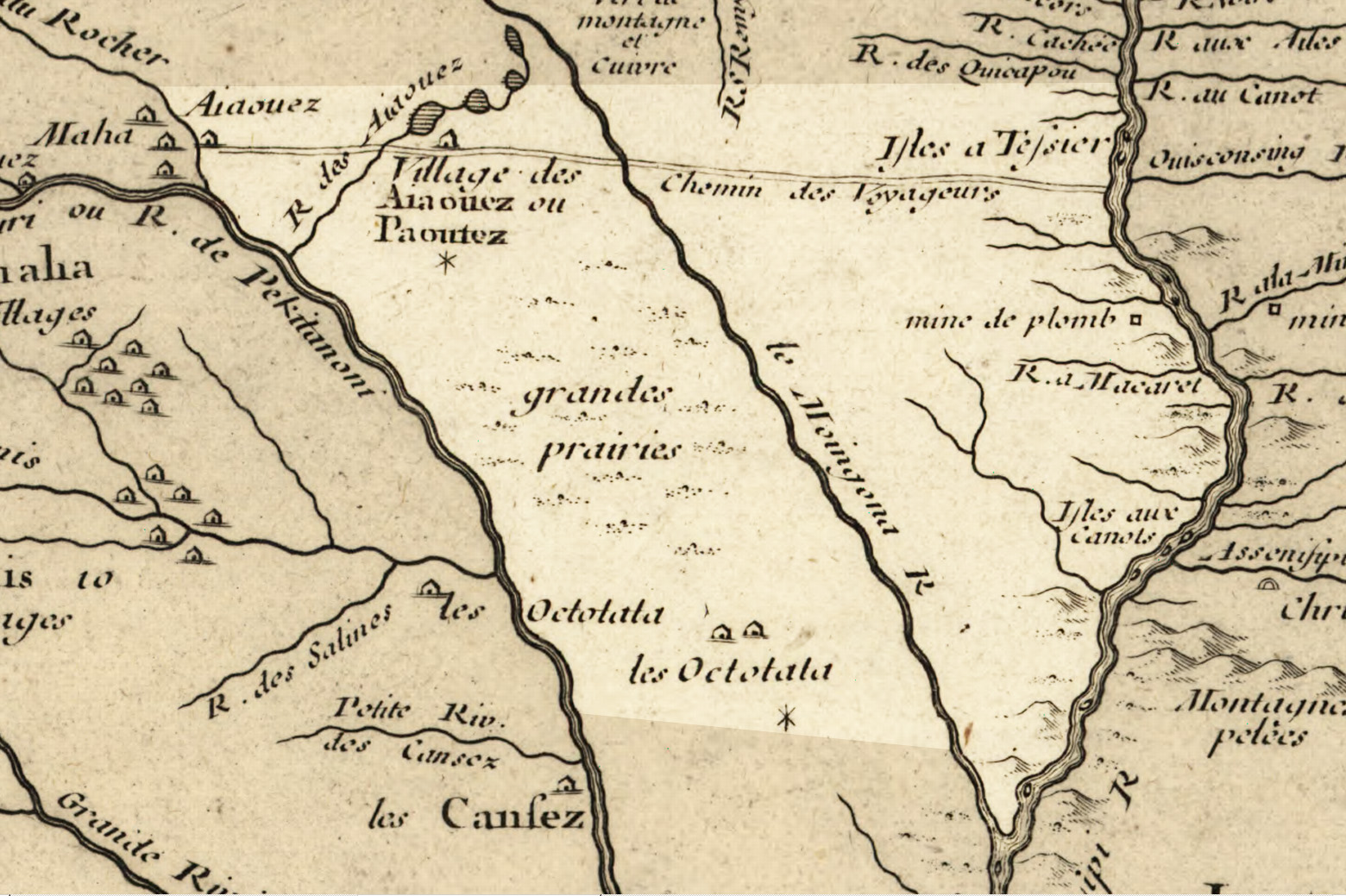
The Des Moines as it was depicted in 1718 by Guillaume Delisle; modern Iowa highlighted.

One of the earliest French maps that depicts the Des Moines (1703) refers to it as "R. des Otentas", which translates to "River of the Otoe"; the Otoe Tribe lived in the interior of Iowa in the 18th century. The Meskwaki and Sauk people referred to the river as "Ke-o-shaw-qua" (Hermit's River), from which Keosauqua, Iowa, derives its name. The Dakota Indians, who lived near its headwaters in present-day Minnesota, referred to it as "Inyan Shasha" in their Siouan language. Another Siouan name was "Eah-sha-wa-pa-ta," or "Red Stone" river, possibly referring to the bluffs at Red Rock or the reddish Sioux Quartzite bedrock near its headwaters.

The origin of the name Des Moines is obscure. Early French explorers named it La Rivière des Moines, literally meaning "River of the Monks". The name may have referred to early Trappist monks who built huts near the mouth of the river at the Mississippi.

William Bright writes that Moines was an abbreviation used by the French for Moingouena or Moingona, an Algonquian subgroup of the Illinois people. The Native American term was /mooyiinkweena/, a derogatory name applied to the Moingouena by the Peoria people, a closely related subgroup. The meaning of the native word, according to an early French writer, is visage plein d'ordure, or in plain English, "shit-face", from mooy-, "shit", -iinkwee, "face", and -na, "indefinite actor".

The 1718 Guillaume Delisle map (pictured) labels it as "le Moingona R."

During the mid-19th century, the river supported the main commercial transportation by water across Iowa. River traffic began to be superseded by the railroads constructed from the 1860s.

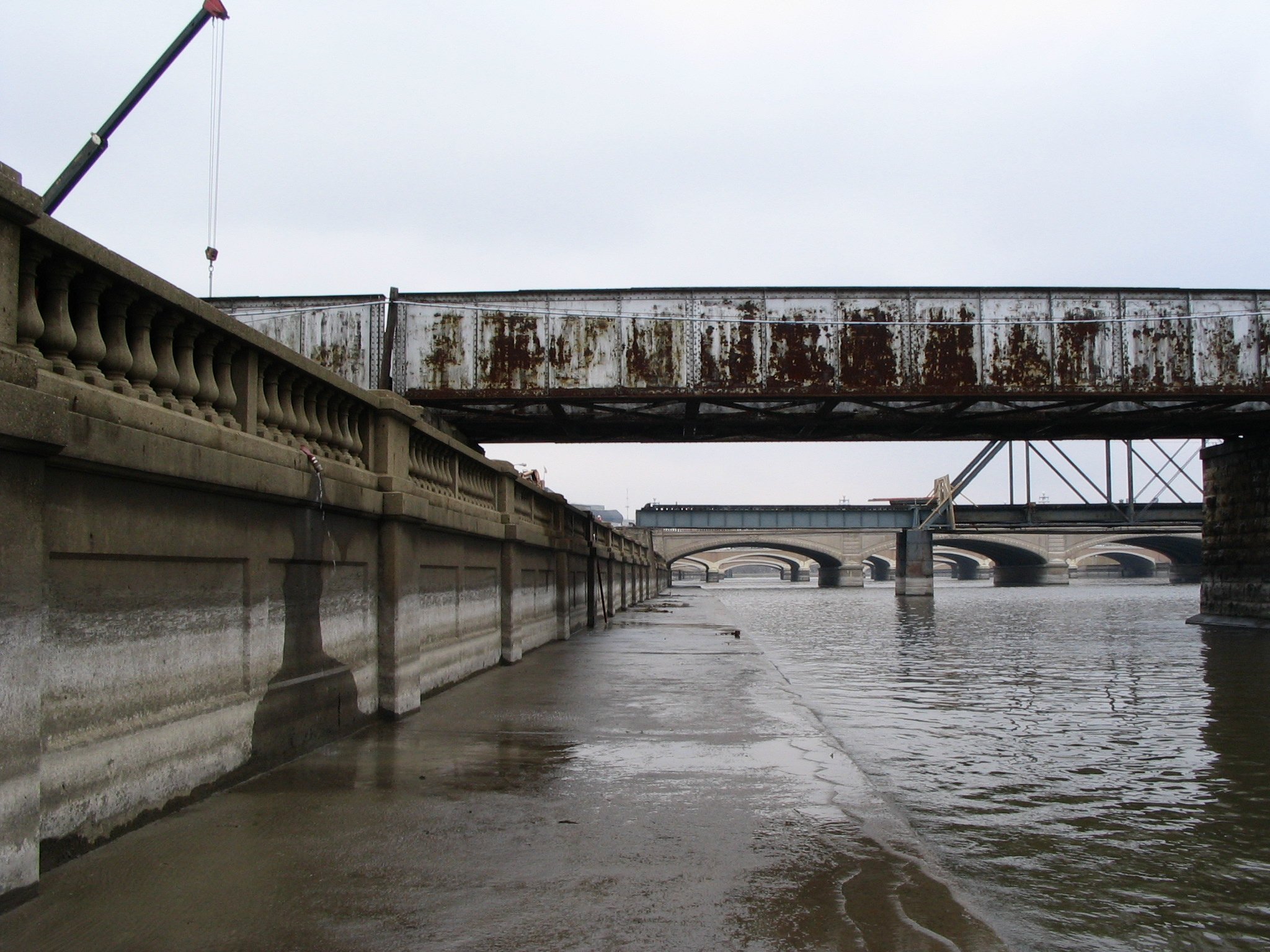
The Des Moines River, as it flows through downtown Des Moines, west bank, during spring high water; note the old watermarks on the flood wall.

== Flooding ==
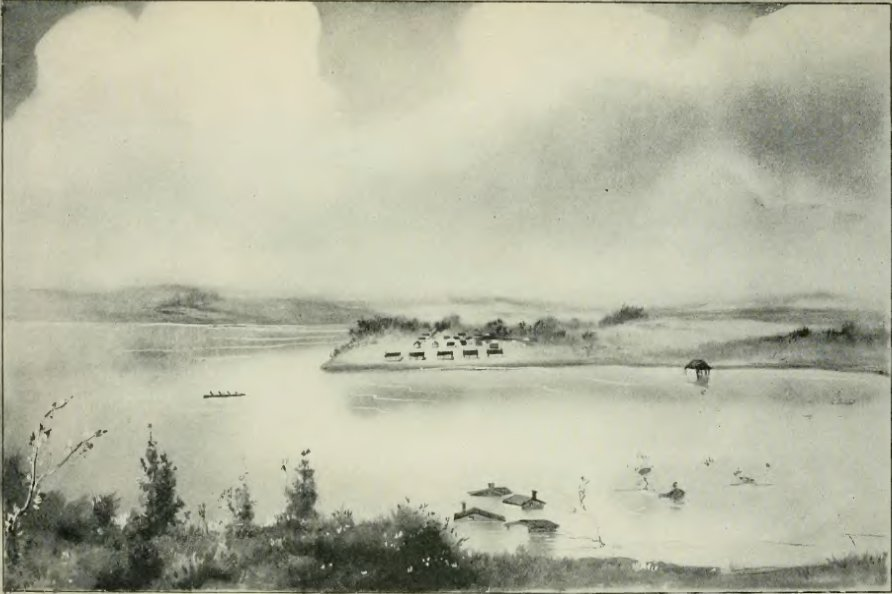
Flood of Des Moines, 1851

Catastrophic flooding occurred along the Des Moines River during the Great Flood of 1851, nearly destroying the new town of Des Moines. Residents had never previously experienced a major flood, and river towns lacked levees and substantial bridges that could withstand flooding. In 1851, 74.5 in (191.5 cm) of rain fell in Iowa, a record that holds to this day. The worst flooding occurred May to June in the Des Moines River Basin. Major flooding in 1851 occurred in Bentonsport, Croton, Bonaparte, Des Moines, Eddyville, Farmington, Iowaville, Keosauqua, Muscatine, Oskaloosa, Ottumwa and Rochester.

The river has a history of seasonal flooding. For example, in May 1944 the Riverview Park had just opened for the season on May 19, 1944. At around dawn on May 23, the levee began to collapse. The river was too much to hold back. Quickly the breach in the levee grew to nearly 100 feet (30 m) wide, and the river water quickly enveloped all of the park and the surrounding area.

The Great Flood of 1993 on the river and its tributary the Raccoon, in the summer of 1993, forced the evacuation of much of the city of Des Moines and nearby communities.

== Cities and towns ==
- Algona, Iowa (East Fork)
- Armstrong, Iowa (East Fork)
- Bonaparte, Iowa
- Bradgate, Iowa (West Fork)
- Chillicothe, Iowa
- Currie, Minnesota
- Dakota City, Iowa (East Fork)
- Des Moines, Iowa
- Douds, Iowa
- Eddyville, Iowa
- Eldon, Iowa
- Emmetsburg, Iowa (West Fork)
- Estherville, Iowa (West Fork)
- Farmington, Iowa
- Fort Dodge, Iowa
- Fraser, Iowa
- Graettinger, Iowa (West Fork)
- Humboldt, Iowa (West Fork)
- Irvington, Iowa (East Fork)
- Jackson, Minnesota
- Johnston, Iowa
- Keokuk, Iowa
- Keosauqua, Iowa
- Leando, Iowa
- Lehigh, Iowa
- Livermore, Iowa (East Fork)
- Ottumwa, Iowa
- Petersburg, Minnesota (West Fork)
- Rutland, Iowa (West Fork)
- St. Joseph, Iowa (East Fork)
- Windom, Minnesota

A railroad bridge on the Des Moines River near its mouth

== Variant names ==
According to the Geographic Names Information System, the Des Moines River has also been known as:

- La Riviere des Moins
- Le Moine River
- Monk River
- Nadouessioux River
- Outontantes River
- River Demoin
- River of the Maskoutens
- River of the Peouareas

== See also ==
- List of longest rivers of the United States (by main stem)
- List of Iowa rivers
- List of Minnesota rivers
- List of Missouri rivers
- Illinois Country
- French colonization of the Americas
