= Iowa Highway 202 =

State highway in Iowa, United States

Iowa Highway 202
- Iowa 202 highlighted in red

Route information
- Maintained by Iowa DOT
- Length: 10.461 mi (16.835 km)
- Existed: 1969–present

Major junctions
- South end: Route 202 at Coatsville, Mo.
- North end: Iowa 2 near Moulton

Location
- Country: United States
- State: Iowa
- Counties: Davis; Appanoose

Highway system
- Iowa Primary Highway System; Interstate; US; State; Secondary; Scenic
← Iowa 196	→ Iowa 210

Iowa Highway 202 (Iowa 202) is a short state highway in southern Iowa. The route begins at the Missouri state line, where it continues as Missouri Route 202, and ends at Iowa Highway 2 north of Moulton.

== Route description ==
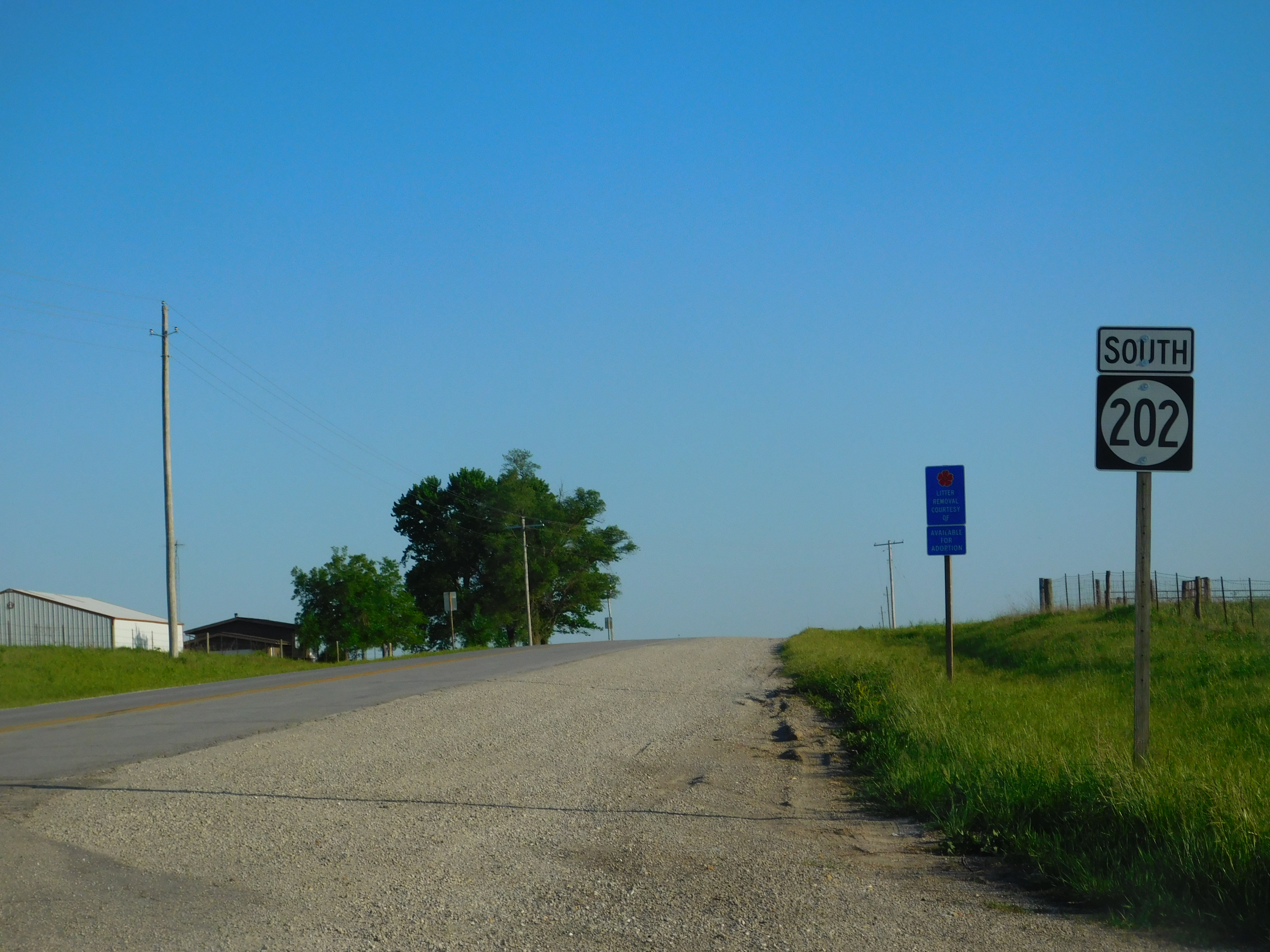
IA 202 southbound from IA 2

Iowa Highway 202 begins in Fabius Township, in Davis County, at the Missouri state line just north of Coatsville, Missouri. It continues in Missouri as Route 202. For its first 8 miles (13 km), it runs parallel to a former line of the Norfolk & Western railroad. Because of its proximity to the abandoned rail line, Iowa 202 follows an unusual path; heading northeast, turning north, and then turning northwest into Appanoose County. It continues to the northwest for 5 miles (8.0 km) before going through an ess curve which points Iowa 202 to the north towards Moulton. North of Moulton, Iowa 202 continues due north for 3 miles (4.8 km), ending at Iowa Highway 2 in Washington Township.

== History ==
The section from Iowa Highway 2 to Moulton was designated in 1920 as Primary Road No. 71. In the 1926 Iowa highway renumbering, Primary Road No. 71 was renumbered as Iowa Highway 142 to avoid conflict with US 71. In 1938, Iowa 142 extended south to the Missouri state line. Iowa 142 was renumbered Iowa Highway 202 in the 1969 Iowa highway renumbering. No changes to the route have occurred since its designation.

== Major intersections ==
County	Location	mi	km	Destinations	Notes
Davis	Fabius Township	0.000	0.000	Route 202 south – Coatsville	
Appanoose	Washington Township	10.461	16.835	Iowa 2 – Centerville, Bloomfield	
1.000 mi = 1.609 km; 1.000 km = 0.621 mi
