= West Grove Township, Davis County, Iowa =

West Grove Township
- Township
- Location in Davis County
- Coordinates: 40°42′12″N 92°34′04″W
- Country: United States
- State: Iowa
- County: Davis

Area
  - Total: 36.54 sq mi (94.65 km^{2})
  - Land: 36.44 sq mi (94.38 km^{2})
  - Water: 0.10 sq mi (0.27 km^{2}) 0.29%
- Elevation: 935 ft (285 m)

Population (2000)
  - Total: 456
  - Density: 12/sq mi (4.8/km^{2})
- GNIS feature ID: 0468980

West Grove Township is a township in Davis County, Iowa, United States. As of the 2000 census, its population was 456.

== History ==
West Grove Township was organized in 1874.

== Geography ==
West Grove Township covers an area of 36.54 square miles (94.65 square kilometers); of this, 0.1 square miles (0.27 square kilometers) or 0.29 percent is water.

=== Unincorporated towns ===
- West Grove

(This list is based on USGS data and may include former settlements.)

=== Adjacent townships ===
- Fox River Township (north)
- Cleveland Township (east)
- Wyacondah Township (southeast)
- Fabius Township (south)
- Wells Township, Appanoose County (southwest)
- Washington Township, Appanoose County (west)

=== Cemeteries ===
The township contains eight cemeteries: Bell, Bethel, Evergreen, Hetzler, John, Mount Moriah, Shinn and West Grove.

=== Major highways ===
- U.S. Route 63
