= Marion Township, Davis County, Iowa =

Marion Township
- Township
- Location in Davis County
- Coordinates: 40°51′11″N 92°35′01″W
- Country: United States
- State: Iowa
- County: Davis

Area
  - Total: 35.66 sq mi (92.35 km^{2})
  - Land: 35.31 sq mi (91.46 km^{2})
  - Water: 0.34 sq mi (0.89 km^{2}) 0.96%
- Elevation: 906 ft (276 m)

Population (2000)
  - Total: 218
  - Density: 6.2/sq mi (2.4/km^{2})
- GNIS feature ID: 0468350

Marion Township is a township in Davis County, Iowa, United States. As of the 2000 census, its population was 218.

== History ==
Marion Township was organized in 1846. It is named for General Francis Marion.

== Geography ==
Marion Township covers an area of 35.66 square miles (92.35 square kilometers); of this, 0.34 square miles (0.89 square kilometers) or 0.96 percent is water. The streams of Pee Dee Creek, Pepper Creek and South Soap Creek run through this township.

=== Unincorporated towns ===
- Ash Grove
- Blackhawk

(This list is based on USGS data and may include former settlements.)

=== Adjacent townships ===
- Adams Township, Wapello County (north)
- Green Township, Wapello County (northeast)
- Soap Creek Township (east)
- Drakesville Township (southeast)
- Fox River Township (south)
- Udell Township, Appanoose County (southwest)
- Union Township, Appanoose County (west)
- Urbana Township, Monroe County (northwest)

=== Cemeteries ===
The township contains eight cemeteries: Adams, Bailey, Edwards, Glassburner, Hanson, Mounts, Wesley Chapel and Wheeler.
