= Fox River Township, Davis County, Iowa =

Fox River Township
- Township
- Location in Davis County
- Coordinates: 40°46′40″N 92°34′56″W
- Country: United States
- State: Iowa
- County: Davis

Area
  - Total: 28.1 sq mi (72.7 km^{2})
  - Land: 27.92 sq mi (72.31 km^{2})
  - Water: 0.15 sq mi (0.4 km^{2}) 0.55%
- Elevation: 883 ft (269 m)

Population (2000)
  - Total: 330
  - Density: 12/sq mi (4.6/km^{2})
- GNIS feature ID: 0467846

Fox River Township is a township in Davis County, Iowa, United States. As of the 2000 census, its population was 330.

== History ==
Fox River Township was organized in 1846. It was named from the Fox River.

== Geography ==
Fox River Township covers an area of 28.07 square miles (72.7 square kilometers); of this, 0.15 square miles (0.4 square kilometers) or 0.55 percent is water. The streams of Center Branch Fox River and North Fox Creek run through this township.

=== Unincorporated towns ===
- Paris

(This list is based on USGS data and may include former settlements.)

=== Adjacent townships ===
- Marion Township (north)
- Cleveland Township (east)
- Drakesville Township (east)
- West Grove Township (south)
- Washington Township, Appanoose County (southwest)
- Udell Township, Appanoose County (west)

=== Cemeteries ===
The township contains seven cemeteries: Baptist, Hammans, McConnell, Paris, Pelly, Runkles and West Union.
