= Van Buren Community School District =

Defunct school district in Iowa, United States

Van Buren Community School District is a school district headquartered in Keosauqua, Iowa, United States.

It serves sections of Van Buren and Davis counties. The district serves the following incorporated communities: Keosauqua, Birmingham, Cantril, Milton, and Stockport. It also served two census-designated places in unincorporated Van Buren County; Douds and Leando.

== History ==
On July 1, 2004, the Fox Valley Community School District merged into the Van Buren district.

In January 2016 the Harmony district and the Harmony Community School District agreed to begin a grade-sharing arrangement in which Harmony-zoned students attended Van Buren schools for grades 7–12. This arrangement began in fall 2016. The Harmony district's junior and senior high school closed the previous spring.

Impetus to merge came to changes on how the Iowa state government gave money to schools as well as decreasing numbers of students. In January 2018 the administrations of the Van Buren and Harmony districts began to consider merging. In February 2018 83% of the voters in the Van Buren and Harmony districts voted to merge, with 94% (of 637 voters) in favor in the pre-merger Van Buren district and 72% (of 619 voters) in favor in the pre-merger Harmony district.

The requirement for a merge was for both districts to each have over 50% of voters in favor.

There was a single superintendent and school board for both areas beginning on July 1, 2019. On that day the Van Buren County Community School District formed.

== Schools ==
List of schools:

- Van Buren Jr./Sr. High School (Keosauqua)
- Douds Elementary School (Douds)
- Stockport Elementary School (Stockport) – Closed in 2012–13

There was a middle school in Stockport, but in 2011 Van Buren CSD school board chose to close that building and move the middle school to Keosauqua. The vote was a 4-2 basis, and done to reduce expenses.
