= Pulaski, Iowa =

- City
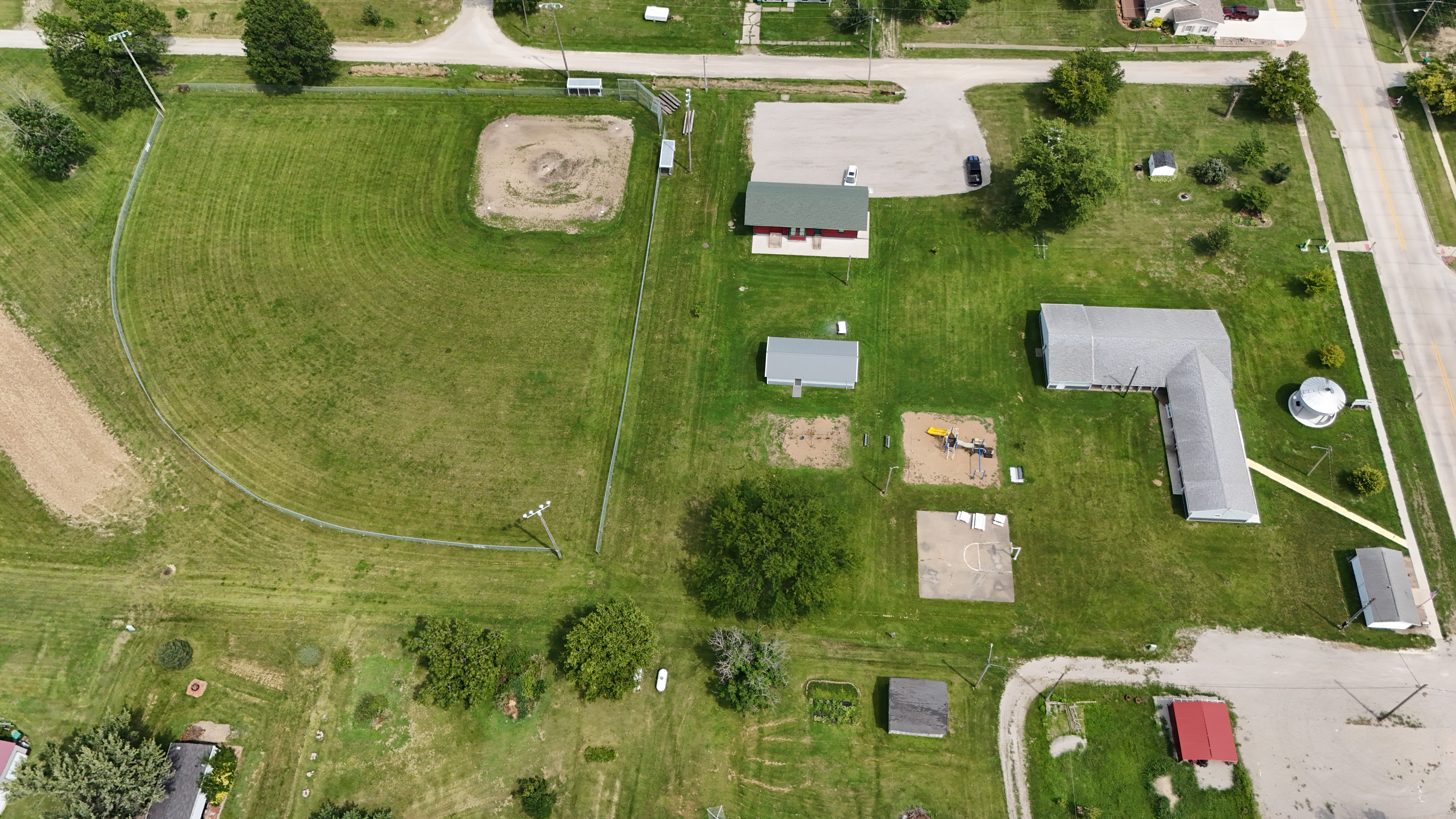
- An aerial view of Pulaski Park

- Location of Pulaski, Iowa
- Coordinates: 40°41′39″N 92°16′26″W
- Country: USA
- State: Iowa
- County: Davis

Area
  - Total: 0.44 sq mi (1.14 km^{2})
  - Land: 0.44 sq mi (1.14 km^{2})
  - Water: 0 sq mi (0.00 km^{2})
- Elevation: 833 ft (254 m)

Population (2020)
  - Total: 264
  - Density: 602/sq mi (232.5/km^{2})
- Time zone: UTC-6 (Central (CST))
  - Summer (DST): UTC-5 (CDT)
- ZIP code: 52584
- Area code: 641
- FIPS code: 19-65055
- GNIS feature ID: 2396291

Pulaski is a city in Davis County, Iowa, United States. The population was 264 at the time of the 2020 census.

== History ==
Pulaski was founded in 1856. It is named for Casimir Pulaski.

== Corn show ==
The Pulaski Corn Show, held annually on a September weekend, is a citywide celebration with a parade.

== Geography ==
Pulaski is located on Iowa Highway 2 southeast of the county seat of Bloomfield and west of Milton.

According to the United States Census Bureau, the city has a total area of 0.51 square miles (1.32 km^{2}), all land.

=== Transportation ===
Iowa Highway 2 passes through Pulaski.

== Demographics ==
Historical populations
Year	Pop.	±%
1880	196	—
1900	302	+54.1%
1910	382	+26.5%
1920	419	+9.7%
1930	376	−10.3%
1940	400	+6.4%
1950	381	−4.7%
1960	299	−21.5%
1970	255	−14.7%
1980	267	+4.7%
1990	262	−1.9%
2000	249	−5.0%
2010	260	+4.4%
2020	264	+1.5%
Source:"U.S. Census website". United States Census Bureau. and Iowa Data Center; Source: U.S. Decennial Census

=== 2020 census ===
As of the census of 2020, there were 264 people, 104 households, and 80 families residing in the city. The population density was 602.2 inhabitants per square mile (232.5/km^{2}). There were 111 housing units at an average density of 253.2 per square mile (97.8/km^{2}). The racial makeup of the city was 95.1% White, 0.0% Black or African American, 0.4% Native American, 0.0% Asian, 0.0% Pacific Islander, 0.0% from other races and 4.5% from two or more races. Hispanic or Latino persons of any race comprised 1.5% of the population.

Of the 104 households, 41.3% of which had children under the age of 18 living with them, 51.0% were married couples living together, 8.7% were cohabitating couples, 24.0% had a female householder with no spouse or partner present and 16.3% had a male householder with no spouse or partner present. 23.1% of all households were non-families. 13.5% of all households were made up of individuals, 7.7% had someone living alone who was 65 years old or older.

The median age in the city was 37.4 years. 29.9% of the residents were under the age of 20; 3.8% were between the ages of 20 and 24; 25.4% were from 25 and 44; 25.4% were from 45 and 64; and 15.5% were 65 years of age or older. The gender makeup of the city was 48.1% male and 51.9% female.

=== 2010 census ===
As of the census of 2010, there were 260 people, 104 households, and 80 families residing in the city. The population density was 509.8 inhabitants per square mile (196.8/km^{2}). There were 117 housing units at an average density of 229.4 per square mile (88.6/km^{2}). The racial makeup of the city was 100.0% White. Hispanic or Latino of any race were 0.8% of the population.

There were 104 households, of which 38.5% had children under the age of 18 living with them, 57.7% were married couples living together, 10.6% had a female householder with no husband present, 8.7% had a male householder with no wife present, and 23.1% were non-families. 20.2% of all households were made up of individuals, and 5.8% had someone living alone who was 65 years of age or older. The average household size was 2.50 and the average family size was 2.83.

The median age in the city was 39.7 years. 26.5% of residents were under the age of 18; 8.1% were between the ages of 18 and 24; 21.6% were from 25 to 44; 30% were from 45 to 64; and 13.8% were 65 years of age or older. The gender makeup of the city was 52.7% male and 47.3% female.

=== 2000 census ===
As of the census of 2000, there were 249 people, 103 households, and 70 families residing in the city. The population density was 669.3 inhabitants per square mile (258.4/km^{2}). There were 113 housing units at an average density of 303.7 per square mile (117.3/km^{2}). The racial makeup of the city was 97.19% White, 0.40% Native American, and 2.41% from two or more races.

There were 103 households, out of which 31.1% had children under the age of 18 living with them, 59.2% were married couples living together, 3.9% had a female householder with no husband present, and 32.0% were non-families. 30.1% of all households were made up of individuals, and 24.3% had someone living alone who was 65 years of age or older. The average household size was 2.42 and the average family size was 2.99.

In the city, the population was spread out, with 27.7% under the age of 18, 4.0% from 18 to 24, 24.5% from 25 to 44, 25.3% from 45 to 64, and 18.5% who were 65 years of age or older. The median age was 40 years. For every 100 females, there were 84.4 males. For every 100 females age 18 and over, there were 80.0 males.

The median income for a household in the city was $30,694, and the median income for a family was $38,750. Males had a median income of $24,318 versus $23,750 for females. The per capita income for the city was $14,334. About 6.6% of families and 10.8% of the population were below the poverty line, including 19.7% of those under the age of eighteen and 14.0% of those 65 or over.

== See also ==
- List of cities in Iowa
