= Drakesville Township, Davis County, Iowa =

Drakesville Township
- Township
- Location in Davis County
- Coordinates: 40°47′48″N 92°29′28″W
- Country: United States
- State: Iowa
- County: Davis

Area
  - Total: 12.07 sq mi (31.27 km^{2})
  - Land: 12.06 sq mi (31.24 km^{2})
  - Water: 0.012 sq mi (0.03 km^{2}) 0.1%
- Elevation: 890 ft (270 m)

Population (2000)
  - Total: 457
  - Density: 38/sq mi (14.6/km^{2})
- GNIS feature ID: 0467742

Drakesville Township is a township in Davis County, Iowa, United States. As of the 2000 census, its population was 457.

== History ==
Drakeville Township is named for J. H. Drake, a pioneer settler.

== Geography ==
Drakesville Township covers an area of 12.07 square miles (31.27 square kilometers); of this, 0.01 square miles (0.03 square kilometers) or 0.1 percent is water.

=== Cities and towns ===
- Drakesville

=== Adjacent townships ===
- Soap Creek Township (north)
- Cleveland Township (southeast)
- Fox River Township (west)
- Marion Township (northwest)

=== Cemeteries ===
The township contains one cemetery, Drakesville.
