= Soap Creek Township, Davis County, Iowa =

Soap Creek Township
- Township
- Location in Davis County
- Coordinates: 40°51′47″N 92°28′11″W
- Country: United States
- State: Iowa
- County: Davis

Area
  - Total: 34.90 sq mi (90.38 km^{2})
  - Land: 34.85 sq mi (90.25 km^{2})
  - Water: 0.050 sq mi (0.13 km^{2}) 0.14%
- Elevation: 814 ft (248 m)

Population (2000)
  - Total: 610
  - Density: 18/sq mi (6.8/km^{2})
- GNIS feature ID: 0468724

Soap Creek Township is a township in Davis County, Iowa, United States. As of the 2000 census, its population was 610.

== History ==
Soap Creek Township was organized in 1846. It took its name from Soap Creek.

== Geography ==
Soap Creek Township covers an area of 34.9 square miles (90.38 square kilometers); of this, 0.05 square miles (0.13 square kilometers) or 0.14 percent is water. The stream of Bear Creek runs through this township.

=== Unincorporated towns ===
- Belknap
- Carbon

(This list is based on USGS data and may include former settlements.)

=== Adjacent townships ===
- Green Township, Wapello County (north)
- Keokuk Township, Wapello County (northeast)
- Lick Creek Township (east)
- Cleveland Township (southeast)
- Perry Township (southeast)
- Drakesville Township (south)
- Marion Township (west)
- Adams Township, Wapello County (northwest)

=== Cemeteries ===
The township contains eight cemeteries: Baer, Breeding, Harbour, Kingdom, Rime, Roland, Rudd and Sherman Chapel.

=== Major highways ===
- U.S. Route 63
