= Coatesville =

Coatesville or Coatsville may refer to:

- Coatesville, Indiana
- Coatsville, Missouri
- Coatesville, Pennsylvania
- Coatesville, New Zealand
- a locality in the suburb of Bentleigh East, Melbourne, Australia
