= Soap Creek (Des Moines River tributary) =

Stream in the US state of Iowa

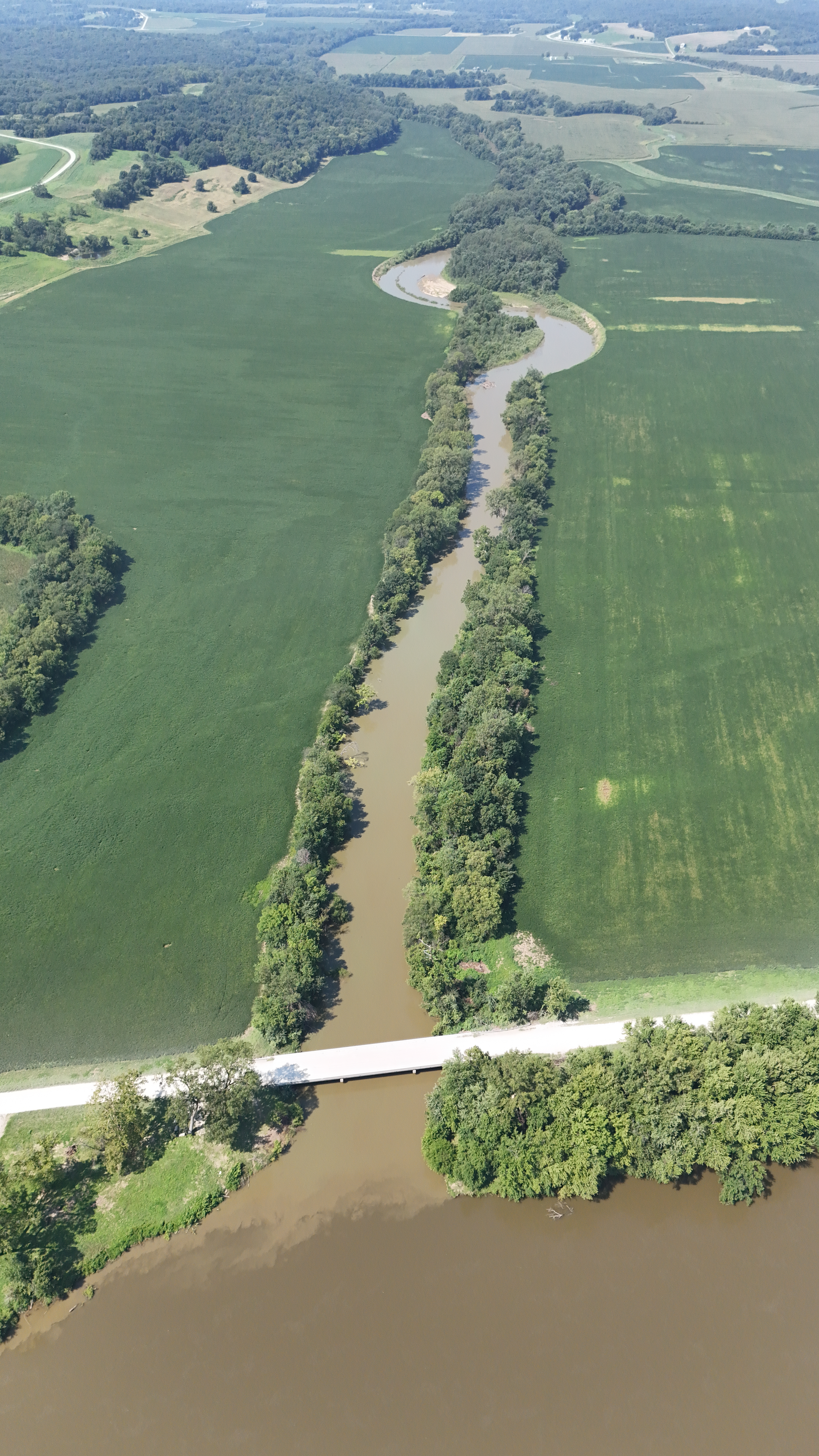
Soap Creek flowing into the Des Moines River (at bottom)

Soap Creek is a stream in Monroe, Appanoose, Davis and Wapello counties of Iowa. It is a tributary of the Des Moines River.

The stream headwaters arise in Monroe County at 40°56′34″N 92°50′26″W adjacent to the west side of Iowa Highway 5 approximately six miles south-southwest of Albia. The stream flows east and then southeast to pass through the northeast corner of Appanoose County and into Davis County. It flows southeast through a section of the Soap Creek Water Management Area to turn to the east just north of the community of Blackhawk. The stream continues east through northeastern Davis County passing under US Route 63 and north of the community of Floris. It enters the southeast corner of Wapello County and its confluence with the Des Moines River just south of the city of Eldon at 40°53′57″N 92°12′49″W.
