= Fabius Township, Davis County, Iowa =

Fabius Township
- Township
- Location in Davis County
- Coordinates: 40°37′47″N 92°34′39″W
- Country: United States
- State: Iowa
- County: Davis

Area
  - Total: 35.85 sq mi (92.85 km^{2})
  - Land: 35.8 sq mi (92.8 km^{2})
  - Water: 0.019 sq mi (0.05 km^{2}) 0.05%
- Elevation: 925 ft (282 m)

Population (2000)
  - Total: 169
  - Density: 4.7/sq mi (1.8/km^{2})
- GNIS feature ID: 0467805

Fabius Township is a township in Davis County, Iowa, United States. As of the 2000 census, its population was 169.

== History ==
Fabius Township was organized in 1846. It is named from Fabius Creek.

== Geography ==
Fabius Township covers an area of 35.85 square miles (92.85 square kilometers); of this, 0.02 square miles (0.05 square kilometers) or 0.05 percent is water.

=== Unincorporated towns ===
- Monterey
- Russellville (historical)

(This list is based on USGS data and may include former settlements.)

=== Adjacent townships ===
- West Grove Township (north)
- Wyacondah Township (east)
- Wells Township, Appanoose County (west)

=== Cemeteries ===
The township contains six cemeteries: Burgher, Hopkins, Horn, Johnson, Newton and Washington.

=== Major highways ===
- U.S. Route 63
