= Floris, Iowa =

- City
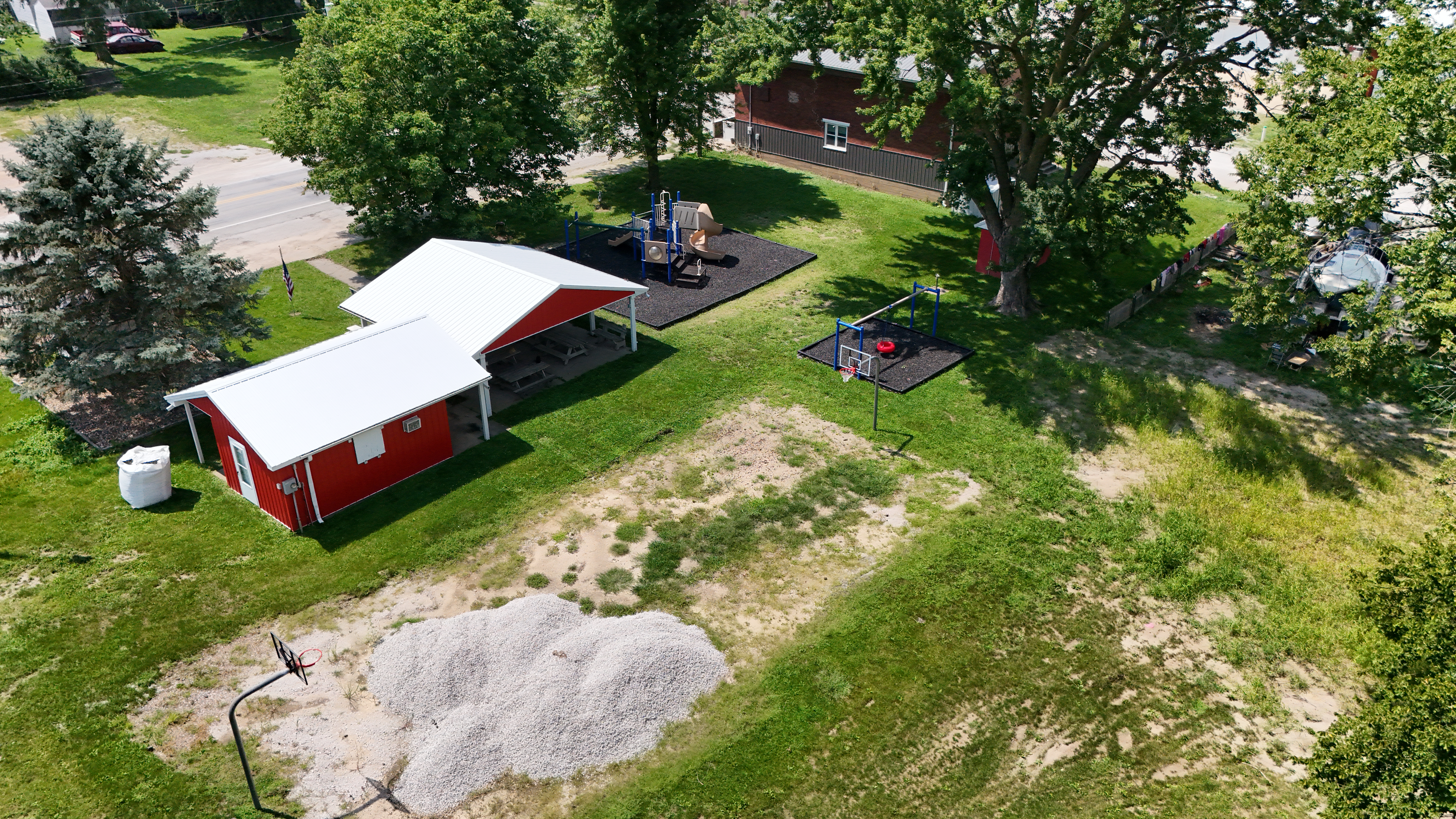
- Floris, Iowa City Park

- Location of Floris, Iowa
- Coordinates: 40°51′52″N 92°19′58″W
- Country: USA
- State: Iowa
- County: Davis

Area
  - Total: 0.59 sq mi (1.52 km^{2})
  - Land: 0.59 sq mi (1.52 km^{2})
  - Water: 0 sq mi (0.00 km^{2})
- Elevation: 696 ft (212 m)

Population (2020)
  - Total: 116
  - Density: 198.0/sq mi (76.46/km^{2})
- Time zone: UTC-6 (Central (CST))
  - Summer (DST): UTC-5 (CDT)
- ZIP code: 52560
- Area code: 641
- FIPS code: 19-27975
- GNIS feature ID: 2394776

Floris is a city in Davis County, Iowa, United States. The population was 116 at the time of the 2020 census.

== History ==
A post office was opened at Floris in 1847.

== Geography ==
Floris is located on the south margin of the Soap Creek floodplain. It is approximately 8.5 miles north-northeast of Bloomfield.

According to the United States Census Bureau, the city has a total area of 0.48 square miles (1.24 km^{2}), all land.

== Demographics ==
Historical populations
Year	Pop.	±%
1920	252	—
1930	209	−17.1%
1940	247	+18.2%
1950	215	−13.0%
1960	187	−13.0%
1970	145	−22.5%
1980	187	+29.0%
1990	172	−8.0%
2000	153	−11.0%
2010	138	−9.8%
2020	116	−15.9%
Source:"U.S. Census website". United States Census Bureau. and Iowa Data Center; Source: U.S. Decennial Census

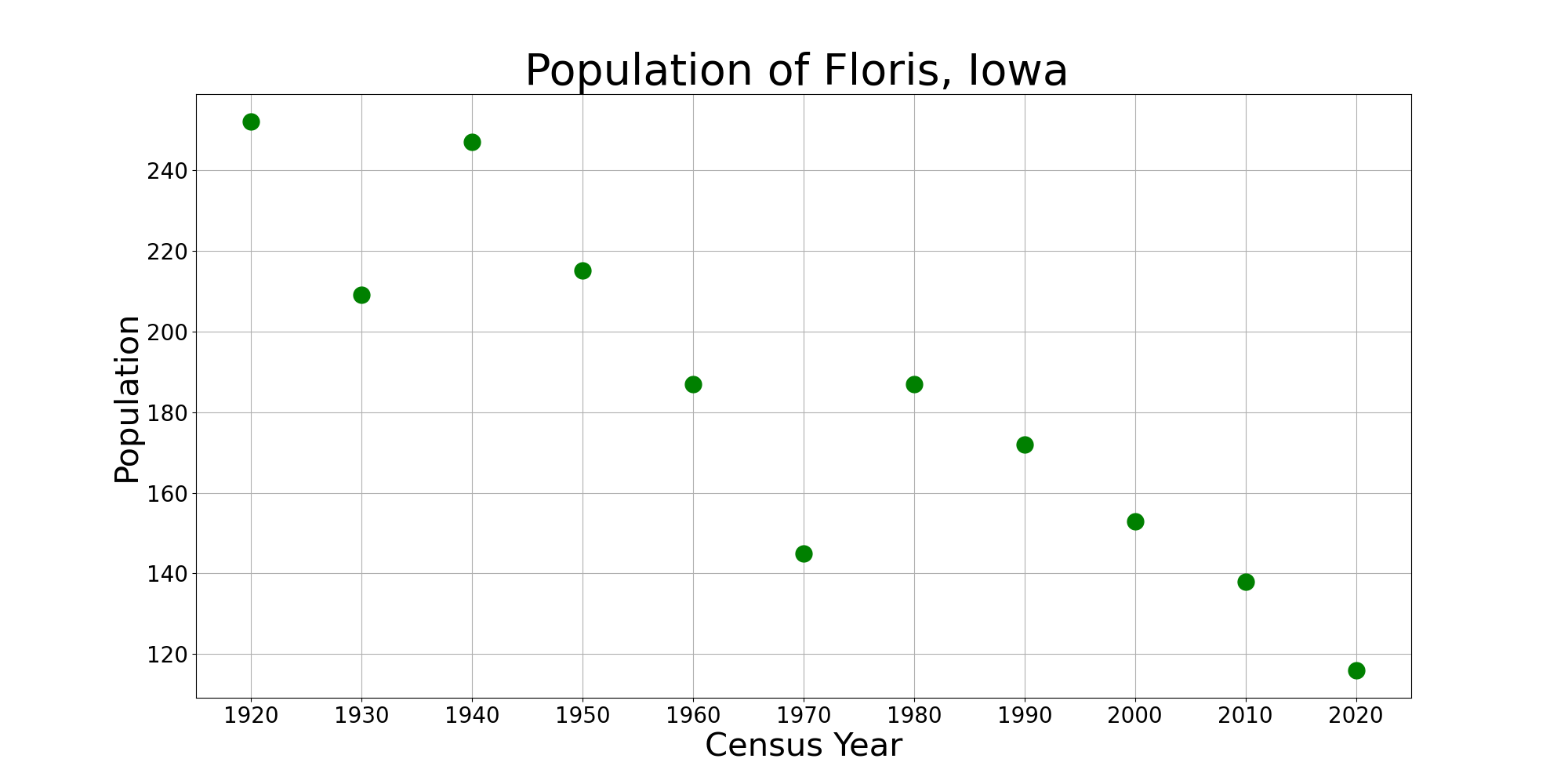
The population of Floris, Iowa from US census data

=== 2020 census ===
As of the census of 2020, there were 116 people, 42 households, and 32 families residing in the city. The population density was 198.0 inhabitants per square mile (76.5/km^{2}). There were 58 housing units at an average density of 99.0 per square mile (38.2/km^{2}). The racial makeup of the city was 96.6% White, 0.0% Black or African American, 0.0% Native American, 0.0% Asian, 0.0% Pacific Islander, 0.0% from other races and 3.4% from two or more races. Hispanic or Latino persons of any race comprised 3.4% of the population.

Of the 42 households, 40.5% of which had children under the age of 18 living with them, 52.4% were married couples living together, 7.1% were cohabitating couples, 21.4% had a female householder with no spouse or partner present and 19.0% had a male householder with no spouse or partner present. 23.8% of all households were non-families. 19.0% of all households were made up of individuals, 19.0% had someone living alone who was 65 years old or older.

The median age in the city was 43.0 years. 29.3% of the residents were under the age of 20; 2.6% were between the ages of 20 and 24; 20.7% were from 25 and 44; 25.9% were from 45 and 64; and 21.6% were 65 years of age or older. The gender makeup of the city was 51.7% male and 48.3% female.

=== 2010 census ===
As of the census of 2010, there were 138 people, 58 households, and 41 families living in the city. The population density was 287.5 inhabitants per square mile (111.0/km^{2}). There were 62 housing units at an average density of 129.2 per square mile (49.9/km^{2}). The racial makeup of the city was 99.3% White and 0.7% from two or more races. Hispanic or Latino of any race were 0.7% of the population.

There were 58 households, of which 27.6% had children under the age of 18 living with them, 60.3% were married couples living together, 3.4% had a female householder with no husband present, 6.9% had a male householder with no wife present, and 29.3% were non-families. 24.1% of all households were made up of individuals, and 20.6% had someone living alone who was 65 years of age or older. The average household size was 2.38 and the average family size was 2.80.

The median age in the city was 45 years. 23.2% of residents were under the age of 18; 5.7% were between the ages of 18 and 24; 21% were from 25 to 44; 28.9% were from 45 to 64; and 21% were 65 years of age or older. The gender makeup of the city was 50.0% male and 50.0% female.

=== 2000 census ===
As of the census of 2000, there were 153 people, 61 households, and 42 families living in the city. The population density was 316.3 inhabitants per square mile (122.1/km^{2}). There were 68 housing units at an average density of 140.6 per square mile (54.3/km^{2}). The racial makeup of the city was 98.69% White and 1.31% Asian. Hispanic or Latino of any race were 2.61% of the population.

There were 61 households, out of which 36.1% had children under the age of 18 living with them, 50.8% were married couples living together, 8.2% had a female householder with no husband present, and 31.1% were non-families. 26.2% of all households were made up of individuals, and 16.4% had someone living alone who was 65 years of age or older. The average household size was 2.51 and the average family size was 3.00.

In the city, the population was spread out, with 28.1% under the age of 18, 6.5% from 18 to 24, 25.5% from 25 to 44, 24.2% from 45 to 64, and 15.7% who were 65 years of age or older. The median age was 39 years. For every 100 females, there were 98.7 males. For every 100 females age 18 and over, there were 96.4 males.

The median income for a household in the city was $19,375, and the median income for a family was $27,917. Males had a median income of $26,250 versus $3,750 for females. The per capita income for the city was $9,438. About 21.4% of families and 22.4% of the population were below the poverty line, including 31.7% of those under the age of eighteen and none of those 65 or over.

== Education ==
The Davis County Community School District operates local area public schools.
