= Davis County Community School District =

Public school district in Bloomfield, Iowa, United States

Coordinates: 40.744169°N 92.413807°W

Location
- Bloomfield, Iowa Davis County and Van Buren County United States
- Coordinates: 40.744169, -92.413807

District information
- Type: Local school district
- Grades: K-12
- Superintendent: Dan Maeder
- Schools: 3
- Budget: $20,892,000 (2020-21)
- NCES District ID: 1908610

Students and staff
- Students: 1263 (2022-23)
- Teachers: 90.62 FTE
- Staff: 95.09 FTE
- Student–teacher ratio: 13.94
- Athletic conference: South Central
- District mascot: Mustangs
- Colors: Maroon and Gold

Other information
- Website: www.dcmustangs.com

The Davis County Community School District is a rural public school district headquartered in Bloomfield, Iowa.

The district covers most of Davis County, with a small area in Van Buren County. It serves the city of Bloomfield, the towns of Drakesville, Floris, and the surrounding rural areas.

The school's athletic teams are the Mustangs, and their colors are maroon and gold.

Dan Maeder has been the superintendent since 2012.

== Schools ==
The district operates three schools, all in Bloomfield:

- Davis County Community Elementary School
- Davis County Community Middle School
- Davis County Community High School

=== Davis County Community High School ===
==== Athletics ====
The Mustangs participate in the South Central Conference in the following sports.

- Football
- Cross Country
- Volleyball
- Basketball
- Wrestling
- Golf
- Tennis
- Track and Field
  - Boys' 2-time State Champions (1980, 1981)
  - Girls' 1995 Class 2A State Champions (as Davis County-Fox Valley)
- Baseball
  - 2011 Class 2A State Champions
- Softball

== See also ==
- List of school districts in Iowa
- List of high schools in Iowa
