= Missouri Route 202 =

State highway in Missouri, U.S.

Route 202
- MO 202 highlighted in red

Route information
- Maintained by MoDOT
- Length: 8.546 mi (13.753 km)

Major junctions
- South end: US 63 / US 136 in Lancaster
- North end: Iowa 202 at the Iowa state line

Location
- Country: United States
- State: Missouri

Highway system
- Missouri State Highway System; Interstate; US; State; Supplemental
| ← Route 190 | → Route 210 |

Route 202 is a short highway in extreme northern Missouri. It is wholly within Schuyler County. Its northern terminus is at the Iowa state line where it continues as Iowa Highway 202; its southern terminus is at the intersection of U.S. Route 63 and U.S. Route 136 in Lancaster.

== Route description ==
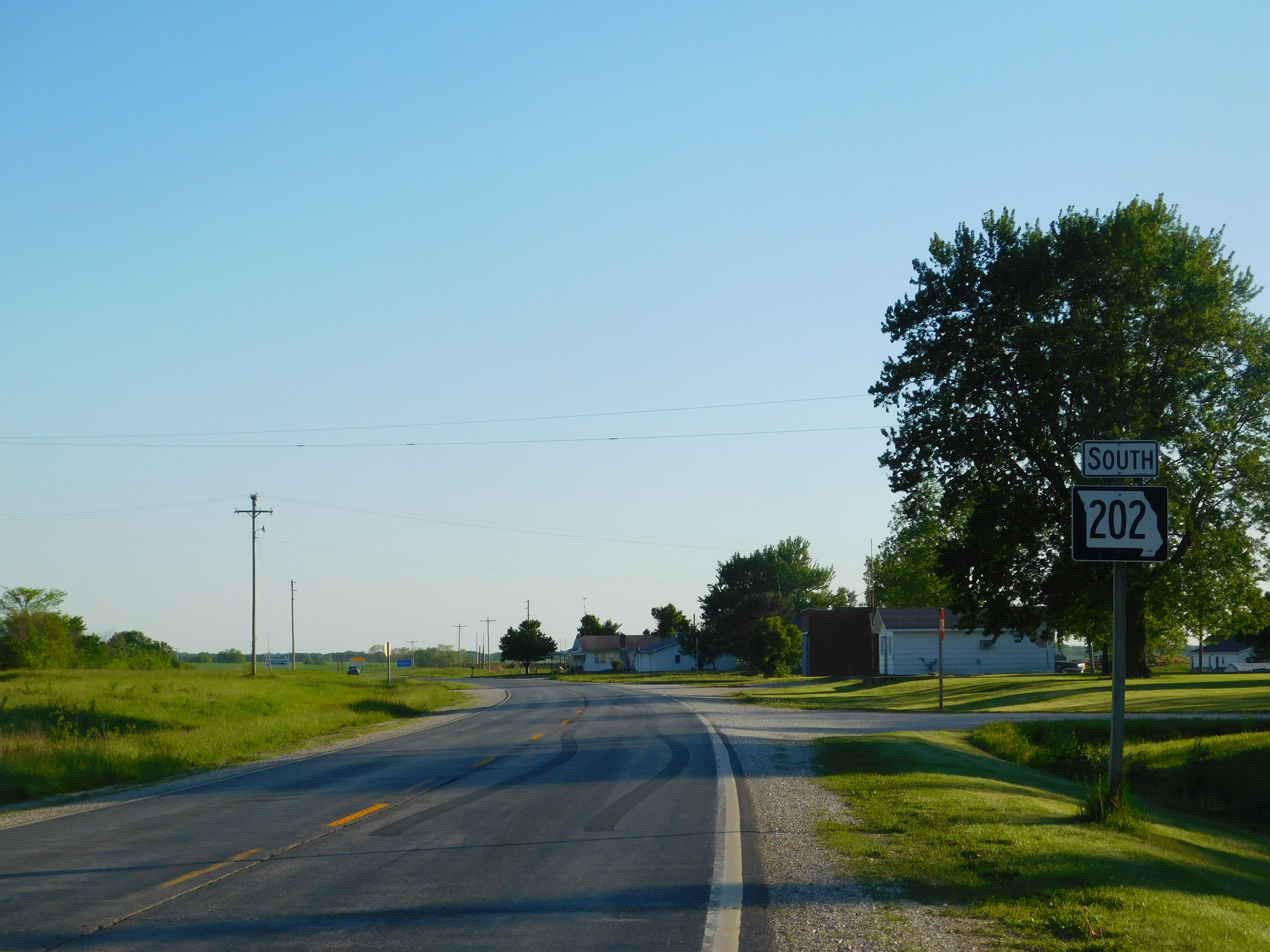
MO 202 in Coatsville

Route 202 begins at an intersection with US 63/US 136 in Lancaster, heading west on a two-lane undivided road. The road continues east past this intersection as part of US 136. From the southern terminus, the route runs through agricultural areas with some trees. Route 202 reaches Glenwood, where it becomes South Avenue and passes near residences, intersecting Route M. The route turns north onto an unnamed road, with Route AA continuing to the west. Route 202 curves to the northwest and leaves Glenwood, passing through more farmland. The road continues through more rural areas, intersecting Route F and Route Z. After the intersection with the latter, the route heads to the north. Route 202 curves northeast and passes a few homes in the community of Coatsville before coming to its northern terminus at the Iowa border, where the road continues into that state as Iowa 202.

== Major intersections ==
The entire route is in Schuyler County.

| Location | mi | km | Destinations | Notes |
|---|---|---|---|---|
| Lancaster | 0.000 | 0.000 | US 63 / US 136 | |
| Glenwood | 1.512 | 2.433 | Route M north (Fifth Street) | |
| Glenwood | 1.877 | 3.021 | Route AA west | |
| | 5.562 | 8.951 | Route F south | |
| | 6.039 | 9.719 | Route Z west | |
| Coatsville | 8.546 | 13.753 | Iowa 202 north | Iowa state line |
1.000 mi = 1.609 km; 1.000 km = 0.621 mi
