= Cleveland Township, Davis County, Iowa =

Cleveland Township
- Township
- Location in Davis County
- Coordinates: 40°44′29″N 92°24′26″W
- Country: United States
- State: Iowa
- County: Davis

Area
  - Total: 40.27 sq mi (104.29 km^{2})
  - Land: 40.03 sq mi (103.67 km^{2})
  - Water: 0.24 sq mi (0.62 km^{2}) 0.59%
- Elevation: 820 ft (250 m)

Population (2000)
  - Total: 675
  - Density: 17/sq mi (6.5/km^{2})
- GNIS feature ID: 0467623

Cleveland Township is a township in Davis County, Iowa, United States. As of the 2000 census, its population was 675.

Note that there have been several places named Cleveland elsewhere in Iowa. There was a Cleveland post office in Allamakee County from 1856 to 1863, and another just outside Lucas from 1877 to 1891 and 1899 to 1908.

== Geography ==
Cleveland Township covers an area of 40.27 square miles (104.29 square kilometers); of this, 0.24 square miles (0.62 square kilometers) or 0.59 percent is water.

=== Cities and towns ===
Cleveland Township surrounds, but does not include, the county seat of Bloomfield.

=== Unincorporated towns ===
- Steuben

(This list is based on USGS data and may include former settlements.)

=== Adjacent townships ===
- Lick Creek Township (northeast)
- Perry Township (northeast)
- Prairie Township (east)
- Union Township (east)
- Grove Township (southeast)
- Wyacondah Township (southwest)
- Fox River Township (west)
- West Grove Township (west)
- Bloomfield Township (northwest)
- Drakesville Township (northwest)
- Soap Creek Township (northwest)

=== Cemeteries ===
The township contains four cemeteries: Bloomfield South, Cammack, Lester and Pollard.

=== Major highways ===
- U.S. Route 63
