= Wickfield Round Barn =

- U.S. National Register of Historic Places
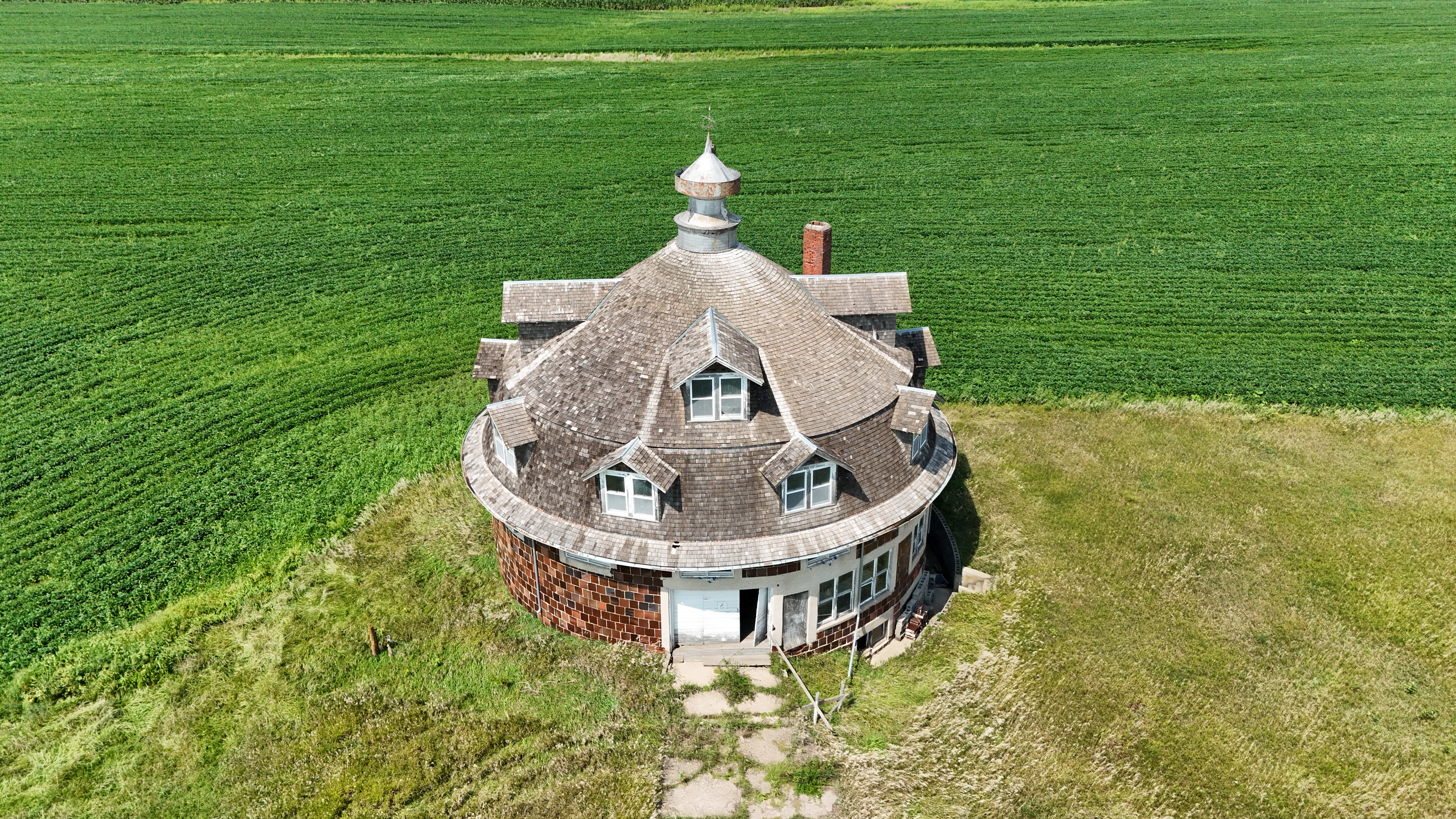

- Location within Iowa Location within the United States
- Location: Off Iowa Highway 2
- Nearest city: Cantril, Iowa
- Coordinates: 40°40′04.8″N 92°02′06.9″W
- Area: less than one acre
- Built: 1919
- Built by: Alva Hunt
- MPS: Iowa Round Barns: The Sixty Year Experiment TR
- NRHP reference No.: 86001447
- Added to NRHP: June 30, 1986

The Wickfield Round Barn is a historic sale barn building located near Cantril in rural Van Buren County, Iowa, United States. Originally called Silvers Sale Pavilion, it was built in 1919 by Alva Hunt for $20,000. The true round barn measures 50 feet (15 m) in diameter. Frank Silvers, a successful hog breeder and businessman, operated the largest Hampshire hog farm in the world. The first floor had seating for 700 people. Silvers' business offices were also located on the first floor. The structure is constructed of clay tile and features an aerator. The two-pitch roof features eight dormers on the lower part and four dormers on the upper part of the roof. It has been listed on the National Register of Historic Places since 1986. There are no round barns in Iowa used as sale barns any longer, and this one is used for storage.

It is claimed to be the "most unusual use of any round barn in the state and without doubt the most elaborate farm sale barn known to have existed."
