= Wyacondah Township, Davis County, Iowa =

Wyacondah Township
- Township
- Location in Davis County
- Coordinates: 40°39′11″N 92°27′47″W
- Country: United States
- State: Iowa
- County: Davis

Area
  - Total: 48.24 sq mi (124.95 km^{2})
  - Land: 48.11 sq mi (124.61 km^{2})
  - Water: 0.14 sq mi (0.35 km^{2}) 0.28%
- Elevation: 866 ft (264 m)

Population (2000)
  - Total: 374
  - Density: 7.8/sq mi (3/km^{2})
- GNIS feature ID: 0469020

Wyacondah Township is a township in Davis County, Iowa, United States. As of the 2000 census, its population was 374.

== History ==
Wyacondah Township was organized in 1846.

== Geography ==
Wyacondah Township covers an area of 48.24 square miles (124.95 square kilometers); of this, 0.13 square miles (0.35 square kilometers) or 0.28 percent is water. The streams of Batten Branch and North Fabius Creek run through this township.

=== Unincorporated towns ===
- Lunsford
- Mark
- Savannah

(This list is based on USGS data and may include former settlements.)

=== Adjacent townships ===
- Bloomfield Township (northeast)
- Cleveland Township (northeast)
- Grove Township (east)
- Fabius Township (west)
- West Grove Township (northwest)

=== Cemeteries ===
The township contains thirteen cemeteries: Bragg, Bridwell, Davies, Dooley, Fenton, Howell, Inskeep, Kelley, Morgan, Savannah, Small, Sullivan and Wesley Chapel.

=== Major highways ===
- U.S. Route 63
