= Fox Valley Community School District =

Former school district in Iowa

Fox Valley Community School District was a school district serving Cantril and Milton in Iowa. For a period it had its headquarters in Cantril and operated Cantril Elementary School in Cantril and Fox Valley Jr./Sr. High School in Milton. It later got into a grade-sharing arrangement with Van Buren Community School District in which it sent secondary students to Van Buren Junior/Senior High School in Keosauqua. The former high school closed, and the elementary and district headquarters were in Milton. In November 2003 voters in the Van Buren and Fox Valley districts approved a consolidation. The combined school board was to begin meeting in December 2003 and consolidation was to be effective July 1, 2004.
