= Van Buren County Community School District =

Public school district in Keosauqua, Iowa, United States

Coordinates: 40.731161°N 91.96143°W

Address
- 405 4th St. Keosauqua, Iowa, 52565; United States
- Coordinates: 40.731161, -91.96143

District information
- Type: Public
- Motto: "Warrior pride county wide."
- Grades: K-12
- Established: 2019
- Superintendent: Jeremy Hissem
- Schools: 3
- Budget: $16,048,000 (2020-21)
- NCES District ID: 1928980

Students and staff
- Students: 867 (2022-23)
- Teachers: 71.33 FTE
- Staff: 86.49 FTE
- Student–teacher ratio: 12.15
- Athletic conference: Southeast Iowa Superconference; South Division
- District mascot: Warriors
- Colors: Orange and Black

Other information
- Affiliation(s): (Boys' sports) IHSAA and (Girls' Sports) IGHSAU
- Website: www.van-buren.k12.ia.us

The Van Buren County Community School District (VBCSD) is a rural public school district headquartered in Keosauqua, Iowa.

It is mostly in Van Buren County, and extends into Davis, Henry, and Lee counties. In addition to Keosauqua, it also serves Birmingham, Bonaparte, Cantril, Farmington, Hillsboro, Milton, and Stockport. It also serves two census-designated places in unincorporated Van Buren County: Douds and Leando.

== History ==
It was established on July 1, 2019, by the merger of the Harmony Community School District and the Van Buren Community School District. The predecessor districts had begun a grade-sharing arrangement in which Harmony-zoned students attended Van Buren schools for grades 7–12 in 2016. The state of Iowa had changed its scheme for funding public schools, and the numbers of students in area schools had decreased.

In January 2018, the administrations of the Van Buren and Harmony districts began to consider merging. In February 2018 83% of the voters in the Van Buren and Harmony districts voted to merge, with 94% (of 637 voters) in favor in the pre-merger Van Buren district and 72% (of 619 voters) in favor in the pre-merger Harmony district.

The requirement for a merge was for both districts to each have over 50% of voters in favor.

There was a single superintendent and school board for both areas beginning on July 1, 2019.

== Schools ==
The schools are:

- Van Buren County Community Middle/High School - Keosauqua
- Douds Elementary Attendance Center - unincorporated Van Buren County, adjacent to the Leando CDP
- Harmony Elementary Attendance Center - Unincorporated Van Buren County, near Farmington

== Athletics ==
The Warriors compete in the Southeast Iowa Superconference (South Division), in the following sports:

- Boys' & Girls' Cross country
- Girls' Volleyball
- Boys' & Girls' Wrestling
- Boys' & Girls' Basketball
- Boys' & Girls' Track and field
- Boys' & Girls' Golf
- Boys' Baseball
- Girls' Softball

The Warriors send their athletes to Fort Madison to compete in the Southeast Conference in the following sports:

- Boys' & Girls' Soccer

For American Football, the Warriors compete in Iowa Class A District 5 (As of 2025).

== See also ==
- List of school districts in Iowa
- List of high schools in Iowa
