= Ash Grove, Iowa =

- unincorporated community
- Location within Iowa
- Coordinates: 40°52′15″N 92°33′10″W
- Country: United States
- State: Iowa
- Elevation: 751 ft (229 m)
- Time zone: UTC-6 (Central (CST))
  - Summer (DST): UTC-5 (CDT)
- GNIS feature ID: 454255

Ash Grove is an unincorporated community in Davis County, in the U.S. state of Iowa.

== History ==
The community's population was 45 in 1890, 56 in 1900, and 55 in 1920. The population was 55 in 1940.
