= Cantril, Iowa =

- City
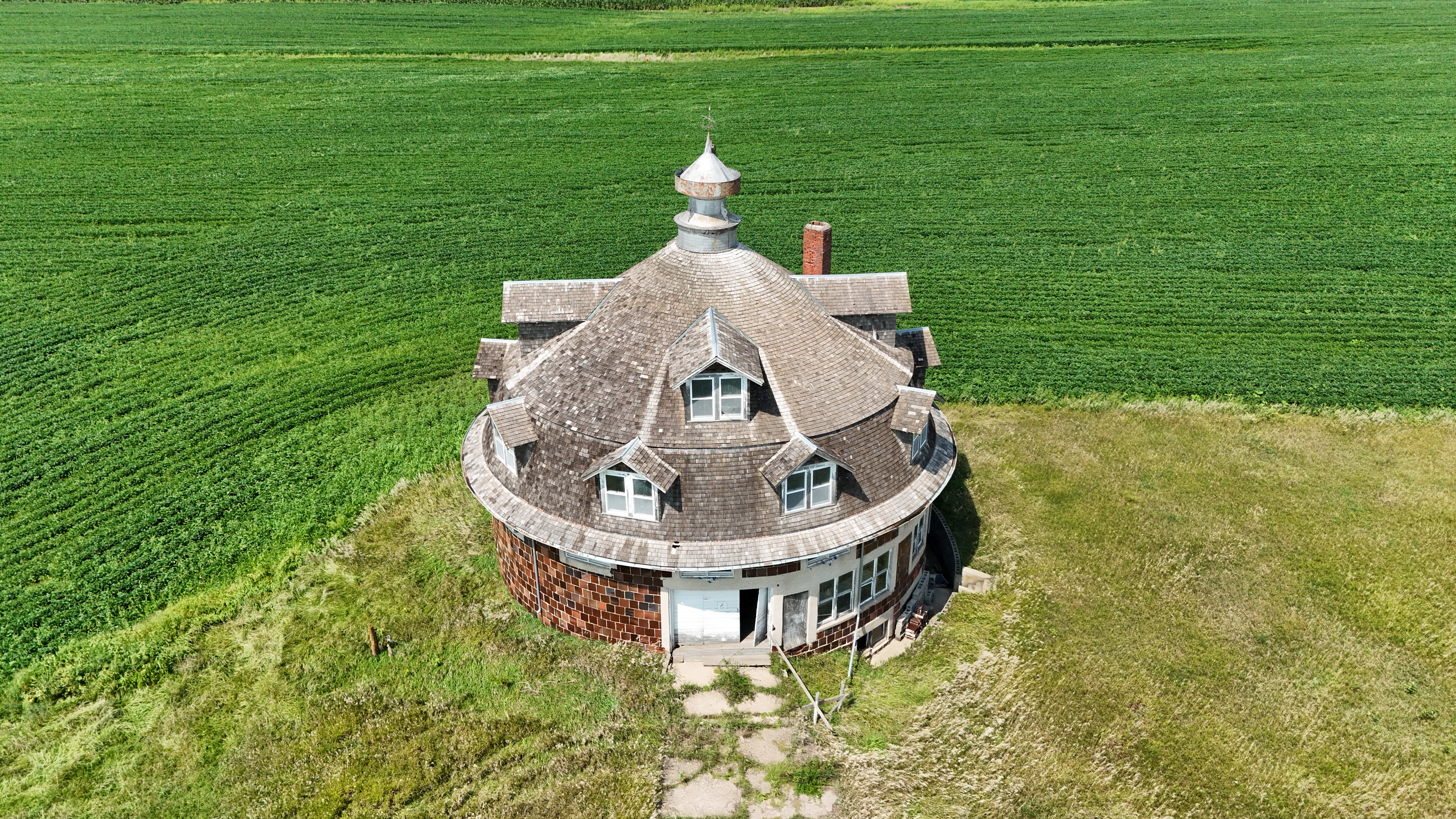
- The Wickfield Round Barn, a landmark near Cantril

- Location of Cantril, Iowa
- Coordinates: 40°38′34″N 92°04′06″W
- Country: United States
- State: Iowa
- County: Van Buren

Area
  - Total: 0.52 sq mi (1.34 km^{2})
  - Land: 0.52 sq mi (1.34 km^{2})
  - Water: 0 sq mi (0.00 km^{2})
- Elevation: 758 ft (231 m)

Population (2020)
  - Total: 224
  - Density: 433.2/sq mi (167.26/km^{2})
- Time zone: UTC-6 (Central (CST))
  - Summer (DST): UTC-5 (CDT)
- ZIP codes: 52542, 52573
- Area code: 319
- FIPS code: 19-10450
- GNIS feature ID: 2393736
- Website: http://cantrilia.com

Cantril is a city in Van Buren County, Iowa, United States. The population was 224 at the 2020 census. Founded in 1871, Cantril is a regional hub of a large Amish and Mennonite community.

== History ==
Cantril was laid out in 1871. Cantril emerged as a railroad depot but has remained a small city with a population under 500. The city has become a regional hub for a sizable Amish and Mennonite community. In 1985, Claire and Virginia Zimmerman had established the Dutchman’s Store, beginning as a small market that evolved into a large old fashioned dry goods, fabric, and grocery store.

== Geography ==
According to the United States Census Bureau, the city has a total area of 0.51 square miles (1.32 km^{2}), all land.

== Demographics ==
Historical populations
Year	Pop.	±%
1880	252	—
1890	356	+41.3%
1900	356	+0.0%
1910	445	+25.0%
1920	440	−1.1%
1930	370	−15.9%
1940	376	+1.6%
1950	353	−6.1%
1960	299	−15.3%
1970	258	−13.7%
1980	299	+15.9%
1990	271	−9.4%
2000	257	−5.2%
2010	222	−13.6%
2020	224	+0.9%
Source:"U.S. Census website". United States Census Bureau. and Iowa Data Center; Source: U.S. Decennial Census

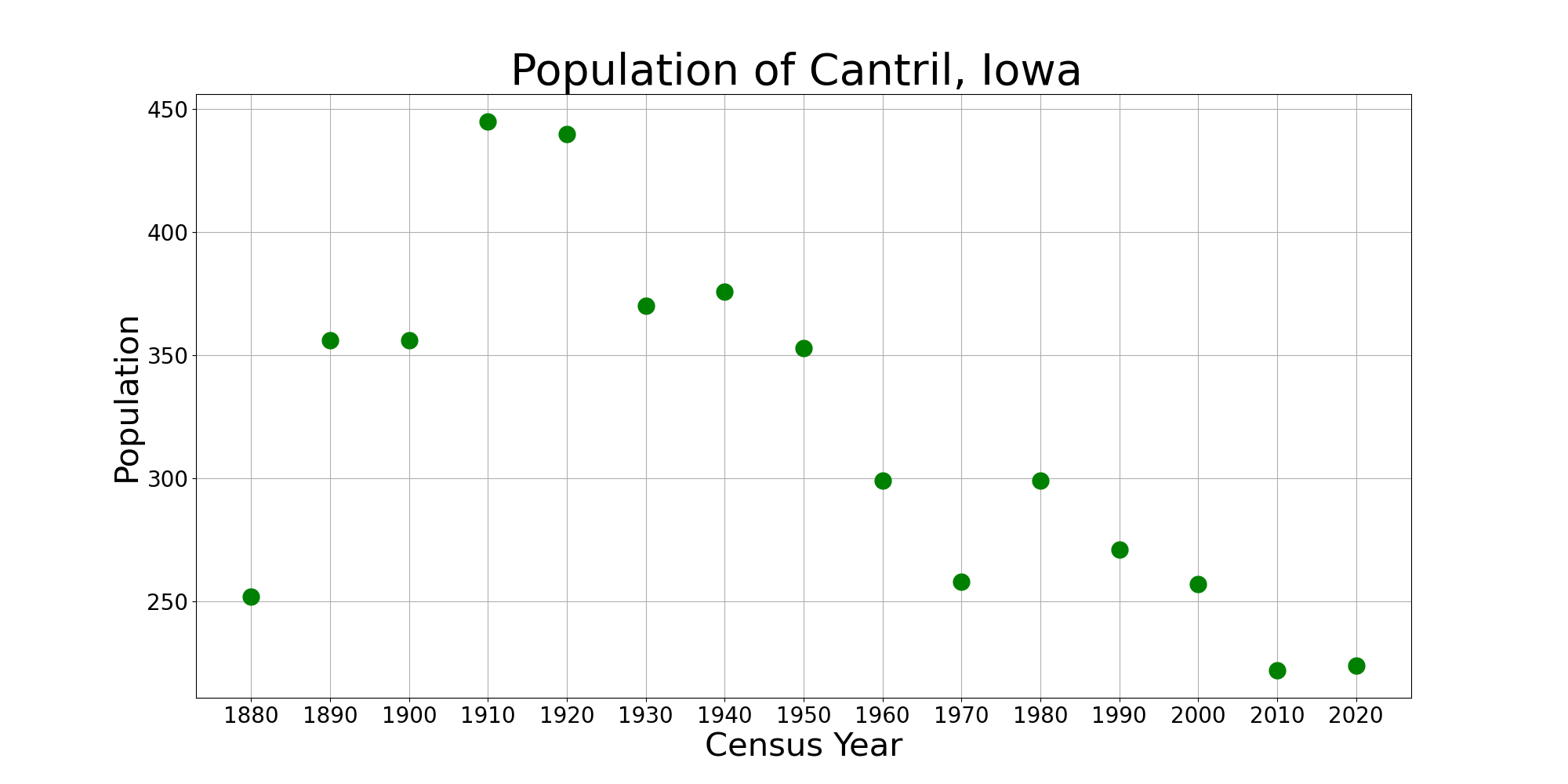
The population of Cantril, Iowa from US census data

=== 2020 census ===
As of the census of 2020, there were 224 people, 97 households, and 69 families residing in the city. The population density was 433.2 inhabitants per square mile (167.3/km^{2}). There were 117 housing units at an average density of 226.3 per square mile (87.4/km^{2}). The racial makeup of the city was 97.8% White, 0.0% Black or African American, 0.0% Native American, 1.3% Asian, 0.0% Pacific Islander, 0.0% from other races and 0.9% from two or more races. Hispanic or Latino persons of any race comprised 0.9% of the population.

Of the 97 households, 29.9% of which had children under the age of 18 living with them, 53.6% were married couples living together, 7.2% were cohabitating couples, 15.5% had a female householder with no spouse or partner present and 23.7% had a male householder with no spouse or partner present. 28.9% of all households were non-families. 26.8% of all households were made up of individuals, 15.5% had someone living alone who was 65 years old or older.

The median age in the city was 41.0 years. 27.2% of the residents were under the age of 20; 8.0% were between the ages of 20 and 24; 17.9% were from 25 and 44; 18.3% were from 45 and 64; and 28.6% were 65 years of age or older. The gender makeup of the city was 52.7% male and 47.3% female.

=== 2010 census ===
As of the census of 2010, there were 222 people, 104 households, and 59 families residing in the city. The population density was 435.3 inhabitants per square mile (168.1/km^{2}). There were 118 housing units at an average density of 231.4 per square mile (89.3/km^{2}). The racial makeup of the city was 98.6% White, 0.5% Asian, 0.5% Pacific Islander, and 0.5% from other races. Hispanic or Latino of any race were 0.5% of the population.

There were 104 households, of which 22.1% had children under the age of 18 living with them, 45.2% were married couples living together, 6.7% had a female householder with no husband present, 4.8% had a male householder with no wife present, and 43.3% were non-families. 40.4% of all households were made up of individuals, and 25% had someone living alone who was 65 years of age or older. The average household size was 2.13 and the average family size was 2.92.

The median age in the city was 49 years. 21.6% of residents were under the age of 18; 5.5% were between the ages of 18 and 24; 19.9% were from 25 to 44; 26.2% were from 45 to 64; and 27% were 65 years of age or older. The gender makeup of the city was 51.4% male and 48.6% female.

=== 2000 census ===
As of the census of 2000, there were 257 people, 112 households, and 71 families residing in the city. The population density was 507.5 inhabitants per square mile (195.9/km^{2}). There were 119 housing units at an average density of 235.0 per square mile (90.7/km^{2}). The racial makeup of the city was 96.89% White, 0.39% African American, 0.78% Native American, 0.78% Asian, 0.39% from other races, and 0.78% from two or more races. Hispanic or Latino of any race were 0.39% of the population.

There were 112 households, out of which 25.9% had children under the age of 18 living with them, 52.7% were married couples living together, 6.3% had a female householder with no husband present, and 36.6% were non-families. 32.1% of all households were made up of individuals, and 23.2% had someone living alone who was 65 years of age or older. The average household size was 2.29 and the average family size was 2.90.

In the city, the population was spread out, with 24.5% under the age of 18, 8.2% from 18 to 24, 20.6% from 25 to 44, 23.7% from 45 to 64, and 23.0% who were 65 years of age or older. The median age was 41 years. For every 100 females, there were 112.4 males. For every 100 females age 18 and over, there were 96.0 males.

The median income for a household in the city was $22,917, and the median income for a family was $25,625. Males had a median income of $27,778 versus $19,000 for females. The per capita income for the city was $12,488. About 21.7% of families and 22.0% of the population were below the poverty line, including 35.7% of those under the age of eighteen and 17.5% of those 65 or over.

== Education ==
The community is served by the Van Buren County Community School District.

Cantril was previously in the Fox Valley Community School District. Initially the district had two schools: Cantril Elementary School in Cantril and Fox Valley Jr./Sr. High School in Milton, although after Fox Valley grade-sharing arrangement with Van Buren Schools in which it sent secondary students to Van Buren Junior/Senior High School in Keosauqua, the former high school closed, and the elementary and district headquarters moved to Milton. The Fox Valley school district consolidated into the Van Buren Community School District effective July 1, 2004. That district in turn merged into Van Buren County CSD on July 1, 2019.
