= Stockport, Iowa =

- City
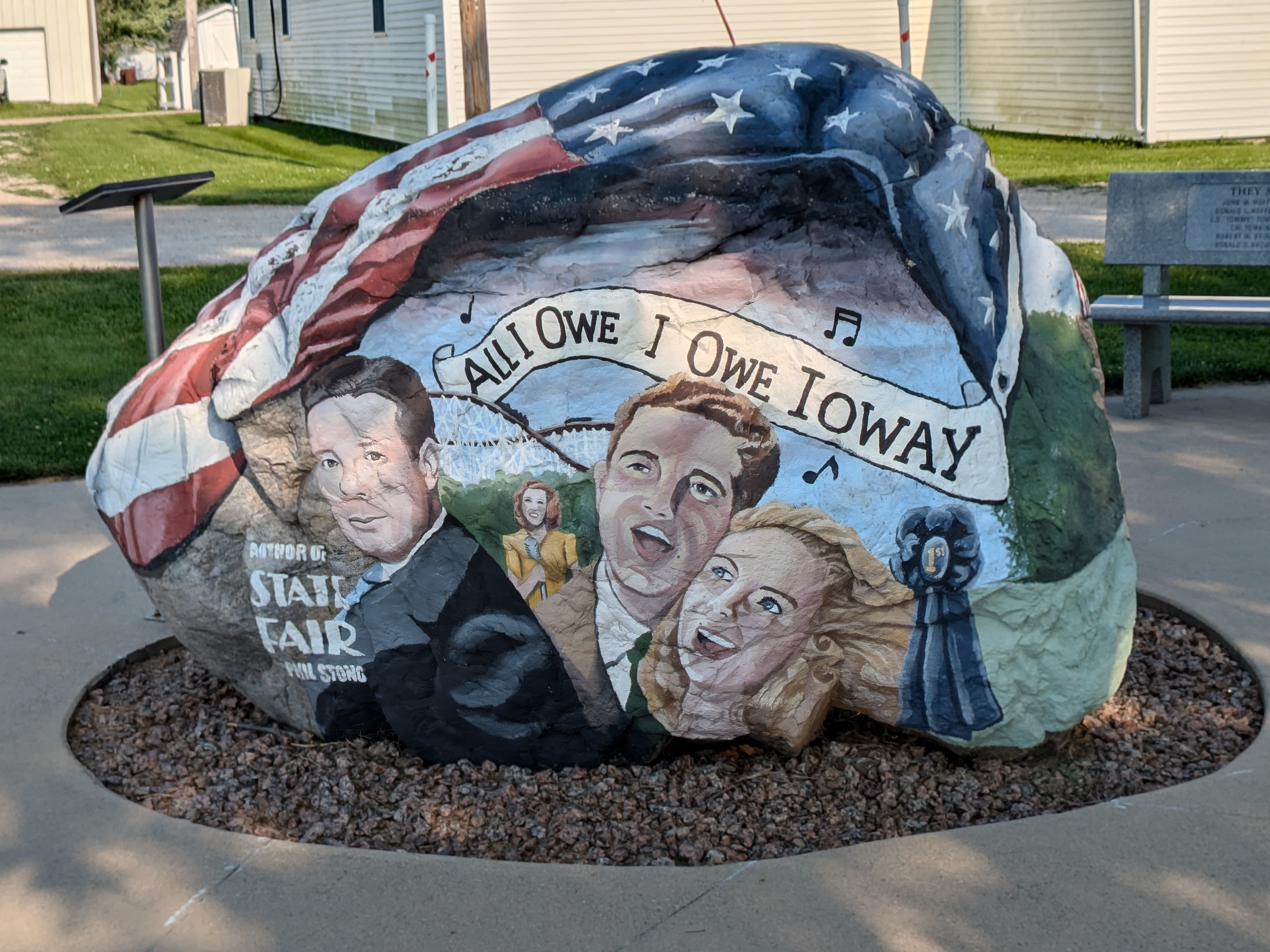
- Van Buren County Freedom Rock in Stockport

- Location of Stockport, Iowa
- Coordinates: 40°51′26″N 91°50′00″W
- Country: United States
- State: Iowa
- County: Van Buren
- Incorporated: January 9, 1903

Area
  - Total: 1.03 sq mi (2.66 km^{2})
  - Land: 1.03 sq mi (2.66 km^{2})
  - Water: 0 sq mi (0.00 km^{2})
- Elevation: 755 ft (230 m)

Population (2020)
  - Total: 272
  - Density: 264.9/sq mi (102.26/km^{2})
- Time zone: UTC-6 (Central (CST))
  - Summer (DST): UTC-5 (CDT)
- ZIP code: 52651
- Area code: 319
- FIPS code: 19-75405
- GNIS feature ID: 2395970
- Website: www.cityofstockport.com

Stockport is a city in Van Buren County, Iowa, United States. The population was 272 at the time of the 2020 census.

== Geography ==
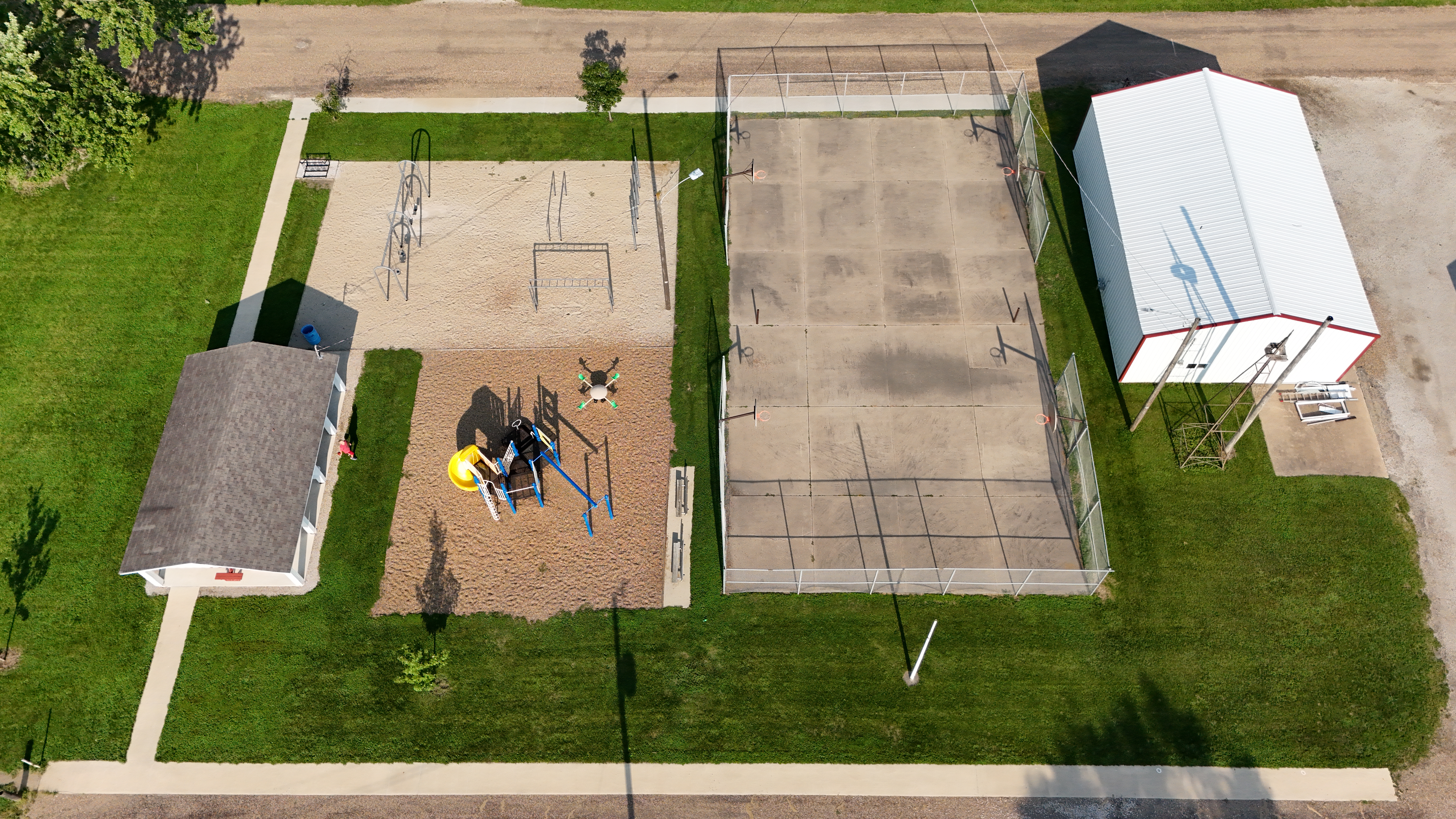
A city park in Stockport

According to the United States Census Bureau, the city has a total area of 1.03 square miles (2.67 km^{2}), all land.

== Demographics ==
Historical populations
Year	Pop.	±%
1910	265	—
1920	385	+45.3%
1930	322	−16.4%
1940	338	+5.0%
1950	346	+2.4%
1960	342	−1.2%
1970	334	−2.3%
1980	272	−18.6%
1990	260	−4.4%
2000	284	+9.2%
2010	296	+4.2%
2020	272	−8.1%
Source:"U.S. Census website". United States Census Bureau. and Iowa Data Center; Source: U.S. Decennial Census

=== 2020 census ===
As of the census of 2020, there were 272 people, 107 households, and 65 families residing in the city. The population density was 264.9 inhabitants per square mile (102.3/km^{2}). There were 121 housing units at an average density of 117.8 per square mile (45.5/km^{2}). The racial makeup of the city was 90.8% White, 2.9% Black or African American, 1.1% Native American, 0.0% Asian, 0.0% Pacific Islander, 0.4% from other races and 4.8% from two or more races. Hispanic or Latino persons of any race comprised 0.7% of the population.

Of the 107 households, 36.4% of which had children under the age of 18 living with them, 40.2% were married couples living together, 11.2% were cohabitating couples, 30.8% had a female householder with no spouse or partner present and 17.8% had a male householder with no spouse or partner present. 39.3% of all households were non-families. 32.7% of all households were made up of individuals, 12.1% had someone living alone who was 65 years old or older.

The median age in the city was 34.8 years. 29.4% of the residents were under the age of 20; 8.1% were between the ages of 20 and 24; 24.6% were from 25 and 44; 21.7% were from 45 and 64; and 16.2% were 65 years of age or older. The gender makeup of the city was 51.1% male and 48.9% female.

=== 2010 census ===
As of the census of 2010, there were 296 people, 112 households, and 76 families living in the city. The population density was 287.4 inhabitants per square mile (111.0/km^{2}). There were 127 housing units at an average density of 123.3 per square mile (47.6/km^{2}). The racial makeup of the city was 97.0% White, 0.3% Native American, 1.0% Asian, and 1.7% from two or more races. Hispanic or Latino of any race were 0.3% of the population.

There were 112 households, of which 38.4% had children under the age of 18 living with them, 56.3% were married couples living together, 6.3% had a female householder with no husband present, 5.4% had a male householder with no wife present, and 32.1% were non-families. 26.8% of all households were made up of individuals, and 13.4% had someone living alone who was 65 years of age or older. The average household size was 2.64 and the average family size was 3.29.

The median age in the city was 33.8 years. 31.1% of residents were under the age of 18; 8.8% were between the ages of 18 and 24; 28.7% were from 25 to 44; 19.3% were from 45 to 64; and 12.2% were 65 years of age or older. The gender makeup of the city was 50.7% male and 49.3% female.

=== 2000 census ===
As of the census of 2000, there were 284 people, 120 households, and 71 families living in the city. The population density was 276.4 inhabitants per square mile (106.7/km^{2}). There were 133 housing units at an average density of 129.4 per square mile (50.0/km^{2}). The racial makeup of the city was 95.77% White, 0.35% Native American, 3.17% from other races, and 0.70% from two or more races. Hispanic or Latino of any race were 3.52% of the population.

There were 120 households, out of which 30.0% had children under the age of 18 living with them, 49.2% were married couples living together, 4.2% had a female householder with no husband present, and 40.8% were non-families. 35.0% of all households were made up of individuals, and 20.8% had someone living alone who was 65 years of age or older. The average household size was 2.37 and the average family size was 3.13.

In the city, the population was spread out, with 27.1% under the age of 18, 9.2% from 18 to 24, 26.4% from 25 to 44, 21.5% from 45 to 64, and 15.8% who were 65 years of age or older. The median age was 33 years. For every 100 females, there were 113.5 males. For every 100 females age 18 and over, there were 120.2 males.

The median income for a household in the city was $28,438, and the median income for a family was $31,563. Males had a median income of $28,375 versus $19,750 for females. The per capita income for the city was $13,389. About 8.3% of families and 10.2% of the population were below the poverty line, including 10.1% of those under the age of eighteen and 20.6% of those 65 or over.

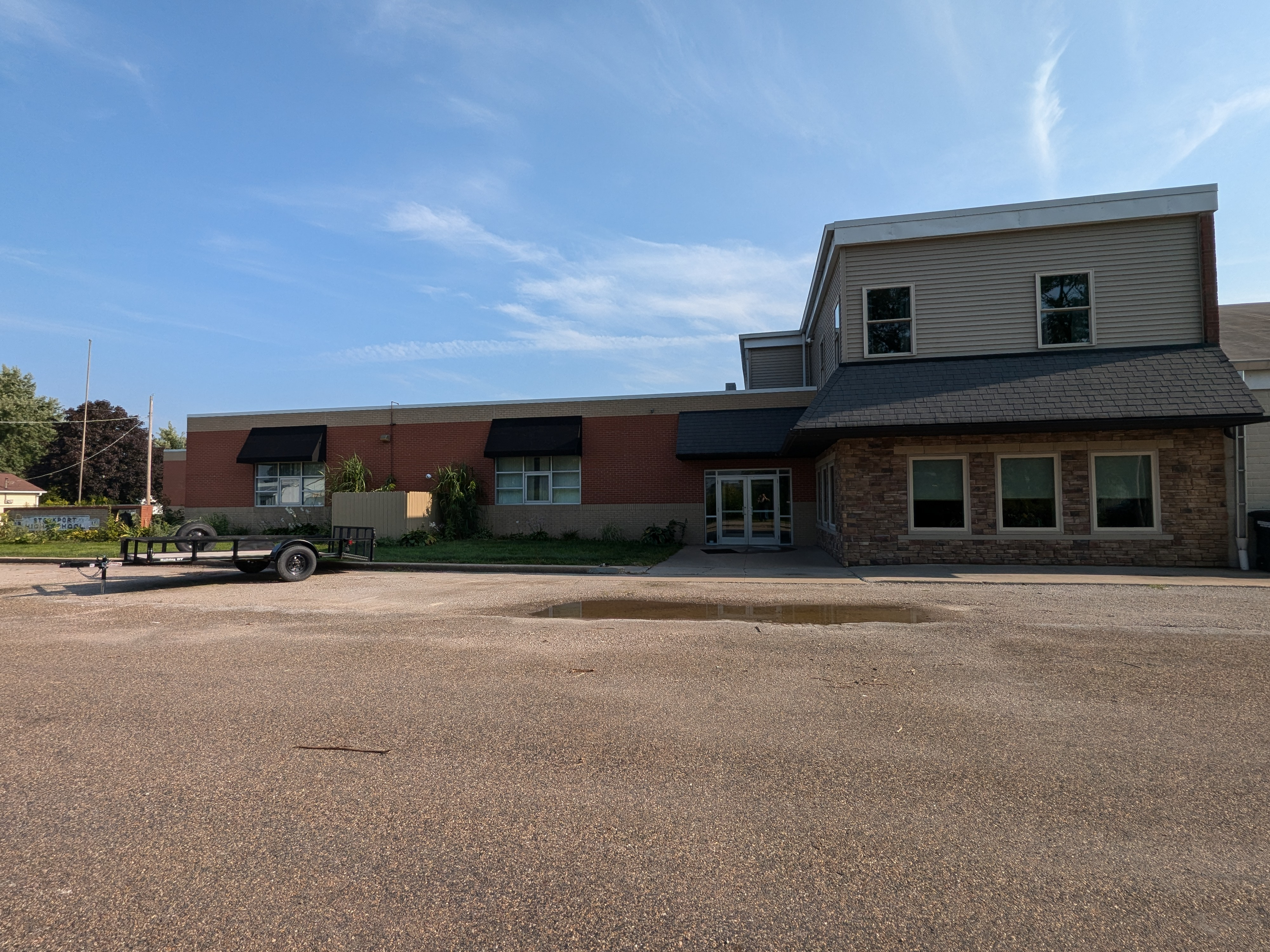
Stockport High School

== Education ==
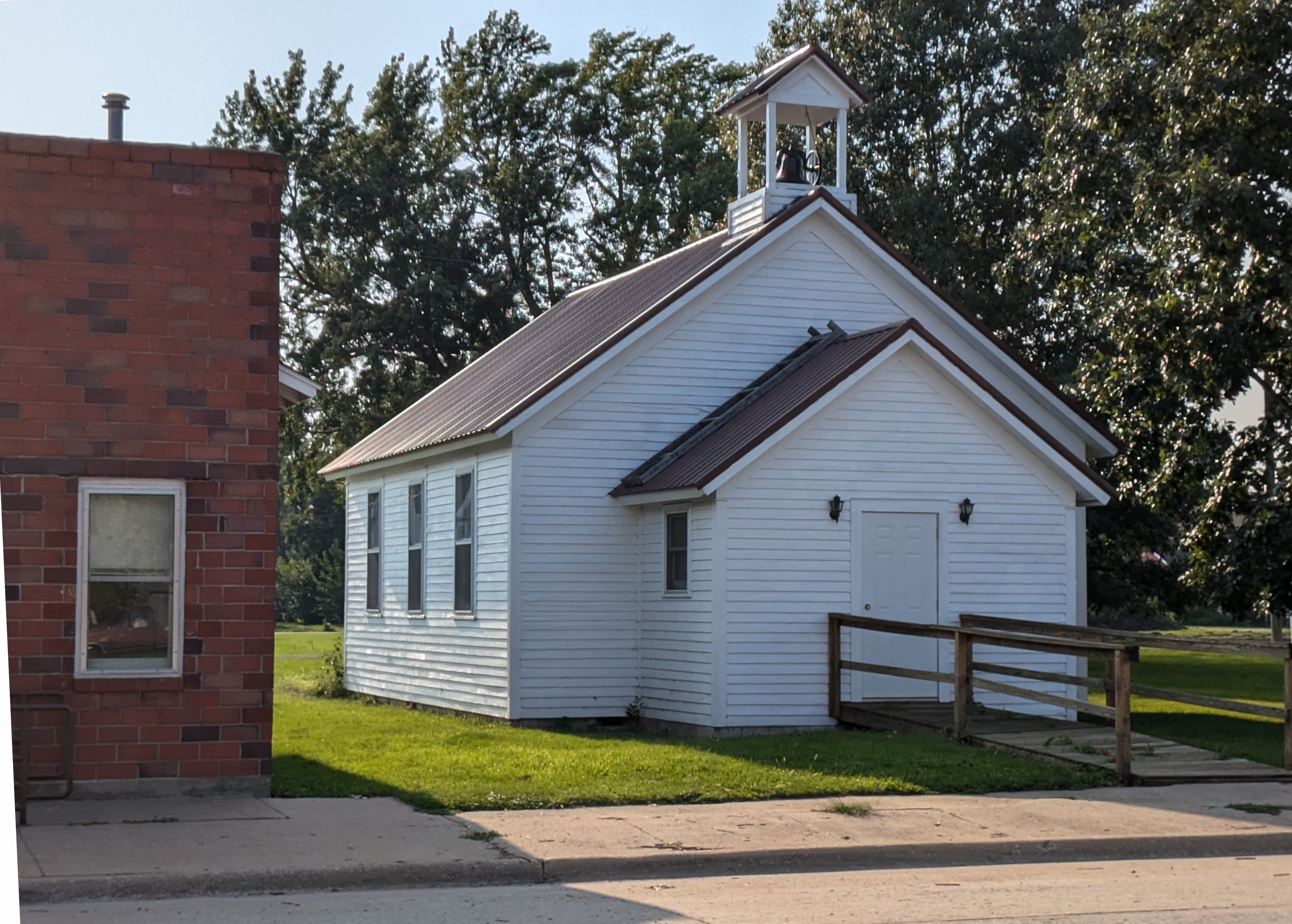
Stockport old schoolhouse

The community is served by the Van Buren County Community School District. It was previously in the Van Buren Community School District, until it merged into Van Buren County CSD on July 1, 2019.

The former Van Buren CSD operated Stockport Elementary School in the late 1990s. There was a middle school in Stockport, but in 2011 Van Buren CSD school board chose to close that building and move the middle school to Keosauqua. The vote was a 4-2 basis, and done to reduce expenses.
