= Belknap, Iowa =

- Unincorporated community
- Location within Iowa
- Coordinates: 40°49′14″N 92°25′35″W
- Country: United States
- State: Iowa
- County: Davis
- Elevation: 863 ft (263 m)
- Time zone: UTC-6 (Central (CST))
  - Summer (DST): UTC-5 (CDT)
- Area code: 712
- GNIS feature ID: 454489

Belknap is an unincorporated community in Davis County, in the U.S. state of Iowa.

== History ==
The community's population was 150 in 1890, 146 in 1900, and 115 in 1920. The population was 100 in 1940.
