= Milton, Iowa =

- Town
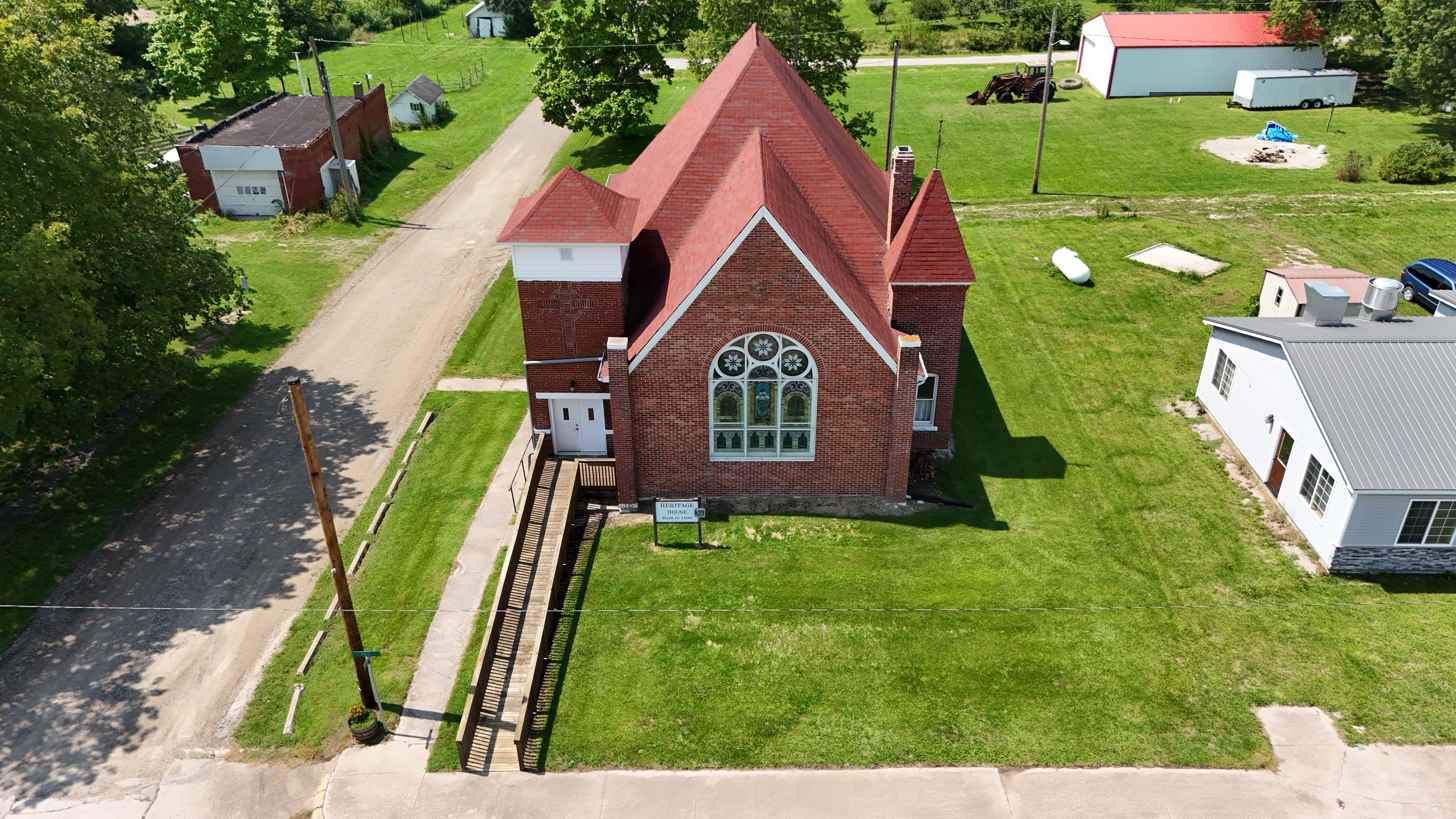
- The Milton Heritage House, built in 1898

- Location of Milton, Iowa
- Coordinates: 40°40′18″N 92°09′43″W
- Country: USA
- State: Iowa
- County: Van Buren

Area
  - Total: 2.69 sq mi (6.97 km^{2})
  - Land: 2.69 sq mi (6.97 km^{2})
  - Water: 0 sq mi (0.00 km^{2})
- Elevation: 781 ft (238 m)

Population (2020)
  - Total: 380
  - Density: 141.1/sq mi (54.49/km^{2})
- Time zone: UTC-6 (Central (CST))
  - Summer (DST): UTC-5 (CDT)
- ZIP code: 52570
- Area code: 641
- FIPS code: 19-52500
- GNIS feature ID: 2395335

Milton is a city in Van Buren County, Iowa, United States. The population was 380 at the time of the 2020 census.

== History ==
Milton was laid out in 1851. In 1872, Milton experienced growth when the Burlington and Southwestern Railway was built through it. The town was founded by settlers from Milton, Delaware.

== Geography ==
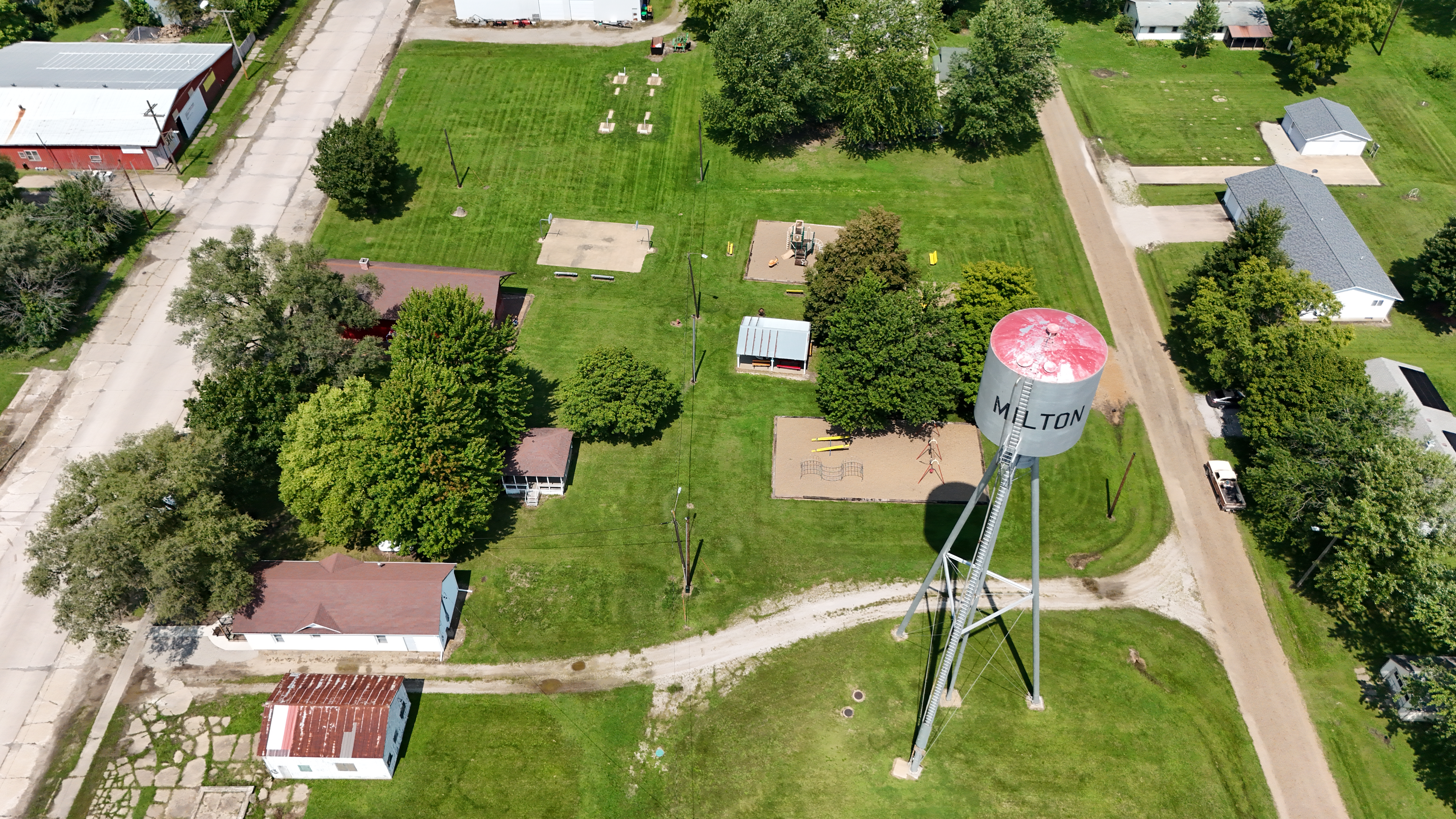
The Milton city park

According to the United States Census Bureau, the city has a total area of 2.51 square miles (6.50 km^{2}), all land.

== Demographics ==
Historical populations
Year	Pop.	±%
1880	412	—
1890	643	+56.1%
1900	849	+32.0%
1910	913	+7.5%
1920	845	−7.4%
1930	771	−8.8%
1940	809	+4.9%
1950	719	−11.1%
1960	609	−15.3%
1970	567	−6.9%
1980	567	+0.0%
1990	506	−10.8%
2000	550	+8.7%
2010	443	−19.5%
2020	380	−14.2%
Source:"U.S. Census website". United States Census Bureau. and Iowa Data Center; Source: U.S. Decennial Census

=== 2020 census ===
As of the census of 2020, there were 380 people, 159 households, and 112 families residing in the city. The population density was 141.1 inhabitants per square mile (54.5/km^{2}). There were 184 housing units at an average density of 68.3 per square mile (26.4/km^{2}). The racial makeup of the city was 96.6% White, 0.8% Black or African American, 0.0% Native American, 0.5% Asian, 0.0% Pacific Islander, 0.0% from other races and 2.1% from two or more races. Hispanic or Latino persons of any race comprised 1.6% of the population.

Of the 159 households, 38.4% of which had children under the age of 18 living with them, 54.7% were married couples living together, 6.3% were cohabitating couples, 20.8% had a female householder with no spouse or partner present and 18.2% had a male householder with no spouse or partner present. 29.6% of all households were non-families. 25.8% of all households were made up of individuals, 13.8% had someone living alone who was 65 years old or older.

The median age in the city was 38.0 years. 27.1% of the residents were under the age of 20; 9.7% were between the ages of 20 and 24; 21.3% were from 25 and 44; 25.0% were from 45 and 64; and 16.8% were 65 years of age or older. The gender makeup of the city was 51.6% male and 48.4% female.

=== 2010 census ===
As of the census of 2010, there were 443 people, 169 households, and 114 families living in the city. The population density was 176.5 inhabitants per square mile (68.1/km^{2}). There were 204 housing units at an average density of 81.3 per square mile (31.4/km^{2}). The racial makeup of the city was 98.2% White, 0.2% African American, 0.2% Asian, and 1.4% from two or more races. Hispanic or Latino of any race were 2.9% of the population.

There were 169 households, of which 30.2% had children under the age of 18 living with them, 51.5% were married couples living together, 10.1% had a female householder with no husband present, 5.9% had a male householder with no wife present, and 32.5% were non-families. 29.6% of all households were made up of individuals, and 14.8% had someone living alone who was 65 years of age or older. The average household size was 2.62 and the average family size was 3.25.

The median age in the city was 34.1 years. 30.2% of residents were under the age of 18; 7.6% were between the ages of 18 and 24; 22.8% were from 25 to 44; 23.9% were from 45 to 64; and 15.6% were 65 years of age or older. The gender makeup of the city was 52.1% male and 47.9% female.

=== 2000 census ===
As of the census of 2000, there were 550 people, 216 households, and 149 families living in the city. The population density was 219.6 inhabitants per square mile (84.8/km^{2}). There were 243 housing units at an average density of 97.0 per square mile (37.5/km^{2}). The racial makeup of the city was 97.27% White, 0.18% African American, 0.55% Native American, 0.36% Pacific Islander, and 1.64% from two or more races. Hispanic or Latino of any race were 2.18% of the population.

There were 216 households, out of which 29.6% had children under the age of 18 living with them, 58.3% were married couples living together, 7.9% had a female householder with no husband present, and 30.6% were non-families. 26.4% of all households were made up of individuals, and 17.6% had someone living alone who was 65 years of age or older. The average household size was 2.55 and the average family size was 3.06.

In the city, the population was spread out, with 28.5% under the age of 18, 8.9% from 18 to 24, 22.7% from 25 to 44, 17.6% from 45 to 64, and 22.2% who were 65 years of age or older. The median age was 38 years. For every 100 females, there were 107.5 males. For every 100 females age 18 and over, there were 104.7 males.

The median income for a household in the city was $25,938, and the median income for a family was $32,708. Males had a median income of $25,735 versus $16,786 for females. The per capita income for the city was $12,696. About 8.0% of families and 12.0% of the population were below the poverty line, including 17.2% of those under age 18 and 6.8% of those age 65 or over.

== Education ==
The community is served by the Van Buren County Community School District.

Milton was previously in the Fox Valley Community School District. Initially the district had two schools: Cantril Elementary School in Cantril and Fox Valley Jr./Sr. High School in Milton, although after Fox Valley grade-sharing arrangement with Wayne Schools in which it sent secondary students to Van Buren Junior/Senior High School in Keosauqua, the former high school closed, and the elementary and district headquarters moved to Milton. The Fox Valley school district consolidated into the Van Buren Community School District effective July 1, 2004. That district in turn merged into Van Buren County CSD on July 1, 2019.
