= Drakesville, Iowa =

- City
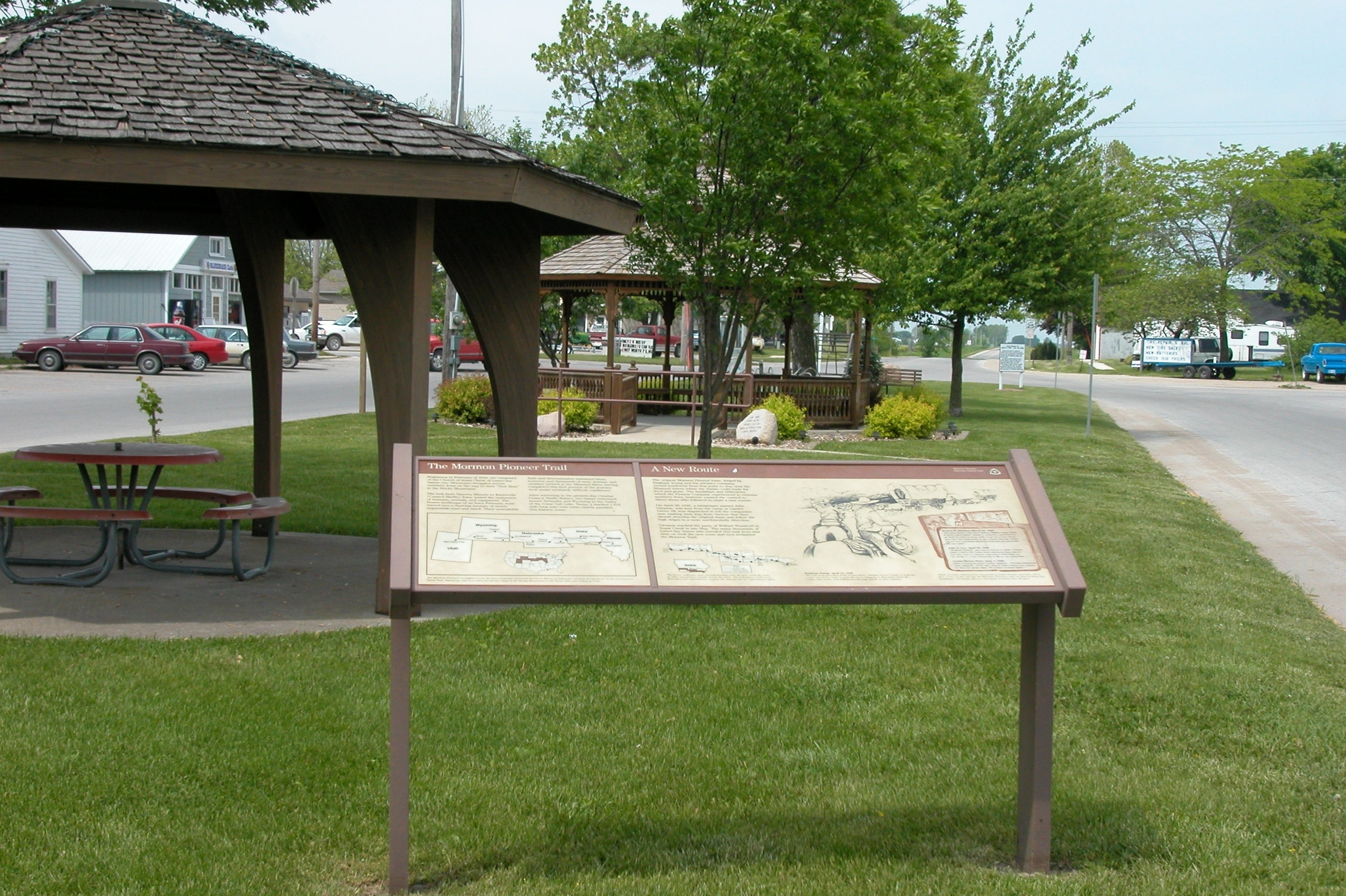
- Drakesville Park

- Location of Drakesville, Iowa
- Coordinates: 40°47′55″N 92°28′53″W
- Country: USA
- State: Iowa
- County: Davis

Area
  - Total: 0.24 sq mi (0.63 km^{2})
  - Land: 0.24 sq mi (0.63 km^{2})
  - Water: 0 sq mi (0.00 km^{2})
- Elevation: 889 ft (271 m)

Population (2020)
  - Total: 164
  - Density: 671.6/sq mi (259.31/km^{2})
- Time zone: UTC-6 (Central (CST))
  - Summer (DST): UTC-5 (CDT)
- ZIP code: 52552
- Area code: 641
- FIPS code: 19-22350
- GNIS feature ID: 2394561

Drakesville is a city in Davis County, Iowa, United States. The population was 164 at the time of the 2020 census.

== History ==
Drakesville (historically Drakeville) was founded in 1847. It was named for its founder, John A. Drake.

== Geography ==
According to the United States Census Bureau, the city has a total area of 0.25 square miles (0.65 km^{2}), all land.

== Demographics ==
Historical populations
Year	Pop.	±%
1850	198	—
1870	207	+4.5%
1880	300	+44.9%
1890	303	+1.0%
1900	238	−21.5%
1910	249	+4.6%
1920	261	+4.8%
1930	190	−27.2%
1940	252	+32.6%
1950	222	−11.9%
1960	197	−11.3%
1970	163	−17.3%
1980	212	+30.1%
1990	172	−18.9%
2000	185	+7.6%
2010	184	−0.5%
2020	164	−10.9%
Source:"U.S. Census website". United States Census Bureau. and Iowa Data Center; Source: U.S. Decennial Census

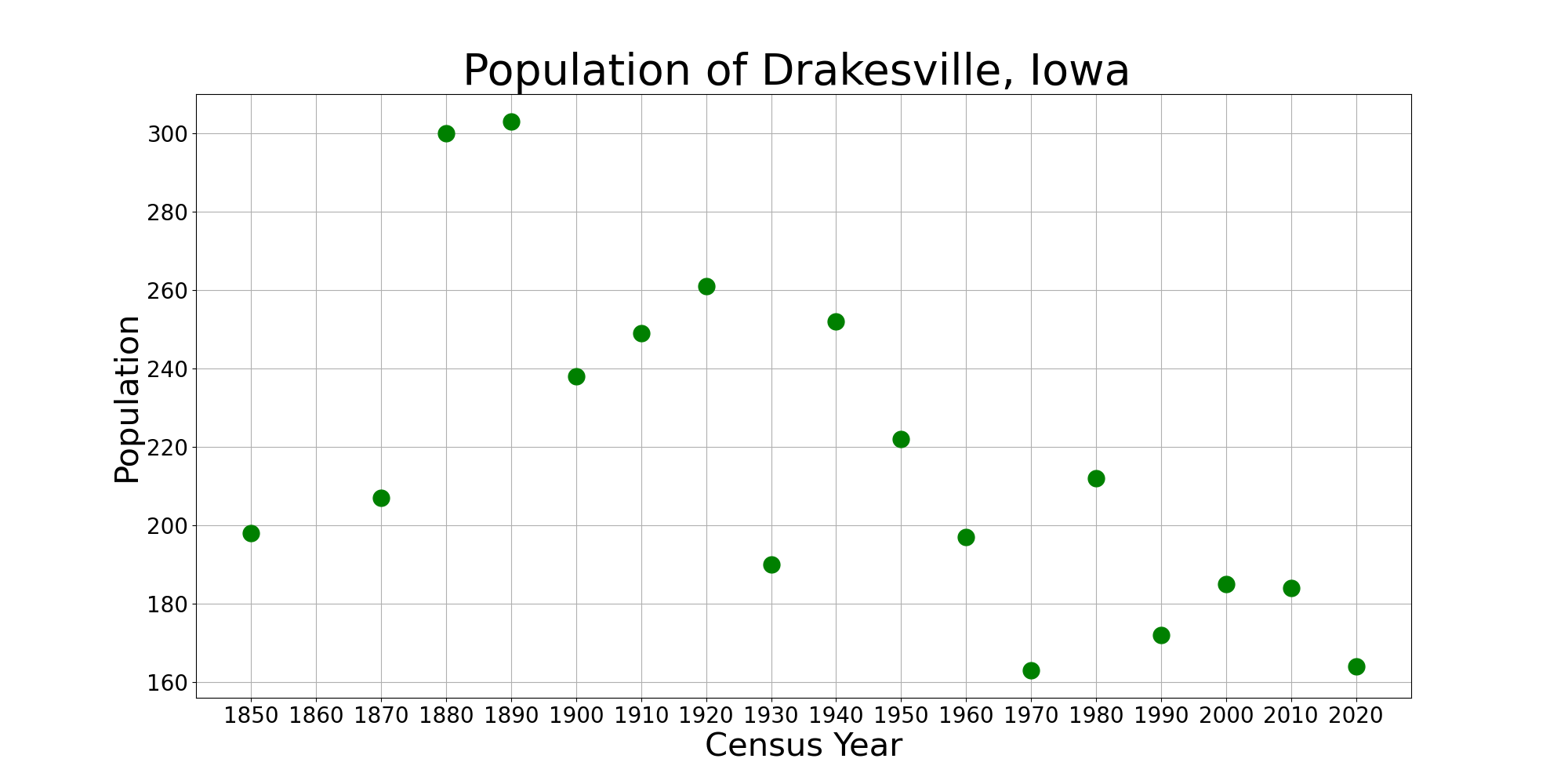
The population of Drakesville, Iowa from US census data

Drakesville is located in the center of Iowa's fastest growing Amish community http://www.iowaamish.com

=== 2020 census ===
As of the census of 2020, there were 164 people, 65 households, and 42 families residing in the city. The population density was 671.6 inhabitants per square mile (259.3/km^{2}). There were 78 housing units at an average density of 319.4 per square mile (123.3/km^{2}). The racial makeup of the city was 96.3% White, 0.0% Black or African American, 0.0% Native American, 0.0% Asian, 0.0% Pacific Islander, 0.0% from other races and 3.7% from two or more races. Hispanic or Latino persons of any race comprised 0.6% of the population.

Of the 65 households, 29.2% of which had children under the age of 18 living with them, 44.6% were married couples living together, 3.1% were cohabitating couples, 29.2% had a female householder with no spouse or partner present and 23.1% had a male householder with no spouse or partner present. 35.4% of all households were non-families. 27.7% of all households were made up of individuals, 10.8% had someone living alone who was 65 years old or older.

The median age in the city was 41.7 years. 23.2% of the residents were under the age of 20; 1.2% were between the ages of 20 and 24; 31.1% were from 25 and 44; 21.3% were from 45 and 64; and 23.2% were 65 years of age or older. The gender makeup of the city was 53.0% male and 47.0% female.

=== 2010 census ===
As of the census of 2010, there were 184 people, 76 households, and 47 families living in the city. The population density was 736.0 inhabitants per square mile (284.2/km^{2}). There were 85 housing units at an average density of 340.0 per square mile (131.3/km^{2}). The racial makeup of the city was 99.5% White and 0.5% from two or more races. Hispanic or Latino of any race were 0.5% of the population.

There were 76 households, of which 25.0% had children under the age of 18 living with them, 50.0% were married couples living together, 10.5% had a female householder with no husband present, 1.3% had a male householder with no wife present, and 38.2% were non-families. 27.6% of all households were made up of individuals, and 11.8% had someone living alone who was 65 years of age or older. The average household size was 2.42 and the average family size was 3.06.

The median age in the city was 41 years. 25.5% of residents were under the age of 18; 9.8% were between the ages of 18 and 24; 19% were from 25 to 44; 27.2% were from 45 to 64; and 18.5% were 65 years of age or older. The gender makeup of the city was 42.4% male and 57.6% female.

=== 2000 census ===
At the 2000 census, there were 185 people, 78 households and 46 families living in the city. The population density was 746.4 inhabitants per square mile (288.2/km^{2}). There were 88 housing units at an average density of 355.0 per square mile (137.1/km^{2}). The racial makeup of the city was 96.22% White, 0.54% African American, and 3.24% from two or more races. Hispanic or Latino of any race were 2.70% of the population.

There were 78 households, of which 30.8% had children under the age of 18 living with them, 51.3% were married couples living together, 5.1% had a female householder with no husband present, and 41.0% were non-families. 33.3% of all households were made up of individuals, and 19.2% had someone living alone who was 65 years of age or older. The average household size was 2.37 and the average family size was 3.15.

Age distribution was 26.5% under the age of 18, 7.0% from 18 to 24, 28.6% from 25 to 44, 20.0% from 45 to 64, and 17.8% who were 65 years of age or older. The median age was 40 years. For every 100 females, there were 88.8 males. For every 100 females age 18 and over, there were 81.3 males.

The median household income was $26,875, and the median family income was $32,500. Males had a median income of $25,625 versus $23,438 for females. The per capita income for the city was $13,063. About 14.7% of families and 11.6% of the population were below the poverty line, including 2.6% of those under the age of eighteen and 26.9% of those 65 or over.

== Education ==
The Davis County Community School District operates local area public schools.
