= Coatsville, Missouri =

Unincorporated community in Schuyler County, Missouri, United States

Coatsville
- Unincorporated Community
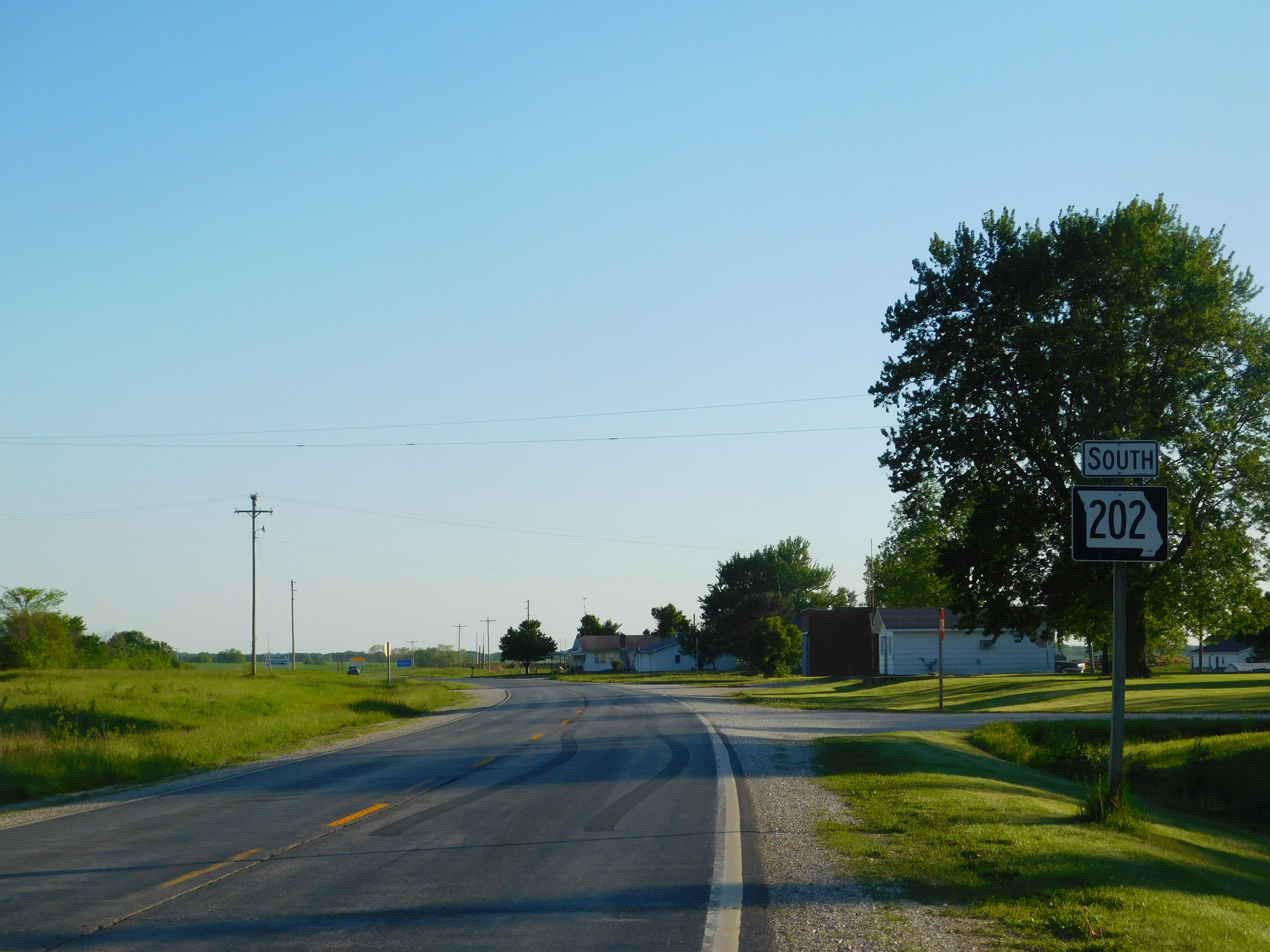
- Route 202 in Coatsville, May 2017
- Interactive map of Coatsville
- Coordinates: 40°35′21″N 92°38′01″W
- Country: United States
- State: Missouri
- County: Schuyler
- Elevation: 991 ft (302 m)
- Time zone: UTC−06:00 (Central)
  - Summer (DST): UTC−05:00 (CDT)
- ZIP Code: 63535
- GNIS feature ID: 396209

Coatsville is an unincorporated community in northern Schuyler County, Missouri, United States.

According to the United States Geological Survey, Coatsville is the northernmost town in Missouri.

== Description ==
The community is located on Missouri Route 202, approximately 6-mile (9.7 km) miles northwest of Lancaster on the Iowa state line. The community is part of the Kirksville micropolitan area.

Coatsville was platted in 1869. A post office called Coatsville has been in operation since 1869.
