= Wells Township, Appanoose County, Iowa =

Township in Iowa, US

Wells Township, Appanoose County
- Township
- Coordinates: 40°38′22″N 092°41′47″W
- Country: United States
- State: Iowa
- County: Appanoose

Area
  - Total: 38.51 sq mi (99.73 km^{2})
  - Land: 38.42 sq mi (99.50 km^{2})
  - Water: 0.089 sq mi (0.23 km^{2})
- Elevation: 876 ft (267 m)

Population (2010)
  - Total: 270
  - Density: 7.0/sq mi (2.7/km^{2})
- ZIP code: 52572
- Area code: 641
- FIPS code: 19-94638
- GNIS feature ID: 0468967

Wells Township is one of seventeen townships in Appanoose County, Iowa, United States. As of the 2010 census, its population was 270.

== History ==
Wells Township was founded in 1848.

== Geography ==
Wells Township covers an area of 38.5 square miles (99.7 km^{2}) and contains no incorporated settlements. According to the USGS, it contains five cemeteries: Croft, Davis, Hilltown, Kerby and Staten. The former village of Hilltown was located in this township.
