= Washington Township, Appanoose County, Iowa =

Township in Iowa, US

Washington Township, Appanoose County
- Township
- Coordinates: 40°43′48″N 092°42′01″W
- Country: United States
- State: Iowa
- County: Appanoose

Area
  - Total: 36.11 sq mi (93.53 km^{2})
  - Land: 36.04 sq mi (93.35 km^{2})
  - Water: 0.069 sq mi (0.18 km^{2})
- Elevation: 981 ft (299 m)

Population (2010)
  - Total: 722
  - Density: 20/sq mi (7.7/km^{2})
- FIPS code: 19-94449
- GNIS feature ID: 0468901

Washington Township is one of seventeen townships in Appanoose County, Iowa, United States. As of the 2010 census, its population was 722.

== History ==
Washington Township was founded in 1848.

== Geography ==
Washington Township covers an area of 36.1 square miles (93.5 km^{2}) and contains one incorporated settlement, Moulton. According to the USGS, it contains six cemeteries: Garland, Hardin, Orleans, Otterbein South, Otterbien and Sunnyview.
