= Davis County, Iowa =

County in Iowa, United States

- County
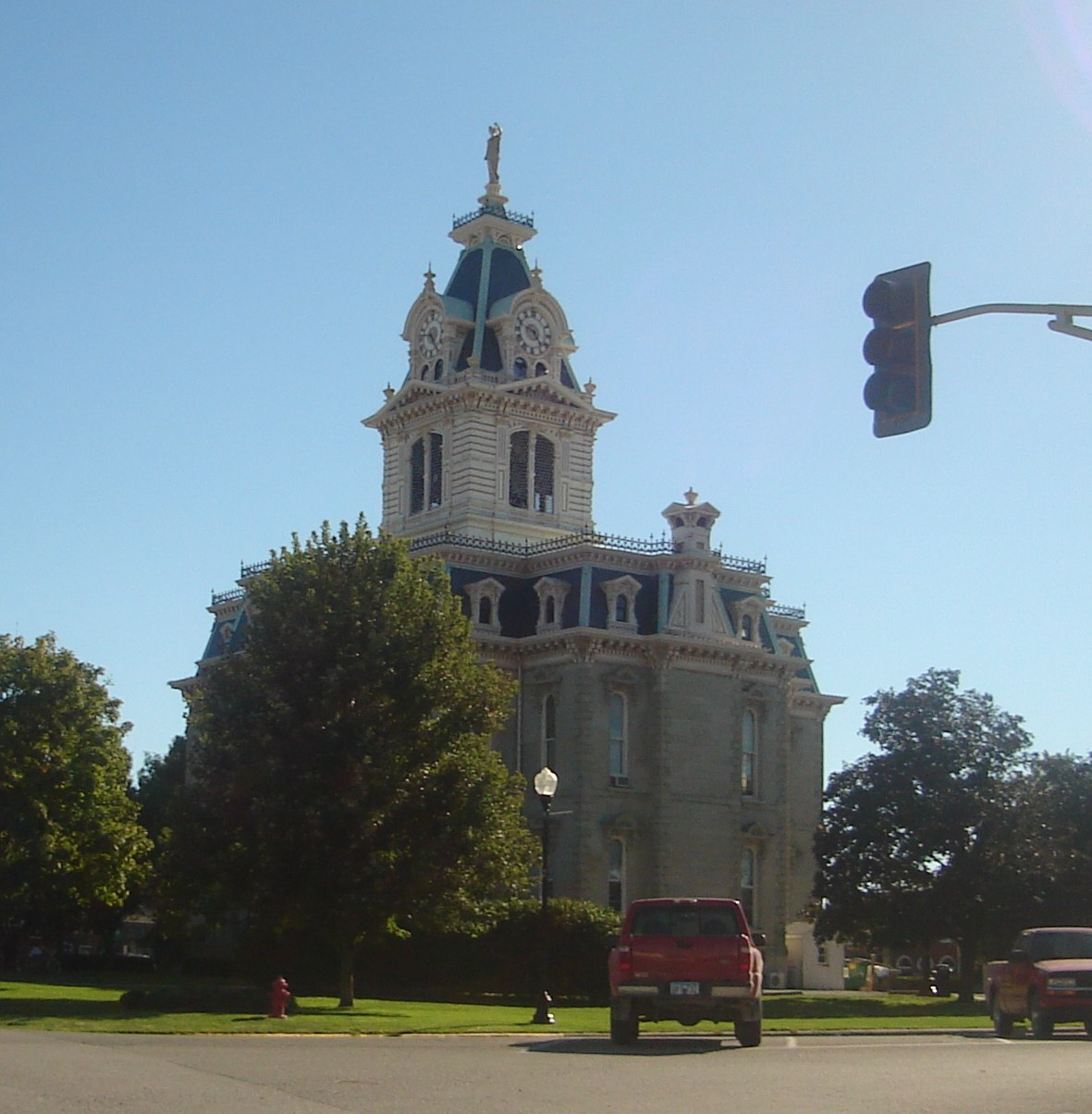
- Davis County Courthouse

- Location within the U.S. state of Iowa
- Coordinates: 40°44′40″N 92°24′48″W
- Country: United States
- State: Iowa
- Founded: 1843
- Named for: Garrett Davis
- Seat: Bloomfield
- Largest city: Bloomfield

Area
  - Total: 505 sq mi (1,310 km^{2})
  - Land: 502 sq mi (1,300 km^{2})
  - Water: 2.7 sq mi (7.0 km^{2}) 0.5%

Population (2020)
  - Total: 9,110
  - Estimate (2025): 9,230 ▲
  - Density: 18.4/sq mi (7.1/km^{2})
- Time zone: UTC−6 (Central)
  - Summer (DST): UTC−5 (CDT)
- Congressional district: 3rd
- Website: www.daviscountyiowa.gov
- Iowa county number 26

Davis County is a county located in the U.S. state of Iowa. As of the 2020 census, the population was 9,110. The county seat is Bloomfield.

Davis County is included in the Ottumwa, IA Micropolitan Statistical Area.

== History ==
Davis County was named in honor of Garrett Davis, a US Representative for Kentucky from 1839 to 1847, and US Senator from 1861 until his death in 1872.

== Geography ==
According to the U.S. Census Bureau, the county has a total area of 505 square miles (1,310 km^{2}), of which 502 square miles (1,300 km^{2}) is land and 2.7 square miles (7.0 km^{2}) (0.5%) is water.

=== Major highways ===
- U.S. Highway 63
- Iowa Highway 2
- Iowa Highway 202

=== Adjacent counties ===
- Wapello County (north)
- Monroe County (northwest)
- Van Buren County (east)
- Jefferson County (northeast)
- Scotland County, Missouri (southeast)
- Schuyler County, Missouri (southwest)
- Appanoose County (west)

== Demographics ==
Historical population
Census	Pop.	Note	%±
1850	7,264		—
1860	13,764		89.5%
1870	15,565		13.1%
1880	16,468		5.8%
1890	15,258		−7.3%
1900	15,620		2.4%
1910	13,315		−14.8%
1920	12,574		−5.6%
1930	11,150		−11.3%
1940	11,136		−0.1%
1950	9,959		−10.6%
1960	9,199		−7.6%
1970	8,207		−10.8%
1980	9,104		10.9%
1990	8,312		−8.7%
2000	8,541		2.8%
2010	8,753		2.5%
2020	9,110		4.1%
2025 (est.)	9,230	▲	1.3%
U.S. Decennial Census:

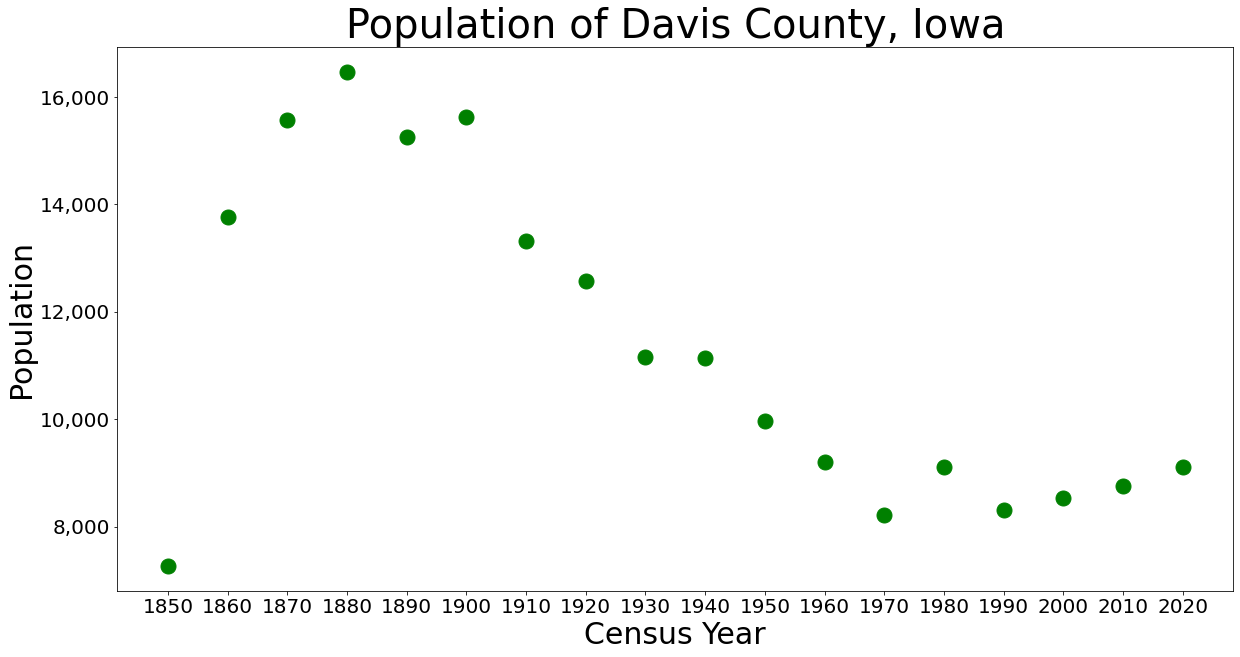
Population of Davis County from US census data

=== 2020 census ===
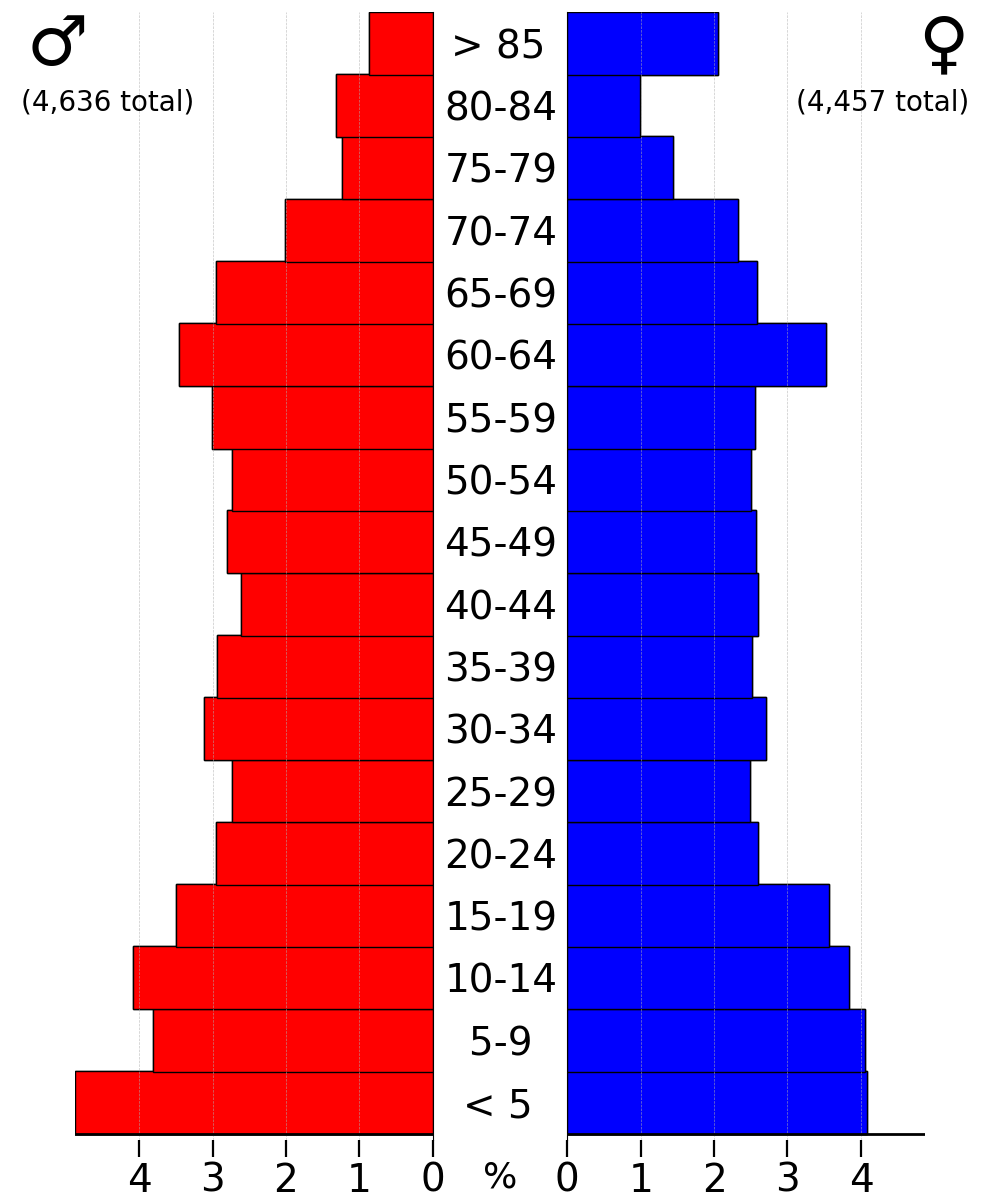
2022 US Census population pyramid for Davis County from ACS 5-year estimates

As of the 2020 census, the county had a population of 9,110 and a population density of 18.0/sq mi (7.0/km^{2}). The median age was 36.0 years; 29.9% of residents were under the age of 18 and 17.7% were 65 years of age or older. For every 100 females there were 98.1 males, and for every 100 females age 18 and over there were 96.8 males age 18 and over.

The racial makeup of the county was 96.6% White, 0.1% Black or African American, 0.1% American Indian and Alaska Native, 0.2% Asian, <0.1% Native Hawaiian and Pacific Islander, 0.5% from some other race, and 2.5% from two or more races; Hispanic or Latino residents of any race comprised 1.6% of the population. Of the population, 97.49% reported being of one race, with 94.98% identifying as non-Hispanic White, 0.09% as Black, 1.58% as Hispanic, 0.12% as Native American, 0.16% as Asian, 0.00% as Native Hawaiian or Pacific Islander and 3.06% as some other race or more than one race.

<0.1% of residents lived in urban areas, while 100.0% lived in rural areas.

There were 3,258 households in the county, of which 34.6% had children under the age of 18 living in them. Of all households, 58.5% were married-couple households, 16.0% were households with a male householder and no spouse or partner present, and 20.5% were households with a female householder and no spouse or partner present. About 25.0% of all households were made up of individuals and 11.9% had someone living alone who was 65 years of age or older.

There were 3,579 housing units, of which 3,258 were occupied and 9.0% were vacant. Among occupied housing units, 78.8% were owner-occupied and 21.2% were renter-occupied. The homeowner vacancy rate was 1.3% and the rental vacancy rate was 8.7%.

=== 2010 census ===
The 2010 census recorded a population of 8,753 in the county, with a population density of 17.4/sq mi (6.7/km^{2}). There were 3,600 housing units, of which 3,201 were occupied.

=== 2000 census ===
As of the census of 2000, there were 8,541 people, 3,207 households, and 2,286 families residing in the county. The population density was 17 people per square mile (6.6 people/km^{2}). There were 3,530 housing units at an average density of 7 units per square mile (2.7 units/km^{2}). The racial makeup of the county was 98.35% White, 0.18% Black or African American, 0.21% Native American, 0.20% Asian, 0.05% Pacific Islander, 0.21% from other races, and 0.81% from two or more races. 0.71% of the population were Hispanic or Latino of any race. 10.4% of the population speak either German or Pennsylvania German at home.

There were 3,207 households, out of which 32.00% had children under the age of 18 living with them, 62.70% were married couples living together, 5.20% had a female householder with no husband present, and 28.70% were non-families. 25.00% of all households were made up of individuals, and 13.80% had someone living alone who was 65 years of age or older. The average household size was 2.61 and the average family size was 3.13.

In the county, the population was spread out, with 27.10% under the age of 18, 7.40% from 18 to 24, 25.20% from 25 to 44, 22.90% from 45 to 64, and 17.40% who were 65 years of age or older. The median age was 38 years. For every 100 females there were 97.90 males. For every 100 females age 18 and over, there were 94.10 males.

The median income for a household in the county was $32,864, and the median income for a family was $40,982. Males had a median income of $26,818 versus $21,726 for females. The per capita income for the county was $15,127. About 9.00% of families and 11.90% of the population were below the poverty line, including 12.70% of those under age 18 and 12.80% of those age 65 or over.

== Religion ==
Davis County contains the largest Amish population in Iowa with 1,860 members recorded as of 2024.

== Communities ==
=== Cities ===
- Bloomfield
- Drakesville
- Floris
- Pulaski

=== Unincorporated communities ===
- Belknap
- Troy
- West Grove

=== Townships ===
Davis County is divided into these townships:

- Cleveland
- Drakesville
- Fabius
- Fox River
- Grove
- Lick Creek
- Marion
- Perry
- Prairie
- Roscoe
- Salt Creek
- Soap Creek
- Union
- West Grove
- Wyacondah

=== Population ranking ===
The population ranking of the following table is based on the 2020 census of Davis County.

† county seat

Rank	City/Town/etc.	Municipal type	Population (2020 Census)
1	† Bloomfield	City	2,682
2	Pulaski	City	264
3	Drakesville	City	164
4	Floris	City	116

== Notable people ==
- John Pickler, member of the United States House of Representatives, resident of Davis County.
- Art Beckley, American football player and politician
- George W. Clark, American politician and Governor of Iowa
- Nelson M. Cooke, Naval officer and author
- James B. Weaver, American politician and presidential candidate
- Otto Ernest Rayburn, folklorist of the Ozarks

== Politics ==
United States presidential election results for Davis County, Iowa
Year	Republican		Democratic		Third party(ies)	
Year	No.	%	No.	%	No.	%
1896	1,652	40.87%	2,367	58.56%	23	0.57%
1900	1,656	42.76%	2,155	55.64%	62	1.60%
1904	1,722	50.92%	1,533	45.33%	127	3.76%
1908	1,484	44.98%	1,749	53.02%	66	2.00%
1912	1,184	38.63%	1,453	47.41%	428	13.96%
1916	1,476	44.14%	1,811	54.16%	57	1.70%
1920	3,117	56.31%	2,353	42.51%	65	1.17%
1924	2,804	48.76%	1,802	31.33%	1,145	19.91%
1928	3,097	54.52%	2,559	45.04%	25	0.44%
1932	1,757	33.82%	3,351	64.50%	87	1.67%
1936	2,815	44.59%	3,463	54.86%	35	0.55%
1940	2,975	46.65%	3,374	52.91%	28	0.44%
1944	2,559	48.12%	2,727	51.28%	32	0.60%
1948	2,276	42.90%	2,982	56.21%	47	0.89%
1952	3,195	58.14%	2,283	41.55%	17	0.31%
1956	2,661	51.88%	2,458	47.92%	10	0.19%
1960	2,641	53.36%	2,303	46.53%	5	0.10%
1964	1,424	32.35%	2,966	67.38%	12	0.27%
1968	2,016	47.12%	1,904	44.51%	358	8.37%
1972	2,287	54.61%	1,806	43.12%	95	2.27%
1976	1,631	39.50%	2,426	58.76%	72	1.74%
1980	2,003	50.97%	1,689	42.98%	238	6.06%
1984	1,956	46.77%	2,187	52.30%	39	0.93%
1988	1,563	40.61%	2,246	58.35%	40	1.04%
1992	1,344	33.26%	1,962	48.55%	735	18.19%
1996	1,445	38.44%	1,894	50.39%	420	11.17%
2000	1,956	52.05%	1,691	45.00%	111	2.95%
2004	2,148	54.82%	1,731	44.18%	39	1.00%
2008	2,029	53.14%	1,680	44.00%	109	2.85%
2012	2,138	56.67%	1,520	40.29%	115	3.05%
2016	2,723	70.14%	977	25.17%	182	4.69%
2020	3,032	73.92%	1,013	24.70%	57	1.39%
2024	3,027	76.56%	878	22.21%	49	1.24%

== Education ==
The vast majority of Davis County is in the Davis County Community School District. Other school districts taking portions of the county include:

- Cardinal Community School District
- Eddyville–Blakesburg–Fremont Community School District - Formed on July 1, 2012.
- Moravia Community School District
- Moulton-Udell Community School District
- Van Buren County Community School District

Former school districts include:

- Eddyville–Blakesburg Community School District - Merged into Eddyville-Blakesburg-Fremont on July 1, 2012.

== See also ==
- National Register of Historic Places listings in Davis County, Iowa
