= Iowa Highway 98 =

Former state highway in Iowa, United States

Iowa Highway 98
- Iowa 98 highlighted in red

Route information
- Maintained by Iowa DOT
- Length: 1.814 mi (2.919 km)
- Existed: 1944–2017

Major junctions
- South end: CR V64 in Leando
- North end: Iowa 16 north of Douds

Location
- Country: United States
- State: Iowa
- Counties: Van Buren

Highway system
- Iowa Primary Highway System; Interstate; US; State; Secondary; Scenic
← Iowa 96	→ Iowa 99

Iowa Highway 98 (Iowa 98) was a state highway that ran from south to north in Van Buren County in southeastern Iowa. It began at Clay Street in Leando, crossed the Des Moines River, and ended at Iowa 16 north of Douds.

There have been two instances of Iowa 98 since Iowa's Primary Highway System was created in 1920. The first was a spur route connecting Eldon to what is now U.S. Highway 34 (US 34). That route was absorbed into an extended Iowa 16 in 1944. At the same time, the second Iowa 98 was created from a vacated segment of Iowa 16. The highway was extended over the Des Moines River into Leando in 1954. It was turned over to Van Buren County at the end of 2017.

== Route description ==
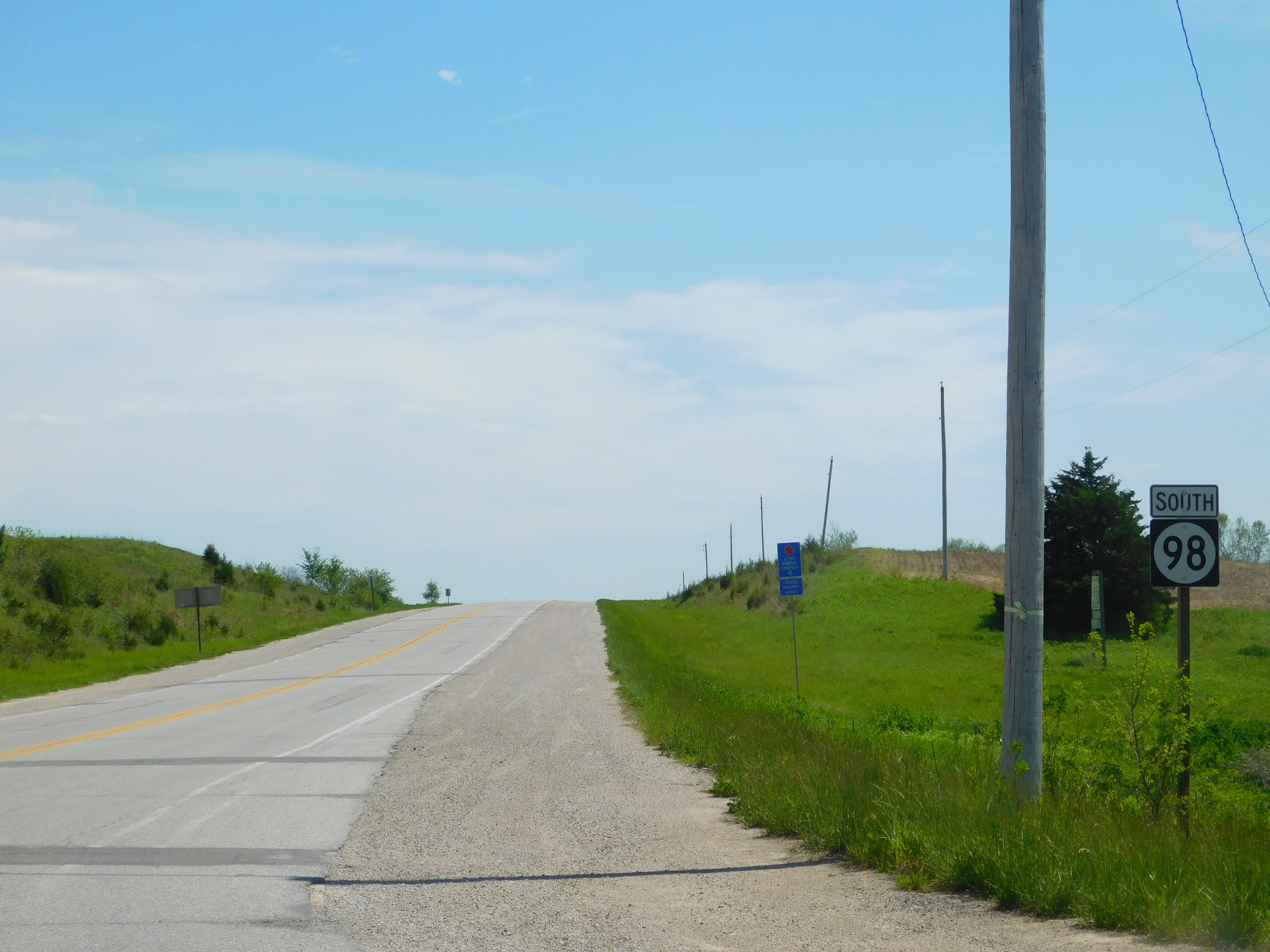
Iowa 98 before decommissioning in Village Township

Iowa 98 began in the census-designated place (CDP) of Leando at an intersection with Clay Street. East of the intersection, the road continued as Van Buren County Road V64 (CR V64) while Iowa 98 headed to the west. For the first one-fifth mile (320 m) of its routing, the two-lane highway ran parallel to and approximately 400 feet (120 m) from the Des Moines River. The highway then turned to the north and crossed the river. On the northern banks, it entered Douds, which is also a CDP. Douds sprawls for three-quarters mile (1.2 km), despite only having a population of 152 in the 2010 Census. Iowa 98 continued north for another three-quarters mile (1.2 km) until it reached Iowa 16. North of the intersection, the road continued again as CR V64. The entire route had an annual average daily traffic of 1060 vehicles.

== History ==
There have been two iterations of Iowa 98, both of which have been intricately linked with Iowa 16. The first version of Iowa 98, Primary Road No. 98, was created with the primary road system in 1920. It was a 6-mile-long (9.7 km) spur route which connected Eldon to Primary Road No. 8, which later became U.S. Highway 34. In early 1936, Iowa 98 was extended to Selma on a road that crossed the Des Moines River twice, at Eldon and at Selma. The next year, that stretch of road was replaced by another that did not cross the river.

In early 1933, Iowa 16 was extended west from Iowa 1 near Birmingham to Douds. Eleven years later, Iowa 16 and Iowa 98 were connected. Iowa 16 took over all of the former Iowa 98 through Selma and Eldon, while the second version of Iowa 98 was designated over the short spur to Douds. In 1953, Iowa 98 was extended south over the Des Moines River to Leando.

On December 28, 2017, the Iowa Department of Transportation transferred Iowa 98 to the Van Buren County Secondary Roads Department. To cover the cost of maintenance, the DOT paid $2.31 million (equivalent to $2.9 million in 2024) to the county.

== Major intersections ==
The entire route was in Van Buren County.

Location	mi	km	Destinations	Notes
Leando	0.000	0.000	CR V64 (Clay Street)	Road continues as CR V64
Village Township	1.814	2.919	Iowa 16 to Iowa 1 / CR V64 – Libertyville, Eldon	Road continues as CR V64
1.000 mi = 1.609 km; 1.000 km = 0.621 mi
