= Iowa Highway 16 =

State highway in Iowa, United States

Iowa Highway 16
- Iowa 16 highlighted in red

Route information
- Maintained by Iowa DOT
- Length: 65.488 mi (105.393 km)

Major junctions
- West end: US 34 / CR V43 near Agency
- Iowa 1 near Birmingham; US 218 / Iowa 27 near Houghton
- East end: US 61 / Great River Road at Wever

Location
- Country: United States
- State: Iowa
- Counties: Wapello; Davis; Van Buren; Henry; Lee

Highway system
- Iowa Primary Highway System; Interstate; US; State; Secondary; Scenic
← Iowa 15	→ Iowa 17

Iowa Highway 16 (Iowa 16) is a state highway running from west to east in southeastern Iowa. The highway has a length of 65.18 miles (104.90 km). The western terminus of Iowa Highway 16 is at an intersection with U.S. Highway 34 (US 34) between Agency and Batavia. The eastern terminus is located at Wever at an intersection with US 61.

== Route description ==
Iowa 16 begins at an interchange with US 34 three miles (4.8 km) east of Agency in Wapello County. It heads south along a two-lane road where it passes the campus of Cardinal School District. The highway jogs to the east and then back to the south before it arrives in Eldon. Upon entering Eldon, the road turns to the southeast in order to follow the course of the Des Moines River; the roadway runs roughly parallel to the river until Selma. On the east side of Eldon, tourists are directed to the American Gothic House, made famous by the painting by Iowa artist Grant Wood. Southeast of Eldon, the road clips the northeastern corner of Davis County as it runs through the river's floodplain to Selma. Now in Van Buren County, it passes a quarry and then turns to the east. The highway meets Iowa 98 north of Douds. The road goes through a series of curves that take it further south until it straightens out near the northern intersection with Iowa 1.

The two highways briefly overlap between Birmingham and Keosauqua; Iowa 16 turns off of Iowa 1 to continue east. Once it enters Lee County, the highway takes a sharp curve to the south and then another sharp curve to the east. It runs due east through Houghton and then meets the four-lane US 218 / Iowa 27, the Avenue of the Saints highway, at an at-grade intersection. The road continues its general east-and-south path through Denmark. The highway ends at an intersection with US 61 between Wever and the Skunk River.

== History ==
The current version of Iowa Highway 16 is the second occurrence of the route number in the state; the route number first occurred on a highway that was decommissioned in 1930 and ran between the Minnesota and Missouri state lines.

== Major intersections ==
County	Location	mi	km	Destinations	Notes
Wapello	Pleasant Township	0.000	0.000	US 34 / CR V43 north – Ottumwa, Mount Pleasant	
Davis	No major junctions				
Van Buren	Village Township	15.015	24.164	CR V64 – Leando, Libertyville	Formerly Iowa 98
Van Buren	Lick Creek–Union township line	22.465	36.154	Iowa 1 north – Fairfield	Western end of Iowa 1 overlap
Van Buren	Van Buren Township	24.679	39.717	Iowa 1 south – Keosauqua	Eastern end of Iowa 1 overlap
Lee	Marion Township	45.777	73.671	US 218 / Iowa 27 – Mount Pleasant, Keokuk	
Lee	Green Bay Township	65.488	105.393	US 61 / Great River Road – Burlington, Fort Madison	
1.000 mi = 1.609 km; 1.000 km = 0.621 mi: Concurrency terminus
