= Iowa Highway 1 =

State highway in Iowa, United States

Iowa Highway 1
- Iowa 1 highlighted in red

Route information
- Maintained by Iowa DOT
- Length: 119.312 mi (192.014 km)
- Existed: ca. 1926–present

Major junctions
- South end: Iowa 2 near Keosauqua
- US 34 / Iowa 163 at Fairfield; Iowa 92 in Washington; Iowa 22 in Kalona; US 218 / Iowa 27 at Iowa City; US 6 in Iowa City; I-80 at Iowa City; US 30 at Mount Vernon
- North end: US 151 / CR E34 near Anamosa

Location
- Country: United States
- State: Iowa
- Counties: Van Buren; Jefferson; Keokuk; Washington; Johnson; Linn; Jones

Highway system
- Iowa Primary Highway System; Interstate; US; State; Secondary; Scenic
← Iowa 965	→ Iowa 2

Iowa Highway 1 (Iowa 1) is a state highway in the U.S. state of Iowa that extends from Keosauqua to Anamosa. It travels nearly 120 miles (190 km), mainly through rich farmland and small communities. Iowa 1 provides an important link to Iowa City and the University of Iowa as it passes through campus. Portions of the route today date back to the late 1830s, when Martin Van Buren was president, making Iowa 1 one of the oldest routes in the state, pre-dating the current primary highway system by nearly eighty years. The highway was seriously damaged by the Cedar River in the Iowa flood of 2008, which closed the highway for seven weeks.

== Route description ==
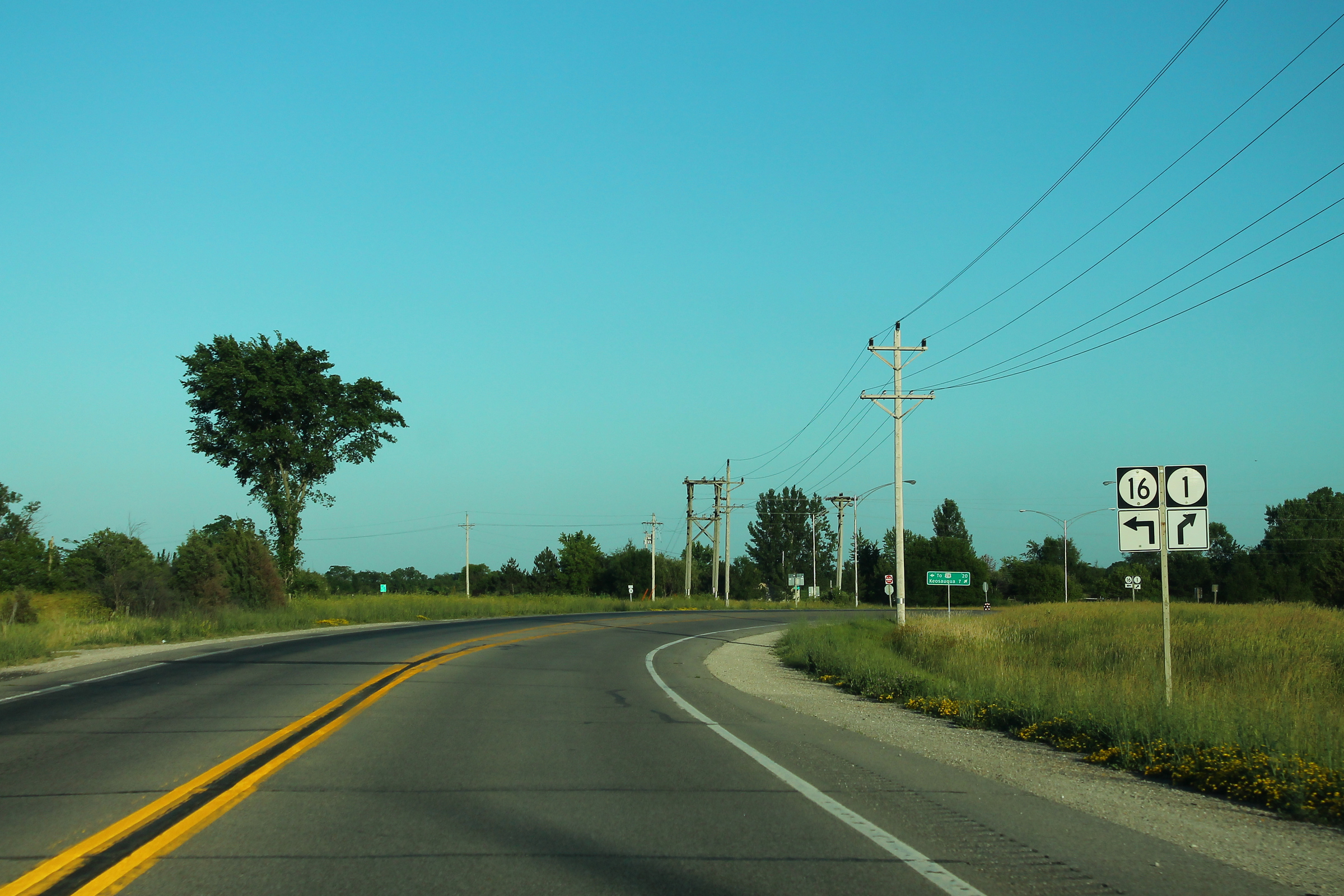
Iowa 1's southbound concurrency with eastbound Iowa Highway 16, June 2016

Iowa 1 begins at a T-intersection with Iowa 2 in rural Van Buren County, south of Keosauqua. It passes through gently rolling farmland for ten miles (16 km) before entering the Des Moines River valley adjacent to Lacey-Keosauqua State Park. The highway crosses the Des Moines River and enters Keosauqua along Main Street. At Broad Street, Iowa 1 turned north and headed out of town. Between Keosauqua and the southern junction with Iowa 16, the highway runs parallel to the Des Moines River, the river's course bends sharply around Keosauqua. South of Birmingham, Iowa 1 briefly overlaps Iowa 16 for two miles (3.2 km). The next seven miles (11 km) run due north passing through Birmingham, before the highway crosses Cedar Creek south of Fairfield.

On the south side of Fairfield, the highway meets the new U.S. Highway 34 (US 34) / Iowa 163 bypass at a partial cloverleaf interchange. Iowa 1 enters Fairfield along Main Street. For one block, Iowa 1 overlaps US 34 Business on Burlington Street before turning onto Second Street. Along Second Street, the highway passes under a BNSF Railway / Amtrak viaduct. North of the viaduct, Iowa 1 turns west for two blocks along Merrill Avenue and turns north again onto Fourth Street. On the northern edge of Fairfield, the highway passes next to Maharishi International University.

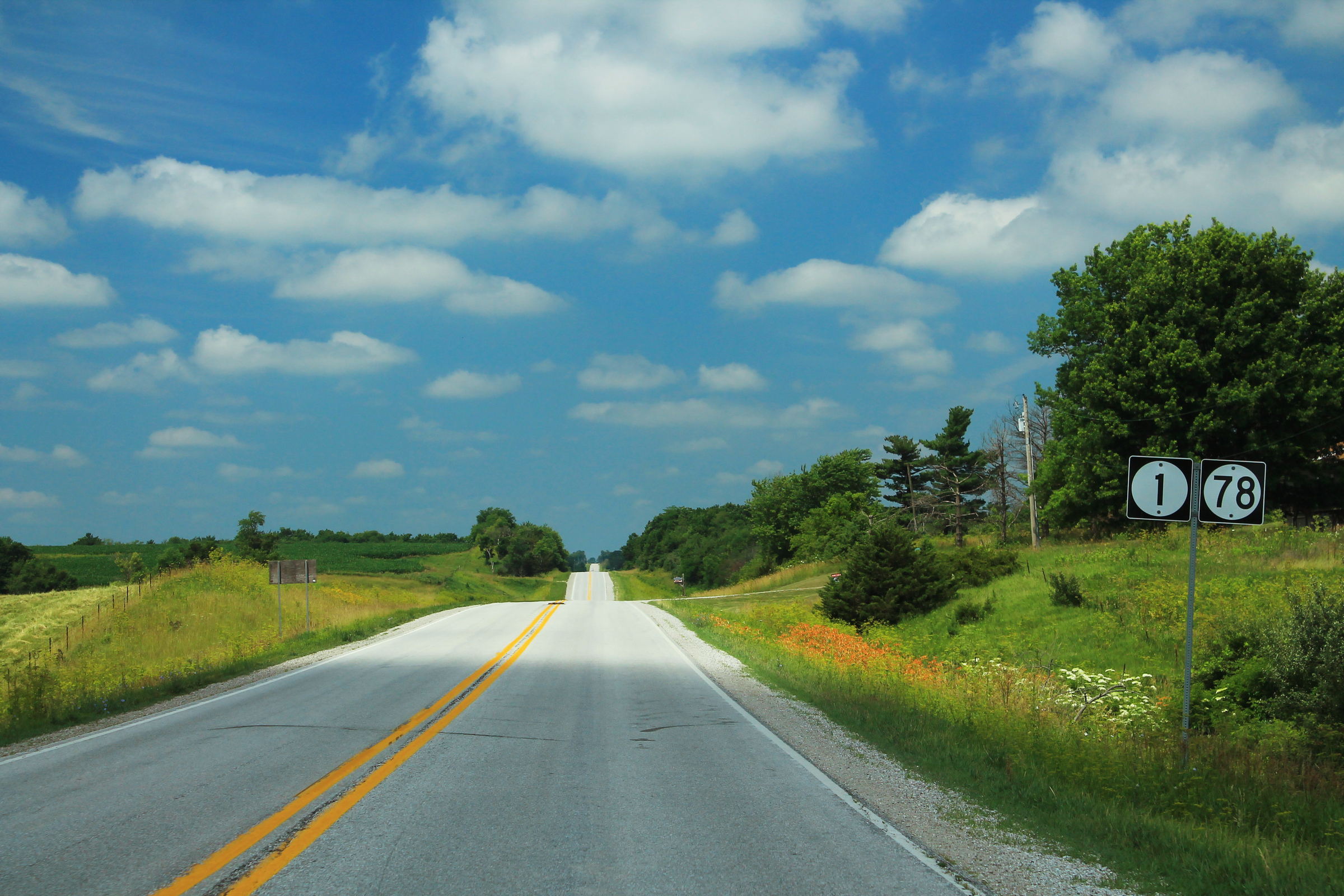
Iowa 1's southbound concurrency with westbound Iowa Highway 78, June 2016

North of Fairfield, Iowa 1 passes the Fairfield Municipal Airport and Maharishi Vedic City. For the next nine miles (14 km), the highway continues due north through Jefferson and Keokuk County. Southeast of Richland, Iowa 1 meets Iowa 78 at a T-intersection. Heading east from this intersection, Iowa 1 and Iowa 78 overlap for seven and a half miles (12.1 km) until entering Brighton on Fountain Street. Iowa 1 splits off to the north onto Benton Street while Iowa 78 turns to the south and east. North of Brighton, it crosses the Skunk River and passes through the river's one-mile-wide (1.6 km) valley. For nine miles (14 km), Iowa 1 passes through southern Washington County heading northeast towards Washington.

At Washington, Iowa 1 intersects Iowa 92 on the southwestern edge of town. The two highways curve around to the north and split three miles (4.8 km) later. Iowa 1 passes through flat farmland before crossing the English River south of Kalona. Iowa 1 skirts the western edge of Kalona and intersects Iowa Highway 22. It continues north for seven miles (11 km) before turning northeast for eight miles (13 km) more towards Iowa City.

Iowa 1 intersects US 218 and Iowa 27, the Avenue of the Saints, at a diamond interchange on the southwestern edge of Iowa City. It curves to the north of Iowa City Municipal Airport, intersecting US 6 at Riverside Drive. For three-quarters mile (1.2 km), Iowa 1 overlaps US 6 on Riverside Drive before crossing the Iowa River in downtown Iowa City. On Burlington Street, Iowa 1 passes the University of Iowa library, the old state capitol, and the Ped Mall. Iowa 1 turns north onto the one-way Governor Street; Dodge Street handles the accompanying southbound lanes of traffic. The one-way streets rejoin as Dodge Street before intersecting Interstate 80 (I-80) at another diamond interchange.

Iowa 1 continues north through Johnson County for twelve miles (19 km), passing through Solon. At Solon, it intersects County Road F16, which provides access to Lake MacBride State Park. Six miles (9.7 km) southwest of Mount Vernon, Iowa 1 turns to the northeast, entering Linn County and crossing the Cedar River before entering Mount Vernon, where it intersects US 30. At First Street, Iowa 1 crosses the Lincoln Highway. On the northern edge of Mount Vernon, Iowa 1 crosses a major Union Pacific Railroad line. Iowa 1 continues north towards Martelle, where it enters Jones County. three and a half miles (5.6 km) northeast of Martelle, Iowa 1 ends at a partial cloverleaf interchange with US 151.

== History ==
The current Iowa 1 was designated in the 1926 Iowa highway renumbering, extending from Iowa 3 near Keosauqua to US 32 in Iowa City as a renumbering of a portion of Primary Road No. 11. Iowa 3 was renumbered Iowa 2 in 1941 to match Nebraska's highway. In 1930, it extended east to Iowa 38 in Rochester, replacing Iowa 139. In 1962, Iowa 1 was realigned north of Iowa City replacing Iowa 261 from Anamosa to Iowa City. This section approximately follows part of the route of the territorial and military road from Dubuque to Iowa City. This road, authorized by President Martin Van Buren in 1839, was known as Dillon's Furrow, named after Dubuque merchant Lyman Dillon who surveyed the route and marked it with a furrow. Most of the deviations of the route of Iowa 1 from Dillon's original route are the result of road straightening or bypasses around town centers. The leftover section of Iowa 1 from Iowa City to Iowa 38, part of the Herbert Hoover Highway, became the unsigned Iowa 979.

In 1997, it was announced that parts of US 151 and Iowa 1 would become the first Super two highways in Iowa. A 42-mile (68 km) section between Washington and US 30 was to be improved in 2002, but because of funding shortages, the project was scratched.

In the Iowa flood of 2008, flood waters of the Cedar River caused the closure of Iowa 1 between Solon and Mount Vernon on June 12, 2008. Once the floods receded, major damage was left behind. Repair work began on July 11 and was completed by July 30, 2008.

== Major intersections ==
County	Location	mi	km	Destinations	Notes
Van Buren	Des Moines–Vernon township line	0.000	0.000	Iowa 2 – Farmington, Cantril	
Van Buren	Van Buren Township	10.358	16.670	Iowa 16 east to US 218	Southern end of Iowa 16 overlap
Van Buren	Lick Creek–Union township line	12.572	20.233	Iowa 16 west – Eldon	Northern end of Iowa 16 overlap
Jefferson	Fairfield	22.992	37.002	US 34 / Iowa 163 – Ottumwa, Mount Pleasant	
Jefferson	Fairfield	24.579	39.556	US 34 Bus. east (Burlington Avenue)	Southern end of US 34 Business overlap
Jefferson	Fairfield	24.645	39.662	US 34 Bus. west (Burlington Avenue)	Northern end of US 34 Business overlap
Jefferson	Black Hawk Township	33.494	53.903	CR H17 – Packwood	Former Iowa 356
Keokuk	Richland Township	36.638	58.963	Iowa 78 west – Richland	Southern end of Iowa 78 overlap
Washington	Brighton	44.246	71.207	Iowa 78 east – Wayland	Northern end of Iowa 78 overlap
Washington	Washington	54.790	88.176	Iowa 92 east (Madison Street) – Washington, Columbus Junction	Southern end of Iowa 92 overlap
Washington	Cedar–Jackson– Washington township tripoint	57.857	93.112	Iowa 92 west / CR G36 – Sigourney	Northern end of Iowa 92 overlap
Washington	Kalona	68.115	109.620	Iowa 22 – Riverside, Wellman	
Johnson	Iowa City	83.252	133.981	US 218 / Iowa 27 – Cedar Rapids, Mount Pleasant	
Johnson	Iowa City	85.171	137.069	US 6 east – West Liberty	Southern end of US 6 overlap
Johnson	Iowa City	85.911	138.260	US 6 west (Riverside Drive)	Northern end of US 6 overlap
Johnson	Iowa City	89.553	144.122	I-80 – Davenport, Des Moines	
Johnson	Solon	98.266	158.144	CR F16 – Lake Macbride State Park	Former Iowa 382
Linn	Mount Vernon	107.019	172.230	US 30 – Lisbon, Cedar Rapids	
Linn	Mount Vernon	107.481	172.974	Lincoln Highway	Roundabout; former US 30
Linn	Mount Vernon	107.959	173.743	Lincoln Highway Heritage Byway	Former Iowa 974, US 30
Jones	Fairview Township	119.312	192.014	US 151 / CR E34 – Cedar Rapids, Dubuque	
1.000 mi = 1.609 km; 1.000 km = 0.621 mi: Concurrency terminus
