= Utica, Iowa =

- Unincorporated community
- Location within Iowa
- Coordinates: 40°48′53″N 91°50′06″W
- Country: United States
- State: Iowa
- County: Van Buren
- Elevation: 741 ft (226 m)
- Time zone: UTC-6 (Central (CST))
  - Summer (DST): UTC-5 (CDT)
- GNIS feature ID: 462507

Utica is an unincorporated community in Van Buren County, in the U.S. state of Iowa.

== Geography ==
The community is at the junction of County Road W-30 and Iowa Highway 16. It is in section 6 of Harrisburg Township and section 1 of Washington Township.

== History ==
The Utica post office was established December 4, 1819; Robert Brownfield was the first postmaster. The Utica townsite was founded June 9, 1857, by John Whetsel, and was, according to The Annals of Iowa, probably named for Utica, New York. The Utica post office was discontinued on July 15, 1903.

The population of Utica was 66 in 1902, and was 38 in 1925.

Utica was the home of Iowa State Representative Joseph A. Keck, who served in the 28th General Assembly. Keck was a member in the Utica Methodist Episcopal Church and was a Sunday school worker. He lived for fifty years in Van Buren County before moving to Seattle, Washington, in 1910.

The population of Utica in 1940 was 20.

== See also ==
- Vernon, Iowa
