= Prairie Township, Davis County, Iowa =

Prairie Township
- Township
- Location in Davis County
- Coordinates: 40°41′29″N 92°14′01″W
- Country: United States
- State: Iowa
- County: Davis

Area
  - Total: 27.63 sq mi (71.57 km^{2})
  - Land: 27.58 sq mi (71.42 km^{2})
  - Water: 0.058 sq mi (0.15 km^{2}) 0.21%
- Elevation: 794 ft (242 m)

Population (2000)
  - Total: 394
  - Density: 14/sq mi (5.5/km^{2})
- GNIS feature ID: 0468568

Prairie Township is a township in Davis County, Iowa, USA. As of the 2000 census, its population was 394. In 2020 the population was 395.

== History ==
Prairie Township was organized in 1846.

== Geography ==
Prairie Township covers an area of 27.63 square miles (71.57 square kilometers); of this, 0.06 square miles (0.15 square kilometers) or 0.21 percent is water.

=== Cities and towns ===
- Pulaski

=== Adjacent townships ===
- Union Township (north)
- Chequest Township, Van Buren County (northeast)
- Jackson Township, Van Buren County (east)
- Roscoe Township (south)
- Cleveland Township (west)
- Grove Township (west)
- Perry Township (northwest)

=== Cemeteries ===
The township contains seven cemeteries: Amish Mennonite Church, Armstrong, K P, Knights of Pythias Lodge, Pansy Hill, Pulaski and Wheaton.
