= Bentonsport Bridge =

Bridge in Iowa

The Bentonsport Bridge is located on the Des Moines River connecting Bentonsport to Vernon, Iowa, and is on the National Register of Historic Places. It is located in the Bentonsport National Historic District.

The truss bridge dates to 1882. The King Iron Bridge and Manufacturing Company of Cleveland, Ohio fabricated and erected the wrought iron trusses. The bridge is composed of five 146-foot, pinned Pratt trusses. The bridge is 730 feet long and 16 feet wide. Local masons Snyder and Kramer did the stonework for the piers. The cost in 1882 was $33,309.

In 1903, a major flood on the Des Moines River washed away a middle span of the bridge. Local folklore suggests that the replacement was erected on the frozen river during the winter and hoisted into place with derricks with help from elephants from a traveling circus troupe who were wintering nearby in northeast Missouri.

In 1972, parts of Bentonsport and Vernon - and the bridge were designated a National Historic District.

The Bentonsport bridge carried vehicle traffic until 1985 when a new bridge was completed just upriver. Since that time the old truss bridge has continued to be used by pedestrians.

In 2024, the Iowa Transportation Commission awarded $1.6 million to Van Buren County to rehabilitate the aging structure, including structural improvements and an expanded pedestrian walkway. Work is expected to be completed in 2025.
