= Stone Academy (Solon, Iowa) =

- U.S. National Register of Historic Places
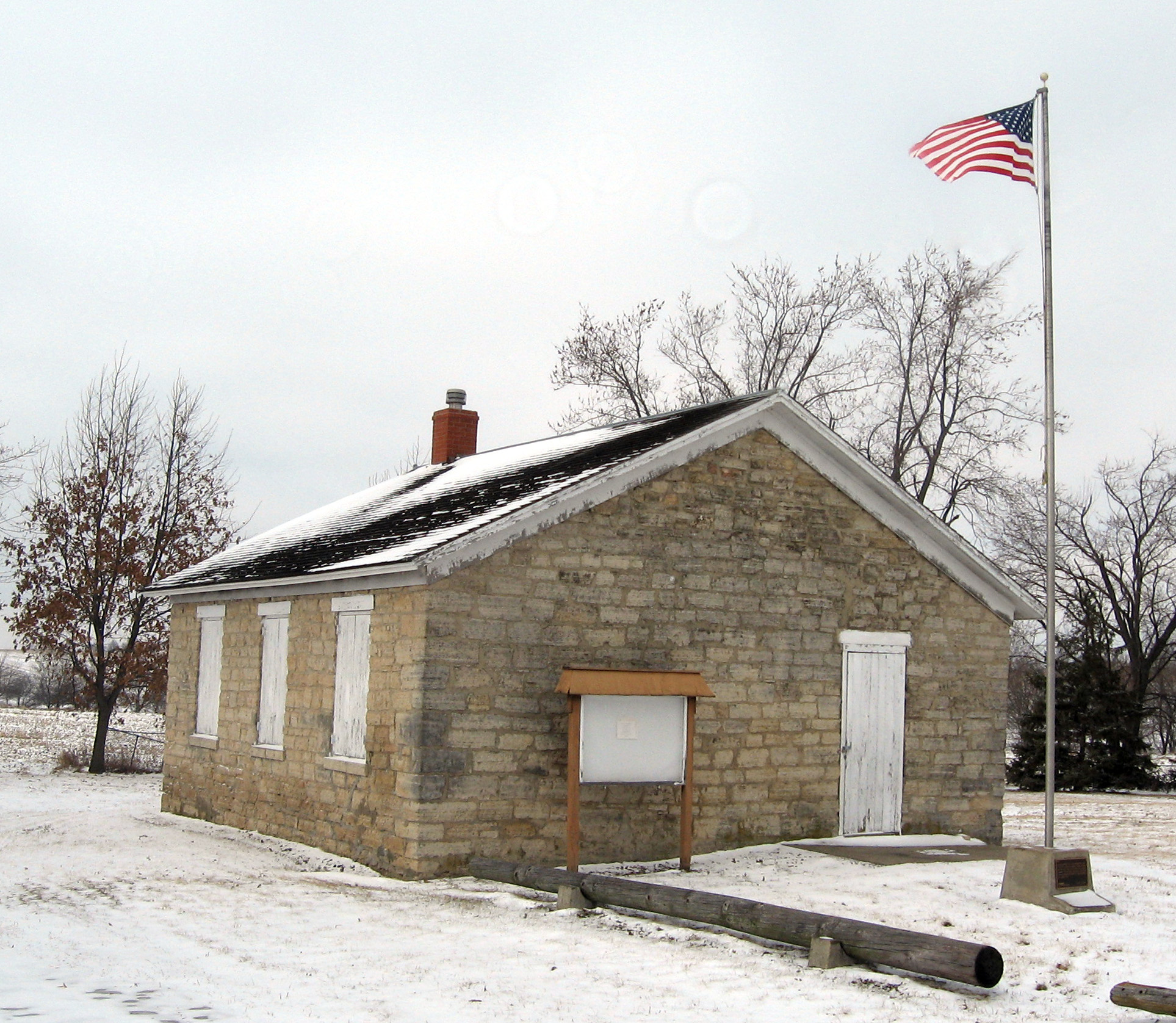
- The historic schoolhouse in the Wintertime

- Location within Iowa Location within the United States
- Nearest city: Solon, Iowa
- Coordinates: 41°50′20″N 91°30′5″W
- Built: 1842
- NRHP reference No.: 00001653
- Added to NRHP: January 16, 2001

Stone Academy in Solon, Iowa is a public one-room schoolhouse believed to have been built in 1842, located about two miles north of Solon's town center along the west side of Iowa Highway 1, which was the Old Military Road linking Dubuque to Iowa City. It was formerly known as the Big Grove Township School #1. It is one of the oldest surviving school buildings in Iowa.

It is a rectangular building built of limestone from the McCune quarry about two miles away. Its interior walls are plastered.

It is currently a museum, open for tours by appointment only.
