= Roscoe Township, Davis County, Iowa =

Roscoe Township
- Township
- Location in Davis County
- Coordinates: 40°37′55″N 92°14′20″W
- Country: United States
- State: Iowa
- County: Davis

Area
  - Total: 25.50 sq mi (66.05 km^{2})
  - Land: 25.45 sq mi (65.91 km^{2})
  - Water: 0.054 sq mi (0.14 km^{2}) 0.21%
- Elevation: 801 ft (244 m)

Population (2000)
  - Total: 233
  - Density: 9.1/sq mi (3.5/km^{2})
- GNIS feature ID: 0468640

Roscoe Township is a township in Davis County, Iowa, USA. As of the 2000 census, its population was 233.

== Geography ==
Roscoe Township covers an area of 25.5 square miles (66.05 square kilometers); of this, 0.05 square miles (0.14 square kilometers), or 0.21 percent, is water.

=== Unincorporated towns ===
- Waneta
- Wanetta Corner

(This list is based on USGS data and may include former settlements.)

=== Adjacent townships ===
- Prairie Township (north)
- Jackson Township, Van Buren County (east)
- Grove Township (west)

=== Cemeteries ===
The township contains three cemeteries: Brown, Hubbard and Round Grove.
