= V64 =

V64 may refer to:

- County Road V64 (Van Buren County, Iowa)
- Doctor V64, an accessory for the Nintendo 64
- Vanadium-64, an isotope of vanadium
