= IA16 =

IA16 may refer to:

- Iowa Highway 16
- Intel's 16-bit x86 processor architecture (a retronym)
