= Saints Peter and Paul Catholic Church (Solon, Iowa) =

- U.S. National Register of Historic Places
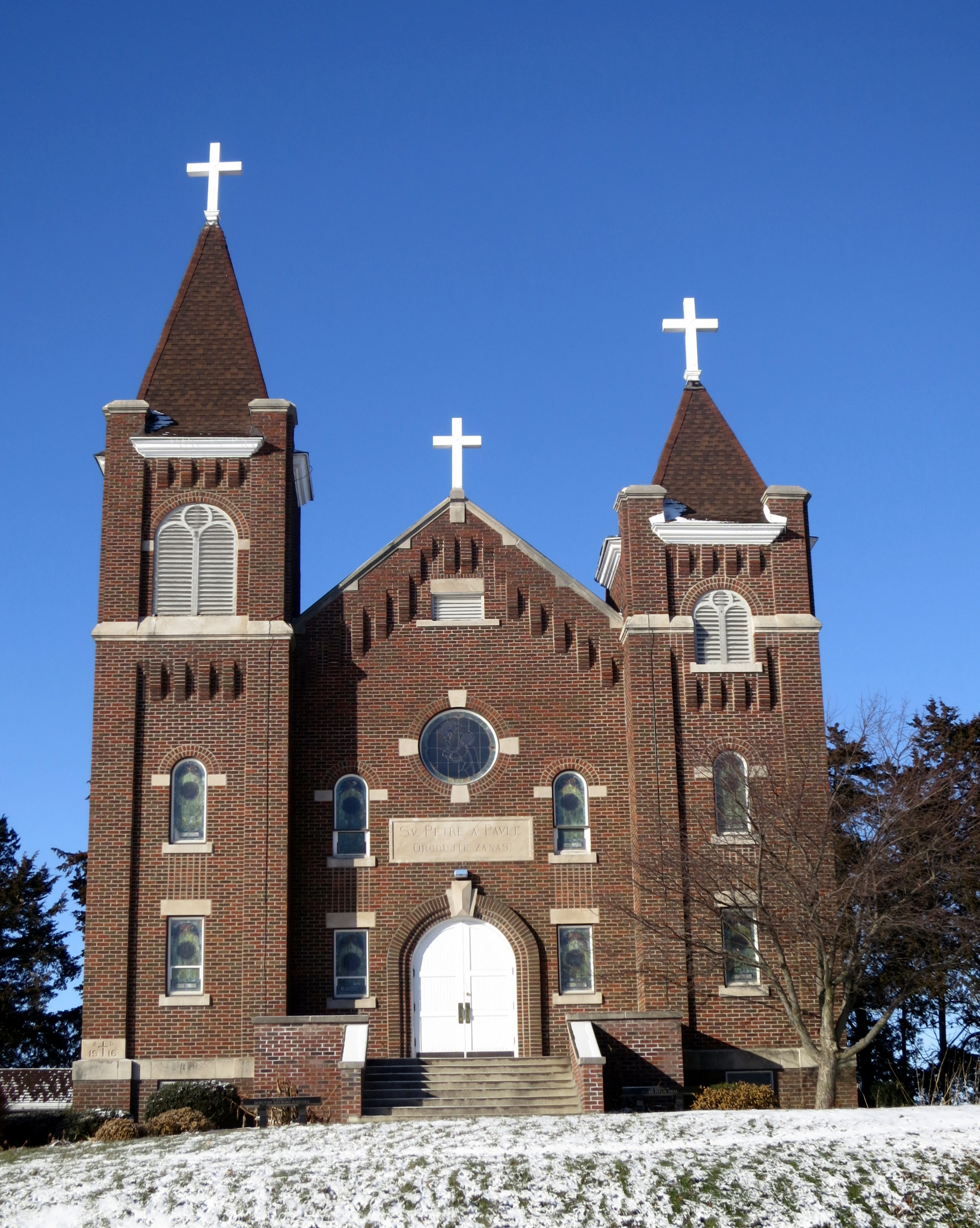
- Saints Peter and Paul Chapel in rural Solon Iowa

- Location within Iowa Location within the United States
- Location: 1165 NE Taft Avenue; Solon, Iowa
- Coordinates: 41°50′56.19″N 91°27′51.12″W
- Area: 2.5 acres (1.0 ha)
- Built: 1916-1917
- Architect: R. K. Parkinson
- Architectural style: Late 19th and 20th century Revivals
- NRHP reference No.: 97000622
- Added to NRHP: March 12, 1999

Saints Peter and Paul Catholic Church is a former parish church of the Diocese of Davenport. The church is located in rural Solon, Iowa, United States. The property is on a gravel road east of Iowa Highway 1 between Solon and Mount Vernon in rural Johnson County. It was listed on the National Register of Historic Places in 1999.

== History ==
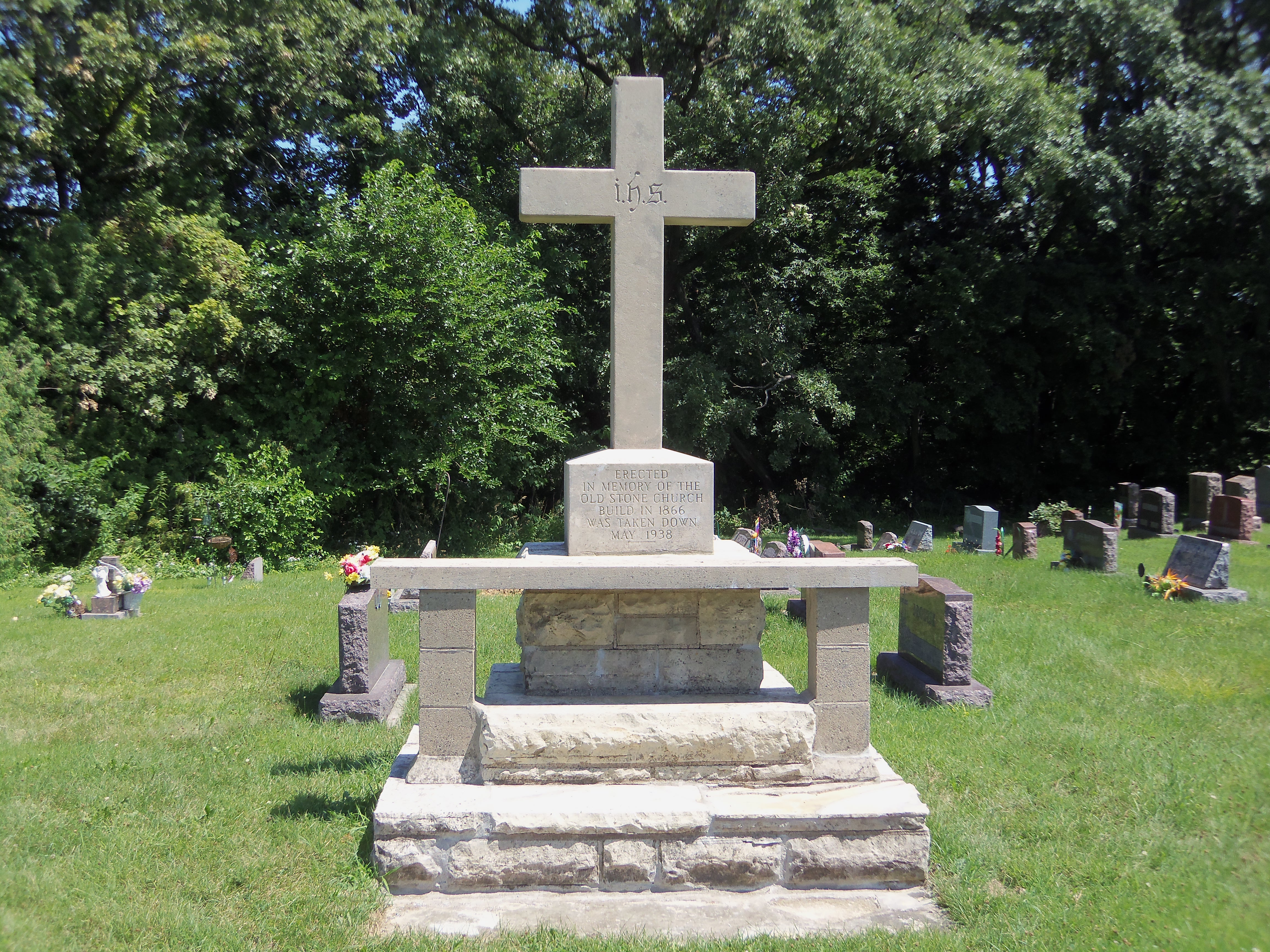
Memorial to the old stone church located in the cemetery across the street.

Saints Peter and Paul Catholic Church was founded around 1861 to serve Czech Bohemian immigrants who began settling near Solon in 1854. It was the first Bohemian Catholic congregation in Iowa. They initially met in area schoolhouses with or without a priest. The first church building used by the parish was built of stone and located across the road from the present building. The stone was quarried locally and the building was built by hand for $1,300. In time the building started to deteriorate and it was closed in 1916 and was torn down in 1938. A monument to the first church is located in the cemetery where its altar was located.

Ground was broken for the present church building on April 18, 1916. It was dedicated on July 15, 1917. The Rev. Florian Svrdlik from St. Wenceslaus Church in Cedar Rapids, Iowa, preached the sermon at the ceremony. The bid for constructing the building was $13,800.

The parish, like many in rural Iowa, was a victim of declining numbers of clergy and people who opted to live and work on farms. On March 28, 1996, Bishop William Franklin announced in The Catholic Messenger that Saints Peter and Paul's would close by the end of June. The parish was merged with St. Mary's in Solon on June 30 of that year, and the church building was officially closed. Rev. Joseph Sparks of St. Mary's was placed in charge of pastoral management for corporate affairs. That same year members from the former parish organized to preserve the church building. They bought the church from the diocese for a dollar and raised funds to renovate the building. By 1998 the renovation project was completed and the facility is used for weddings and other events.

== Architecture ==
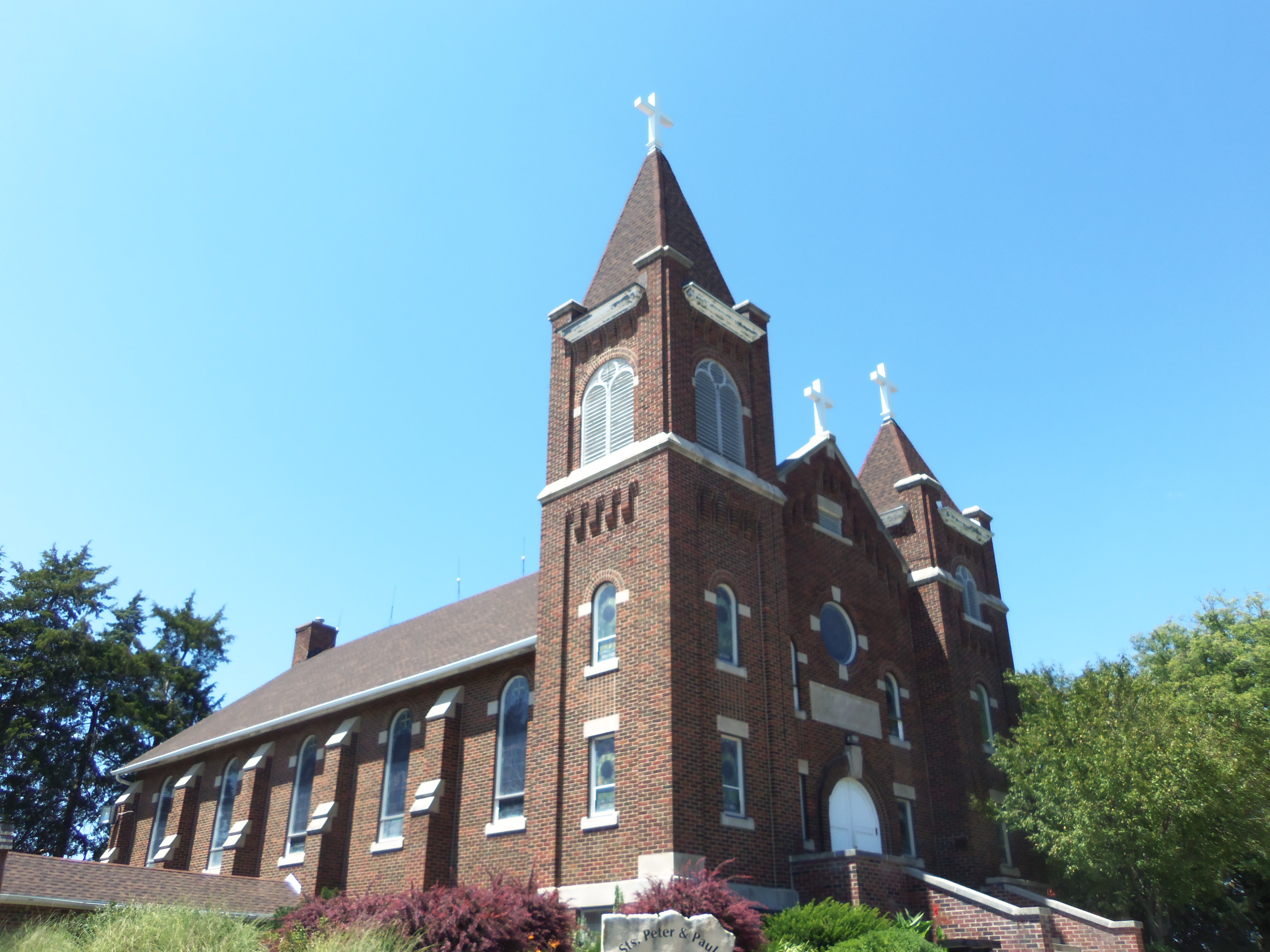
The south elevation.

Saints Peter and Paul Church is a 79-by-35-foot (24 by 11 m) structure that is composed of a steel frame covered with red brick and tile. The church is six bays in length. The first bay on the east end of the building is the towers and main entrance, it is followed by a four-bay nave that is divided by stepped buttresses, and the sixth bay on the west end contains the chancel, which is flanked by two sacristies. The main facade features two uneven towers that flank the man entrance. Above the entrance is an inscription in Czech: Sv. Petře a Pavle Orodujte zanas! (Saints Peter and Paul pray for us!). The two towers are identical until the cornice level when the bell chamber on the south tower rises higher than that of the north tower. Brick corbels are located in the gables, and a circular window is located over the main entrance. Crosses are placed on the pyramid-shaped spires of both towers and on the peak of the gable. The church is built on a raised basement that was used for a parish hall.

The interior is a single nave that is capped with a barrel vaulted ceiling. The Roman (round) arch predominates in the interior decor. It is found prominently in the chancel arch, the blind arches where the side altars are located, the reredos of the high altar, the stained glass windows, and the Stations of the Cross. The altars are carved wood with marbleized painted surfaces. Statues of St. Peter and St. Paul flank a central crucifix in the reredos. A bas-relief of the Last Supper is located on the altar frontal. One of the side altars contains a statue of the Infant of Prague. The primary altar used to celebrate the Mass in later years was from the first parish church. The windows in the nave depict images of saints, including those of Bohemian heritage, St. Wenceslaus, and those associated with agriculture, St. Barbara (patron saint of lightning) and St. Swithun (patron saint of drought). In the church's vestibule is a 19th-century painting portraying St. Peter and St. Paul, which was from Europe. Above the vestibule is a gallery that extends 5 feet (2 m) into the nave.
