= Bentonsport =

- U.S. National Register of Historic Places
- U.S. Historic district
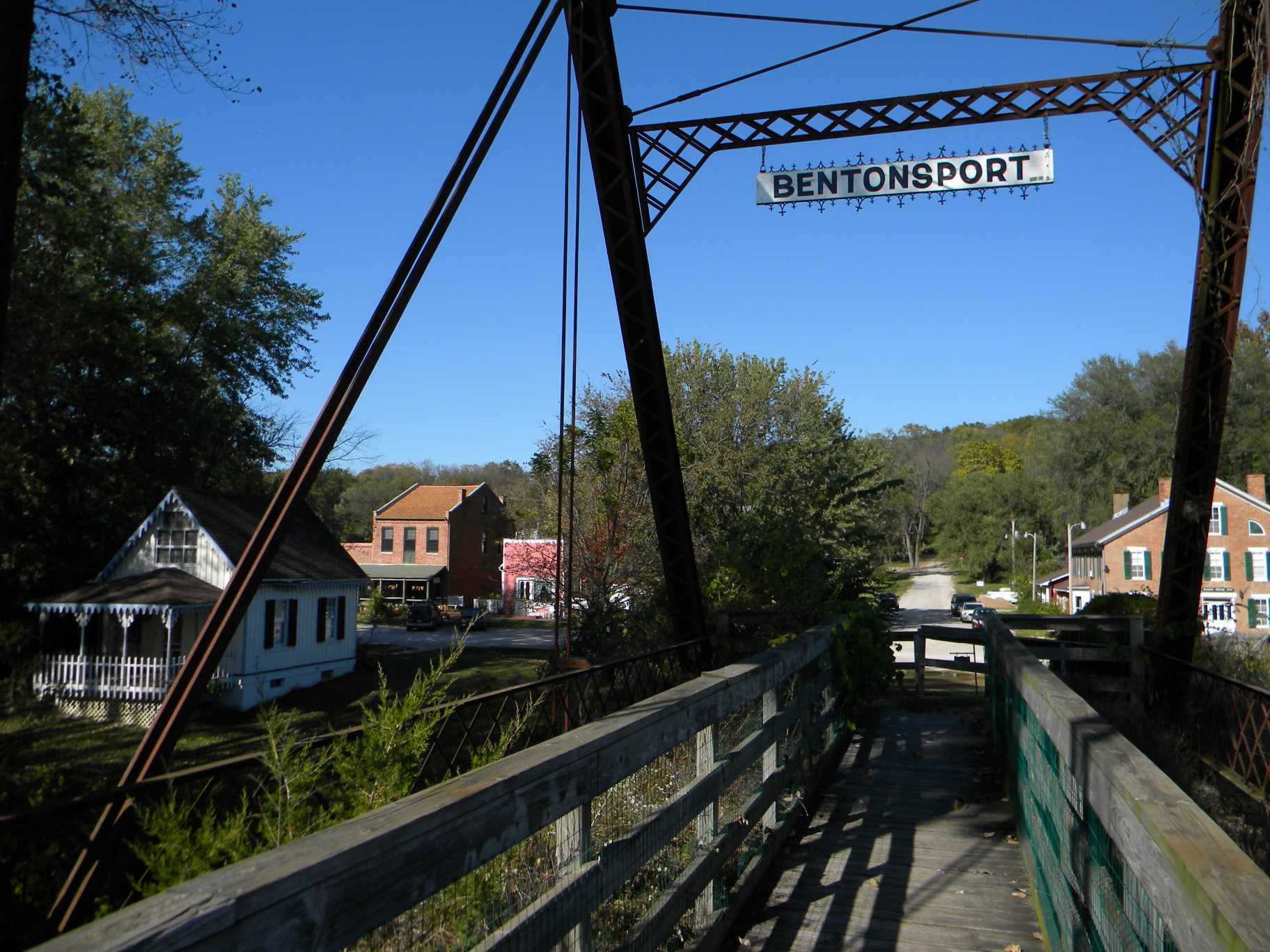
- Historic Bridge and Sign in Bentonsport

- Location within Iowa Location within the United States
- Nearest city: Keosauqua, Iowa
- Coordinates: 40°43′32″N 91°51′13″W
- Area: 35 acres (14 ha)
- Built: 1839
- Architectural style: Federal, Gothic Revival, "Steamboat Gothic"
- NRHP reference No.: 72000482
- Added to NRHP: April 25, 1972

Bentonsport, a village on the Des Moines River near Keosauqua, in Van Buren County, Iowa, was recognized in 1972 for being very little changed since its historic heyday as a thriving steamboat port in the mid-1800s. A 35-acre (14 ha) historic district covering 16 original blocks in the historic center of the village was then approved for listing on the National Register of Historic Places. The district also included waterfront property and the village's historic wagon bridge across the river to the village of Vernon.

The village was platted in March, 1836, and was located at the first dam and locks on the Des Moines River authorized by the state in 1839. Soon it had two grist mills and a saw mill. It was named "Benton's Post" for Thomas Hart Benton and once had a population of about 1,000. It declined after the Keokuk, Fort Des Moines and Minnesota Railroad reached Des Moines in 1866. The river became non-navigable in 1870 and the dam and locks deteriorated, with the dam "failing" in 1879. The Bentonsport bridge opened in 1883 and is the oldest wagon bridge of its type in the county.

The population was 150 in 1940.

Today the village has 40 residents, many of them artists and bed & breakfast keepers.

Bentonsport is home to the Lawrence Sullivan Ross Memorial. Erected in 2007, it is Iowa's only Confederate memorial.

Its historic district includes:

- Cowles House, 1840s
- a blacksmith shop, 1840s
- I.O.O.F. Hall, 1840s, the oldest and perhaps first Odd Fellows Hall in Iowa
- Mason House Inn, 1846
- Sanford House, 1852
- Bentonsport Academy, 1851, perhaps Iowa's oldest high school
- Presbyterian Church, 1855
- Methodist Parsonage, 1855
- Methodist Church, 1857
- Herman Greef House, 1863
- Greef Dry Goods Store, 1865
- Bentonsport General Store
- Bentonsport Bridge, 1882

The district includes Federal, Gothic Revival, and "Steamboat Gothic" architecture.

A rich history of Bentonsport was compiled by the 1940 Iowa Writers Program, a project of the Work Projects Administration (WPA) during the New Deal era. Written just after Bentonsport's 100th anniversary, and called Bentonsport Memories, it includes a variety of stories, observations, and facts that provide a compelling look into this historic town.
