= Grove Township, Davis County, Iowa =

Grove Township
- Township
- Location in Davis County
- Coordinates: 40°39′03″N 92°21′21″W
- Country: United States
- State: Iowa
- County: Davis

Area
  - Total: 40.67 sq mi (105.34 km^{2})
  - Land: 40.59 sq mi (105.13 km^{2})
  - Water: 0.081 sq mi (0.21 km^{2}) 0.2%
- Elevation: 790 ft (240 m)

Population (2000)
  - Total: 245
  - Density: 6.0/sq mi (2.3/km^{2})
- GNIS feature ID: 0467982

Grove Township is a township in Davis County, Iowa, United States. As of the 2000 census, its population was 245.

== History ==
Grove Township was organized in 1846.

== Geography ==
Grove Township covers an area of 40.67 square miles (105.34 square kilometers); of this, 0.08 square miles (0.21 square kilometers) or 0.2 percent is water.

=== Unincorporated towns ===
- Stiles

(This list is based on USGS data and may include former settlements.)

=== Adjacent townships ===
- Prairie Township (east)
- Roscoe Township (east)
- Wyacondah Township (west)
- Cleveland Township (northwest)

=== Cemeteries ===
The township contains seven cemeteries: Collins, French, Lister, Patterson, Rader, Stiles and Union.
