= Van Buren County, Iowa =

County in Iowa, United States

- County
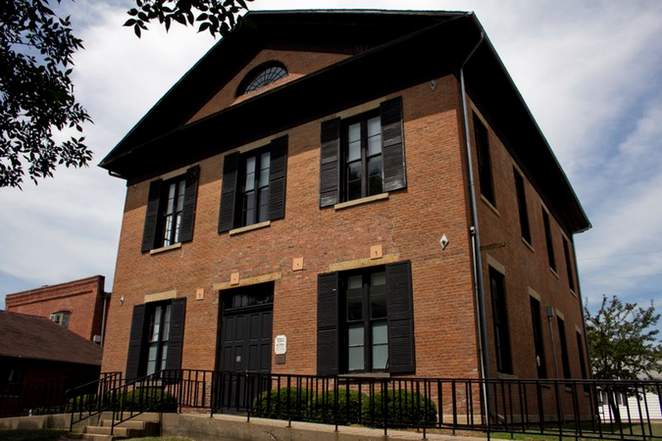
- The Van Buren County Courthouse in Keosauqua

- Location within the U.S. state of Iowa
- Coordinates: 40°45′00″N 91°57′06″W
- Country: United States
- State: Iowa
- Founded: December 7, 1836
- Named for: Martin Van Buren
- Seat: Keosauqua
- Largest city: Keosauqua

Area
  - Total: 491 sq mi (1,270 km^{2})
  - Land: 485 sq mi (1,260 km^{2})
  - Water: 5.7 sq mi (15 km^{2}) 1.2%

Population (2020)
  - Total: 7,203
  - Estimate (2025): 7,131 ▼
  - Density: 14.7/sq mi (5.7/km^{2})
- Time zone: UTC−6 (Central)
  - Summer (DST): UTC−5 (CDT)
- Congressional district: 2nd
- Website: www.vanburencounty.iowa.gov
- Iowa county number 89

Van Buren County (/væn ˈbjʊərən/ van BURE-ən) is a county located in the U.S. state of Iowa. As of the 2020 census the population was 7,203, making it the state's tenth-least populous county. The county seat is Keosauqua, which contains the oldest continuously operational courthouse in Iowa, and second-oldest in the United States.

== History ==
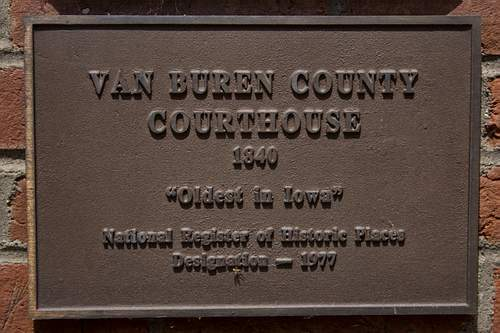
this plaque on the Van Buren County courthouse indicates its age and historic status.

Van Buren County was formed on December 7, 1836, as a part of Wisconsin Territory, and was split off from Des Moines County. It was named for President Martin Van Buren. It became a part of Iowa Territory (later the state of Iowa) when that territory was organized on July 4, 1838.

The county's courthouse was built in September 1843 in the Greek Revival style, and stands as Iowa's oldest, and the nation's second-oldest, courthouse in operation.

"The Honey War" refers to a colorful episode in Van Buren County's history when the State of Missouri and Wisconsin Territory border came into dispute. Missouri attempted to collect taxes from residents north of the disputed Sullivan Line of 1816, which residents said was not rightfully theirs to tax. The sheriff of Van Buren County subsequently arrested and jailed the sheriff from Kahoka, Missouri, and Missourians were charged with "stealing honey from bee trees" in what is now Lacey-Keosauqua State Park. Each governor sent troops to resolve the problem, but no bloodshed resulted. The matter was turned over to the U.S. Congress for arbitration. The dispute, however, was not resolved until 1846, when Iowa became a state. Congress ruled "in favor of Iowa, allowing the original Sullivan line of 1816 to remain intact".

Van Buren County is also home to Iowa's oldest community theater group still in operation, the Van Buren Players, founded in 1963.

== Geography ==
According to the United States Census Bureau, the county has a total area of 491 square miles (1,270 km^{2}), of which 5.7 sq mi (15 km^{2}) (1.2%) are covered by water.

=== Major highways ===
- Iowa Highway 1
- Iowa Highway 2
- Iowa Highway 16
- Iowa Highway 98

=== Adjacent counties ===
- Jefferson County (north)
- Henry County (northeast)
- Lee County (east)
- Clark County, Missouri (southeast)
- Scotland County, Missouri (southwest)
- Davis County (west)

== Demographics ==
Historical population
Census	Pop.	Note	%±
1850	12,270		—
1860	17,081		39.2%
1870	17,672		3.5%
1880	17,043		−3.6%
1890	16,253		−4.6%
1900	17,354		6.8%
1910	15,020		−13.4%
1920	14,060		−6.4%
1930	12,603		−10.4%
1940	12,053		−4.4%
1950	11,007		−8.7%
1960	9,778		−11.2%
1970	8,643		−11.6%
1980	8,626		−0.2%
1990	7,676		−11.0%
2000	7,809		1.7%
2010	7,570		−3.1%
2020	7,203		−4.8%
2025 (est.)	7,131	▼	−1.0%
U.S. Decennial Census:

=== 2020 census ===
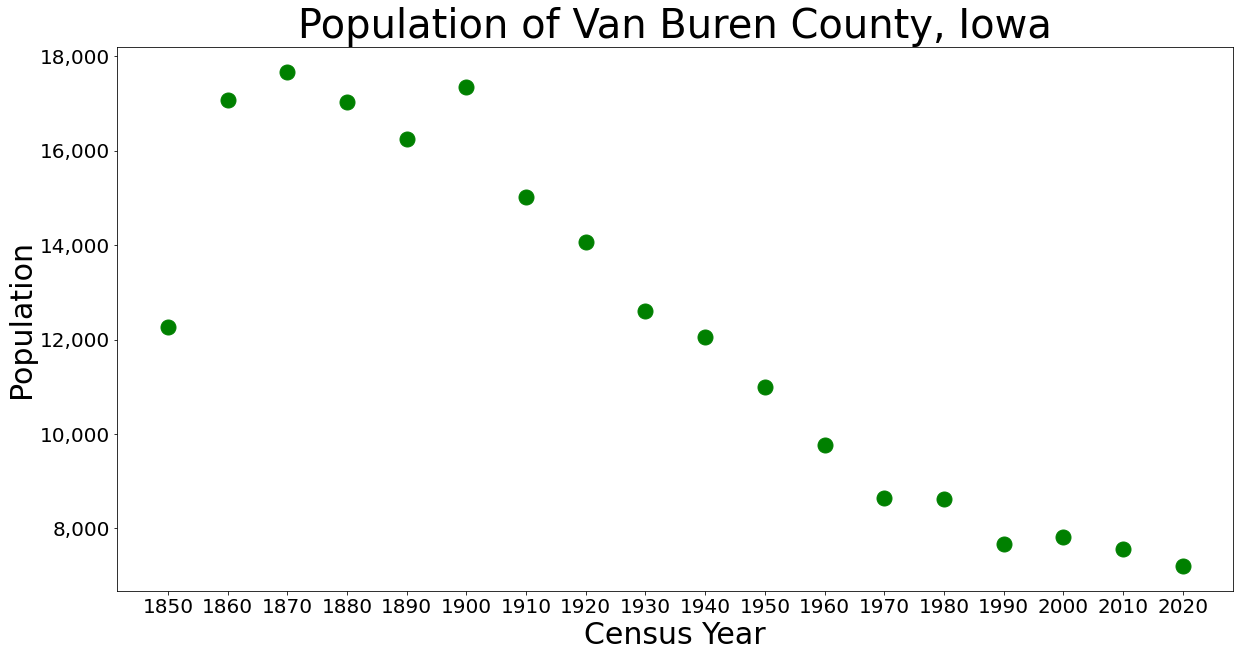
Population of Van Buren County from the U.S. census data

As of the 2020 census, the county had a population of 7,203, a population density of 14.7/sq mi (5.7/km^{2}), and 3,500 housing units.

The median age was 44.4 years, 23.9% of residents were under the age of 18, and 23.0% of residents were 65 years of age or older. For every 100 females there were 106.1 males, and for every 100 females age 18 and over there were 102.0 males age 18 and over.

The racial makeup of the county was 96.1% White, 0.4% Black or African American, 0.1% American Indian and Alaska Native, 0.3% Asian, <0.1% Native Hawaiian and Pacific Islander, 0.3% from some other race, and 2.8% from two or more races. Hispanic or Latino residents of any race comprised 1.6% of the population.

<0.1% of residents lived in urban areas, while 100.0% lived in rural areas.

Of the 3,500 housing units, 2,984 were occupied, leaving a vacancy rate of 14.7%. There were 2,984 households in the county, of which 26.2% had children under the age of 18 living in them. Of all households, 52.7% were married-couple households, 19.9% were households with a male householder and no spouse or partner present, and 20.8% were households with a female householder and no spouse or partner present. About 30.3% of all households were made up of individuals and 17.3% had someone living alone who was 65 years of age or older. Among occupied housing units, 80.3% were owner-occupied and 19.7% were renter-occupied. The homeowner vacancy rate was 2.0% and the rental vacancy rate was 10.8%.

=== 2010 census ===
As of the 2010 census, there were 7,570 people, 3,108 households, and 2,058 families residing in the county. The population density was 15.614/sq mi (6.029/km^{2}) people per square mile. There were 3,670 housing units at an average density of 7.570/sq mi (2.923/km^{2}) per square mile. The racial makeup of the county was 98.3% White, 0.2% Black or African American, 0.1% Native American, 0.5% Asian, 0.2% from other races, and 0.7% from two or more races. 1.2% of the population were Hispanic or Latino of any race.

There were 3,108 households out of which 25.4% had children under the age of 18 living with them, 55.4% were married couples living together, 7.0% had a female householder with no husband present, and 33.8% were non-families. 27.7% of all households were made up of individuals and 33.6% had someone living alone who was 65 years of age or older. The average household size was 2.40 and the average family size was 2.97.

In the county, the population was spread out with 24.1% under the age of 18 and 19.8% who were 65 years of age or older. The median age was 43.3 years. For every 100 females there were 100.6 males.

=== 2000 census ===
As of the 2000 census, there are 7,809 people, 3,181 households, and 2,163 families residing in the county. The population density is 6/km^{2} (16/mi^{2}). There are 3,581 housing units at an average density of 3/km^{2} (7/mi^{2}). The racial makeup of the county is 98.62% White, 0.06% African American, 0.18% Native American, 0.28% Asian, 0.06% Pacific Islander, 0.15% from other races, and 0.64% from two or more races. 0.77% of the population are Hispanic or Latino people of any race.

There are 3,181 households out of which 28.70% have children under the age of 18 living with them, 58.30% are married couples living together, 6.00% have a female householder with no husband present, and 32.00% are non-families. 28.00% of all households are made up of individuals and 15.70% have someone living alone who is 65 years of age or older. The average household size is 2.41 and the average family size is 2.96.

In the county the population is spread out with 24.80% under the age of 18, 7.00% from 18 to 24, 24.40% from 25 to 44, 24.80% from 45 to 64, and 19.10% who are 65 years of age or older. The median age is 41 years. For every 100 females there are 99.50 males. For every 100 females age 18 and over, there are 97.90 males.

The median income for a household in the county is $31,094, and the median income for a family is $36,420. Males have a median income of $27,379 versus $20,925 for females. The per capita income for the county is $15,748. 12.70% of the population and 8.70% of families are below the poverty line. Out of the total people living in poverty, 14.00% are under the age of 18 and 15.60% are 65 or older.

== Communities ==
=== Cities ===
- Birmingham
- Bonaparte
- Cantril
- Farmington
- Keosauqua
- Milton
- Stockport

=== Census-designated places ===
- Douds
- Leando
- Mount Sterling

=== Unincorporated communities ===
- Bentonsport
- Iowaville
- Lebanon
- Mt. Zion
- Pittsburg
- Selma
- Utica
- Vernon
- Winchester

=== Townships ===
According to the 1850 US Census Records.

- Birmingham Township
- Bonaparte Township
- Cedar Township
- Chequest Township
- Des Moines Township
- Farmington Township
- Harrisburg Township
- Jackson Township
- Keosauqua Township
- Lick Creek Township
- Union Township
- Van Buren Township
- Vernon Township
- Village Township
- Washington Township

=== Population ranking ===
The population ranking of the following table is based on the 2020 census of Van Buren County.

† county seat

Rank	City/Town/etc.	Municipal type	Population (2020 Census)
1	† Keosauqua	City	936
2	Farmington	City	579
3	Milton	City	380
4	Birmingham	City	367
5	Bonaparte	City	359
6	Stockport	City	272
7	Cantril	City	224
8	Douds	CDP	156
9	Leando	CDP	121
10	Mount Sterling	CDP	33

== Politics ==
Van Buren County has been predominantly Republican throughout its history, voting for the Democratic candidate only six times in presidential elections from 1896 onward. However, the county was a national bellwether between 1964 and 2004, but voted Republican by wide margins in years the nation went Republican. Aside from Lyndon B. Johnson's landslide victory in 1964, the margins of victory Democrats won the county by in this 40-year period were incredibly narrow, with the difference being less than one hundred votes when Jimmy Carter (being a mere 3 vote margin) & Bill Clinton won the county. From 2000 on, the county has trended strongly Republican, particularly in 2016 where Hillary Clinton received the lowest percentage by a Democratic candidate in 60 years. Clinton also failed to win even 1,000 votes, a feat which every major party candidate prior to 2016 had been able to accomplish in the county.

United States presidential election results for Van Buren County, Iowa
Year	Republican		Democratic		Third party(ies)	
Year	No.	%	No.	%	No.	%
1896	2,478	53.54%	2,076	44.86%	74	1.60%
1900	2,547	56.40%	1,893	41.92%	76	1.68%
1904	2,469	61.51%	1,416	35.28%	129	3.21%
1908	2,133	53.86%	1,730	43.69%	97	2.45%
1912	1,483	39.36%	1,495	39.68%	790	20.97%
1916	1,994	52.52%	1,735	45.69%	68	1.79%
1920	4,321	71.00%	1,682	27.64%	83	1.36%
1924	3,623	60.69%	1,209	20.25%	1,138	19.06%
1928	3,904	66.45%	1,944	33.09%	27	0.46%
1932	2,375	42.56%	3,135	56.17%	71	1.27%
1936	3,535	55.05%	2,804	43.66%	83	1.29%
1940	4,108	62.72%	2,416	36.89%	26	0.40%
1944	3,095	60.43%	1,997	38.99%	30	0.59%
1948	2,702	57.64%	1,917	40.89%	69	1.47%
1952	3,870	70.62%	1,577	28.78%	33	0.60%
1956	3,233	63.79%	1,833	36.17%	2	0.04%
1960	3,129	63.94%	1,760	35.96%	5	0.10%
1964	1,700	39.93%	2,555	60.02%	2	0.05%
1968	2,294	59.29%	1,331	34.40%	244	6.31%
1972	2,272	63.18%	1,268	35.26%	56	1.56%
1976	1,804	49.14%	1,807	49.22%	60	1.63%
1980	2,142	58.21%	1,311	35.63%	227	6.17%
1984	2,138	56.73%	1,606	42.61%	25	0.66%
1988	1,692	50.75%	1,612	48.35%	30	0.90%
1992	1,418	38.22%	1,464	39.46%	828	22.32%
1996	1,460	43.26%	1,536	45.51%	379	11.23%
2000	2,016	56.61%	1,440	40.44%	105	2.95%
2004	2,211	57.64%	1,568	40.88%	57	1.49%
2008	1,986	54.98%	1,546	42.80%	80	2.21%
2012	2,064	57.83%	1,402	39.28%	103	2.89%
2016	2,527	70.96%	845	23.73%	189	5.31%
2020	2,859	75.42%	875	23.08%	57	1.50%
2024	2,785	76.83%	778	21.46%	62	1.71%

== Education ==
School districts include:

- Cardinal Community School District
- Davis County Community School District
- Fairfield Community School District
- Mount Pleasant Community School District
- Van Buren County Community School District

Former school districts:

- Harmony Community School District

== See also ==
- National Register of Historic Places listings in Van Buren County, Iowa
