= Bonaparte Township, Van Buren County, Iowa =

Township in Van Buren County, Iowa, U.S.

Coordinates: 40°42′N 91°47′W

Bonaparte Township is a township in Van Buren County, Iowa, United States. The population was reported as 517 in 2024, with an average age of 43.9.
