= Mount Sterling, Iowa =

- Census-designated place
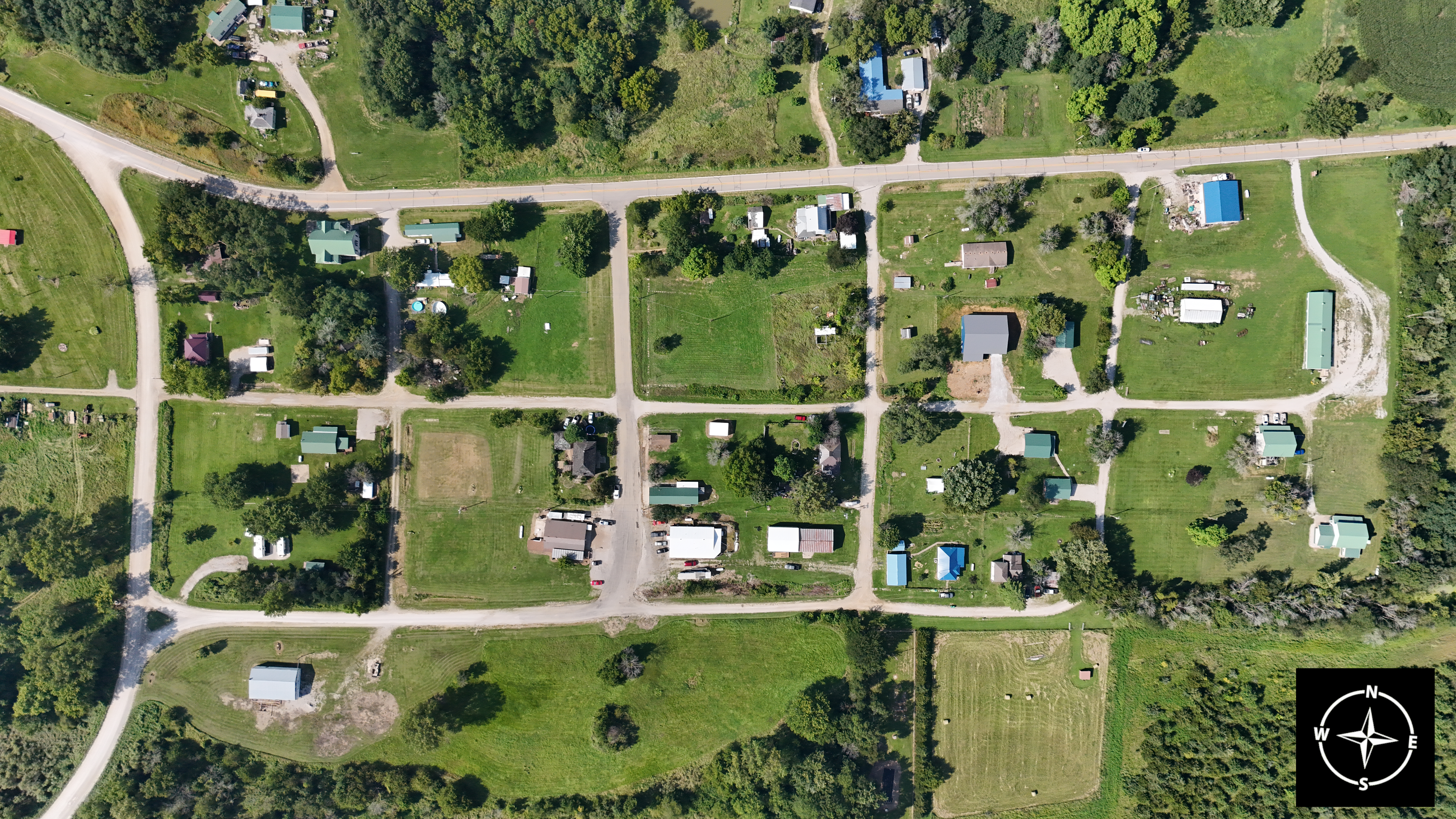
- An aerial view of Mount Sterling, taken on 16 August 2024

- Location of Mount Sterling, Iowa
- Coordinates: 40°37′05″N 91°56′12″W
- Country: USA
- State: Iowa
- County: Van Buren

Area
  - Total: 0.32 sq mi (0.82 km^{2})
  - Land: 0.32 sq mi (0.82 km^{2})
  - Water: 0 sq mi (0.00 km^{2})
- Elevation: 643 ft (196 m)

Population (2020)
  - Total: 33
  - Density: 104.8/sq mi (40.46/km^{2})
- Time zone: UTC-6 (Central (CST))
  - Summer (DST): UTC-5 (CDT)
- ZIP code: 52573
- Area code: 319
- FIPS code: 19-54750
- GNIS feature ID: 2395126

Mount Sterling is a census-designated place (CDP) in Van Buren County, Iowa, United States. The population was 33 at the 2020 census.

== History ==
Mount Sterling was first settled in the late 1830s when George and Horace Wood established a sawmill and corn-cracker to serve the small farms of southern Van Buren County and the northern portion of nearby Scotland County, Missouri. Within a decade the Woods were joined by several other businesses. At first, the small village had no official name and was often referred to as "Dogtown" by the early residents. This came from the fact that nearly every farmer who came to the mill brought at least two or three dogs along, and also from the fact that Horace Wood had three hounds who loved to devour the corn meal as it left the grinder.

Other early names for the village were Wood's Mill and Union Corners until finally Mount Sterling was selected. A steam-powered flour mill was erected in 1855, but the lack of business forced ts closure and relocation to Keokuk, Iowa in 1861. Other industry and business included a distillery, a second sawmill, a barrel hoop factory, a blacksmith, several general mercantile stores, a shoemaker and a lumber yard. In addition to establishing the first sawmill, George Wood also built and operated the town's first inn and served as the area's first postmaster. The first child born in the town was to Dr Joel Knight, a purveyor of a patent medicine product known as "Dr Joel Knight's Celebrated Screw Auger Pills." The first school was built in the area in 1841.

Mount Sterling never exceeded more than 300 residents. After incorporation in 1907, the town reported a peak population of 232 souls in the 1910 U.S. Census. The population of the town and surrounding farms continued to dwindle throughout the 20th century, particularly after World War II, leading to business closures. Mount Sterling became something of a bedroom community with residents forced to find work in larger area towns like Keosauqua, Keokuk, and Fairfield Iowa. Current-day Mount Sterling has only two businesses, a bar & grill and an auto repair shop, and a hunting lodge. The town made national news in 2003 after then-Mayor Jo Hamlett proposed an ordinance that would fine residents and visitors for lying. Although in made in jest, the proposal pointed out the chronic lack of cash in a town whose yearly budget never exceeded $5,000. The story of the ordinance was covered by news outlets as far away as Australia.

In April 2012 the Mount Sterling city council voted to disband the town, the first Iowa town to take such a step since 2005. No candidates filed to run for Mayor or city council in the November 2011 election, prompting the vote to become an unincorporated area of Van Buren County. The county government will take over all street maintenance and the towns street lights will be discontinued. The towns' sewer system will continue to be operated by the county. The city officially became unincorporated on November 11, 2012, when the Community Development Board of the Iowa Economic Development Authority voted unanimously to accept the city's resolution of discontinuance.

== Geography ==
Mount Sterling is located in south-central Van Buren County less than one mile north of the Iowa-Missouri border. The Fox River flows past the southwest side of the community and the Fox River Water Management Area is adjacent to the south.

According to the United States Census Bureau, the city has a total area of 0.40 square miles (1.04 km^{2}), all land.

== Demographics ==
Historical populations
Year	Pop.	±%
1910	232	—
1920	179	−22.8%
1930	165	−7.8%
1940	134	−18.8%
1950	144	+7.5%
1960	86	−40.3%
1970	87	+1.2%
1980	96	+10.3%
1990	53	−44.8%
2000	40	−24.5%
2010	36	−10.0%
2020	33	−8.3%
Source:"U.S. Census website". United States Census Bureau. and Iowa Data Center; Source: U.S. Decennial Census

=== 2020 census ===
As of the census of 2020, there were 33 people, 17 households, and 8 families residing in the community. The population density was 104.8 inhabitants per square mile (40.5/km^{2}). There were 20 housing units at an average density of 63.5 per square mile (24.5/km^{2}). The racial makeup of the community was 100.0% White, 0.0% Black or African American, 0.0% Native American, 0.0% Asian, 0.0% Pacific Islander, 0.0% from other races and 0.0% from two or more races. Hispanic or Latino persons of any race comprised 0.0% of the population.

Of the 17 households, 35.3% of which had children under the age of 18 living with them, 47.1% were married couples living together, 0.0% were cohabitating couples, 23.5% had a female householder with no spouse or partner present and 29.4% had a male householder with no spouse or partner present. 52.9% of all households were non-families. 52.9% of all households were made up of individuals, 29.4% had someone living alone who was 65 years old or older.

The median age in the community was 54.5 years. 24.2% of the residents were under the age of 20; 3.0% were between the ages of 20 and 24; 18.2% were from 25 and 44; 33.3% were from 45 and 64; and 21.2% were 65 years of age or older. The gender makeup of the community was 54.5% male and 45.5% female.

=== 2010 census ===
As of the census of 2010, there were 36 people, 16 households, and 10 families residing in the city. The population density was 90.0 inhabitants per square mile (34.7/km^{2}). There were 20 housing units at an average density of 50.0 per square mile (19.3/km^{2}). The racial makeup of the city was 100.0% White.

There were 16 households, of which 31.3% had children under the age of 18 living with them, 43.8% were married couples living together, 12.5% had a female householder with no husband present, 6.3% had a male householder with no wife present, and 37.5% were non-families. 18.8% of all households were made up of individuals. The average household size was 2.25 and the average family size was 2.60.

The median age in the city was 47.5 years. 16.7% of residents were under the age of 18; 2.8% were between the ages of 18 and 24; 25.1% were from 25 to 44; 47.1% were from 45 to 64; and 8.3% were 65 years of age or older. The gender makeup of the city was 55.6% male and 44.4% female.

=== 2000 census ===
As of the census of 2000, there were 40 people, 16 households, and 11 families residing in the city. The population density was 100.0 inhabitants per square mile (38.6/km^{2}). There were 22 housing units at an average density of 55.0 per square mile (21.2/km^{2}). The racial makeup of the city was 97.50% White and 2.50% Native American.

There were 16 households, out of which 18.8% had children under the age of 18 living with them, 62.5% were married couples living together, and 31.3% were non-families. 25.0% of all households were made up of individuals, and 18.8% had someone living alone who was 65 years of age or older. The average household size was 2.50 and the average family size was 3.00.

In the city, the population was spread out, with 20.0% under the age of 18, 32.5% from 25 to 44, 35.0% from 45 to 64, and 12.5% who were 65 years of age or older. The median age was 43 years. For every 100 females, there were 90.5 males. For every 100 females age 18 and over, there were 128.6 males.

The median income for a household in the city was $31,250, and the median income for a family was $34,375. Males had a median income of $27,188 versus $19,375 for females. The per capita income for the city was $10,072. There were no families and 3.3% of the population living below the poverty line, including no under eighteens and 100.0% of those over 64.

== See also ==
- List of discontinued cities in Iowa
