= Vernon Township, Van Buren County, Iowa =

Township in Van Buren County, Iowa, U.S.

Coordinates: 40°39′N 91°53′W

Vernon Township is a township in Van Buren County, Iowa, United States.
