= Solon, Iowa =

- City
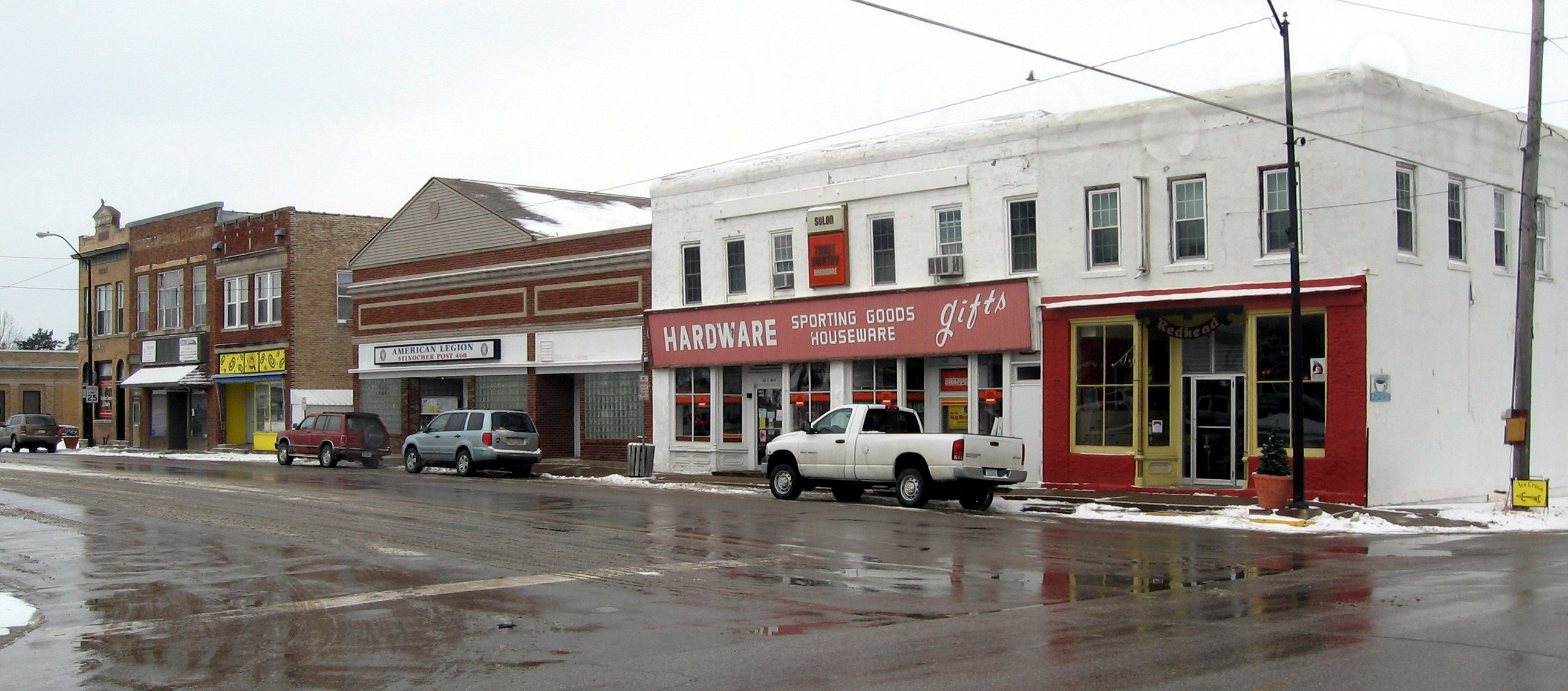
- Buildings on East Main Street in downtown Solon

- Seal
- Motto: A Place to Put Down Roots
- Location of Solon in the state of Iowa
- Coordinates: 41°48′29″N 91°30′20″W
- Country: United States
- State: Iowa
- County: Johnson
- Incorporated: April 28, 1877

Government
  - Type: Mayor-council government

Area
  - Total: 1.32 sq mi (3.43 km^{2})
  - Land: 1.32 sq mi (3.43 km^{2})
  - Water: 0 sq mi (0.00 km^{2})
- Elevation: 768 ft (234 m)

Population (2020)
  - Total: 3,018
  - Density: 2,277.8/sq mi (879.46/km^{2})
- Time zone: UTC-6 (Central)
  - Summer (DST): UTC-5 (Central)
- ZIP code: 52333
- Area code: 319
- FIPS code: 19-73875
- GNIS feature ID: 2395909
- Website: www.solon-iowa.com

Solon is a city located in Johnson County, Iowa, United States. Part of the Iowa City, Iowa Metropolitan Statistical Area, it is located a few miles from Lake MacBride State Park and the larger cities of Coralville and Iowa City. The population was 3,018 at the time of the 2020 census.

== History ==
Solon was platted in 1840. It is named for the classical Athenian statesman, lawmaker, and lyric poet Solon. Ironically, the local high school's mascot is the Spartans; Sparta was famously an enemy of Athens, Solon's home. The National Register of Historic Places-listed Stone Academy is just north of town.

== Geography ==
According to the United States Census Bureau, the city has a total area of 1.39 square miles (3.60 km^{2}), all land.

Jordan Creek flows through the city.

== Demographics ==
Historical populations
Year	Pop.	±%
1880	383	—
1890	353	−7.8%
1900	397	+12.5%
1910	450	+13.4%
1920	471	+4.7%
1930	493	+4.7%
1940	515	+4.5%
1950	527	+2.3%
1960	604	+14.6%
1970	837	+38.6%
1980	969	+15.8%
1990	1,050	+8.4%
2000	1,177	+12.1%
2010	2,037	+73.1%
2020	3,018	+48.2%
Source:"U.S. Census website". United States Census Bureau. and Iowa Data Center; Source: U.S. Decennial Census

=== 2020 census ===
As of the 2020 census, there were 3,018 people, 1,067 households, and 738 families residing in the city. The population density was 2,277.8 inhabitants per square mile (879.5/km^{2}). There were 1,126 housing units at an average density of 849.8 per square mile (328.1/km^{2}).

The median age in the city was 37.5 years. 30.2% of residents were under the age of 18 and 16.5% were 65 years of age or older. The age distribution was 4.2% from 20 to 24, 25.3% from 25 to 44, and 21.7% from 45 to 64. The gender makeup of the city was 48.4% male and 51.6% female. For every 100 females there were 94.0 males, and for every 100 females age 18 and over there were 88.9 males.

Of the 1,067 households, 42.0% had children under the age of 18 living with them. Of all households, 54.3% were married-couple households, 5.7% were cohabiting-couple households, 14.8% had a male householder with no spouse or partner present, and 25.2% had a female householder with no spouse or partner present. Non-families made up 30.8% of all households. About 26.1% of all households were made up of individuals, and 14.3% had someone living alone who was 65 years of age or older.

Of the 1,126 housing units, 5.2% were vacant. The homeowner vacancy rate was 1.2% and the rental vacancy rate was 5.5%.

0.0% of residents lived in urban areas, while 100.0% lived in rural areas.

Racial composition as of the 2020 census
Race	Number	Percent
White	2,879	95.4%
Black or African American	11	0.4%
American Indian and Alaska Native	0	0.0%
Asian	15	0.5%
Native Hawaiian and Other Pacific Islander	0	0.0%
Some other race	14	0.5%
Two or more races	99	3.3%
Hispanic or Latino (of any race)	52	1.7%

=== 2010 census ===
As of the census of 2010, there were 2,037 people, 759 households, and 528 families living in the city. The population density was 1,465.5 inhabitants per square mile (565.8/km^{2}). There were 832 housing units at an average density of 598.6 per square mile (231.1/km^{2}). The racial makeup of the city was 97.8% White, 0.3% African American, 0.3% Asian, 0.6% from other races, and 0.8% from two or more races. Hispanic or Latino of any race were 1.5% of the population.

There were 759 households, of which 46.2% had children under the age of 18 living with them, 55.5% were married couples living together, 9.7% had a female householder with no husband present, 4.3% had a male householder with no wife present, and 30.4% were non-families. 26.4% of all households were made up of individuals, and 10.3% had someone living alone who was 65 years of age or older. The average household size was 2.60 and the average family size was 3.17.

The median age in the city was 35.4 years. 32.2% of residents were under the age of 18; 4.4% were between the ages of 18 and 24; 29% were from 25 to 44; 20.9% were from 45 to 64; and 13.5% were 65 years of age or older. The gender makeup of the city was 48.3% male and 51.7% female.

=== 2000 census ===
As of the census of 2000, there were 1,177 people, 457 households, and 304 families living in the city. The population density was 887.1 inhabitants per square mile (342.5/km^{2}). There were 496 housing units at an average density of 373.8 per square mile (144.3/km^{2}). The racial makeup of the city was 98.73% White, 0.25% African American, 0.08% Native American, 0.25% Pacific Islander, 0.17% from other races, and 0.51% from two or more races. Hispanic or Latino of any race were 0.17% of the population.

There were 457 households, out of which 37.6% had children under the age of 18 living with them, 54.3% were married couples living together, 9.0% had a female householder with no husband present, and 33.3% were non-families. 28.9% of all households were made up of individuals, and 12.5% had someone living alone who was 65 years of age or older. The average household size was 2.43 and the average family size was 3.04.

26.2% are under the age of 18, 7.4% from 18 to 24, 30.1% from 25 to 44, 18.5% from 45 to 64, and 17.8% who were 65 years of age or older. The median age was 38 years. For every 100 females, there were 97.8 males. For every 100 females age 18 and over, there were 86.1 males.

The median income for a household in the city was $46,953, and the median income for a family was $58,289. Males had a median income of $38,352 versus $26,111 for females. The per capita income for the city was $18,029. About 0.3% of families and 2.3% of the population were below the poverty line, including 0.6% of those under age 18 and 1.5% of those age 65 or over.

== Architecture ==
- Saints Peter and Paul Catholic Church (1916-1917), National Register of Historic Places

== Education ==
The Solon area is served by the Solon Community School District.

== Notable people ==
- Leo Beranek, acoustics expert involved in the improvement of the Hush-a-Phone
- Lisa Bluder, former NCAA women's basketball head coach resides in Solon
- Tyler Linderbaum, American football player
- Robin Lord Taylor, actor/director
- Cam Miller, American football player
