= Lake Macbride State Park =

State park in Johnson County, Iowa, United States

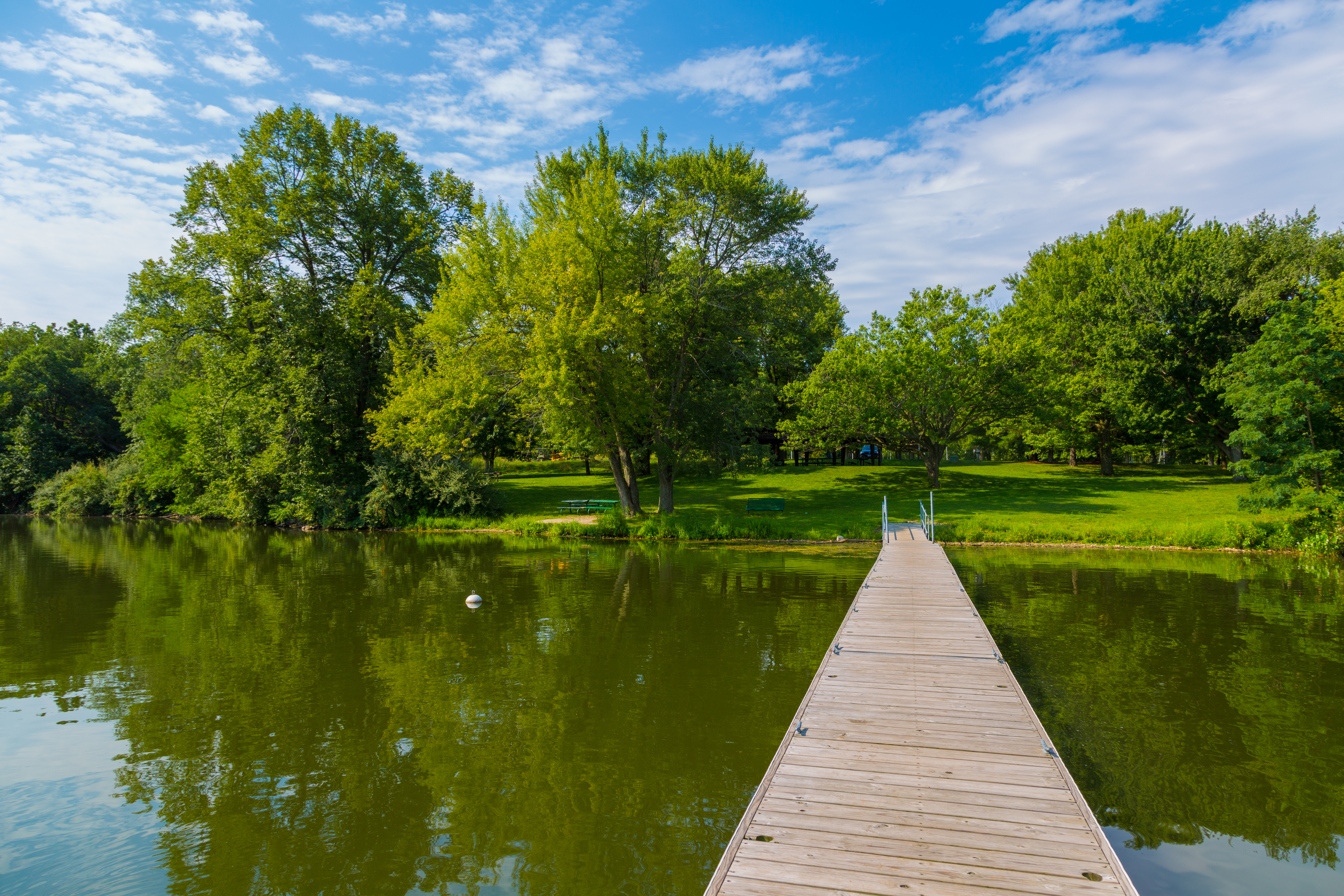

- Location within Iowa Location within the United States
- Location: Johnson County, Iowa, United States
- Nearest city: Solon, Iowa
- Coordinates: 41°48′19″N 91°33′38″W
- Area: 2,180 acres (880 ha)
- Elevation: 712 ft (217 m)
- Established: 1937
- Administrator: Iowa Department of Natural Resources
- Named for: Thomas Huston Macbride
- Website: Official website

Lake Macbride State Park is a 2,180-acre (880 ha) state park in Johnson County, Iowa, United States, located near the city of Solon. The park is composed of two units centered on the 900-acre (360 ha) Lake Macbride. Both the park and the lake are named for Iowa conservationist Thomas Huston Macbride.

Lake Macbride is a popular fishing site; the rare spotted bass can be found in the lake, and it is also home to muskellunge, walleye, and channel catfish. The park provides an accessible fishing dock, twelve jetties, and a 24-hour fishing area for fishers along with seven boat ramps and a boat rental facility. The latter also houses a concession stand and is near the park's beach. The park also features 7 miles (11 km) of hiking and multi-use trails, which travel through forests and restored prairie; one trail connects the park with Solon, while another links the beach and Lake Macbride's dam. Other facilities at the park include a modern campground with electric campsites, a primitive campground, and a day use lodge.

On September 22, 2026, a 5th-grade student and his teacher drowned in Lake Macbride while on a field trip from Borlaug Elementary School in Iowa City.
