= Chequest Township, Van Buren County, Iowa =

Township in Van Buren County, Iowa, U.S.

Coordinates: 40°46′N 92°07′W

Chequest Township is a township in Van Buren County, Iowa, United States.
