= Jackson Township, Van Buren County, Iowa =

Township in Van Buren County, Iowa, U.S.

Coordinates: 40°40′N 92°07′W

Jackson Township is a township in Van Buren County, Iowa, United States.
