= Lick Creek Township, Van Buren County, Iowa =

Township in Van Buren County, Iowa, U.S.

Coordinates: 40°51′N 92°00′W

Lick Creek Township is a township in Van Buren County, Iowa, United States.
