= Vernon, Iowa =

- Unincorporated community
- Location within Iowa
- Coordinates: 40°43′21″N 91°51′19″W
- Country: United States
- State: Iowa
- County: Van Buren
- Elevation: 564 ft (172 m)
- Time zone: UTC-6 (Central (CST))
  - Summer (DST): UTC-5 (CDT)
- GNIS feature ID: 462552

Vernon is an unincorporated community in Van Buren County, in the U.S. state of Iowa.

== Geography ==
The community is across the Des Moines River from Bentonsport. The community is in sections 1 and 2 of Henry Township, south of the Des Moines River.

== History ==
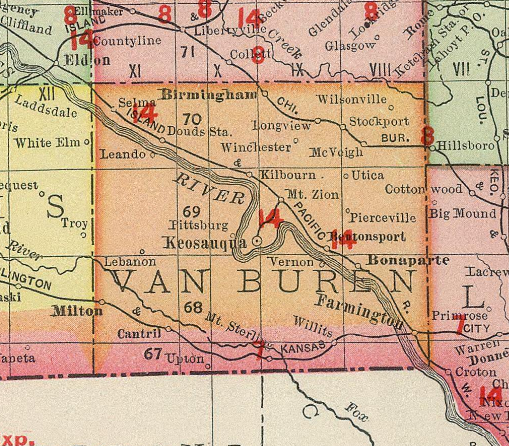
Vernon in Van Buren County Iowa in 1903

Van Buren was platted on June 12, 1837, by Henry Smith, John Smith, S.C. Reed, and Isaac Reed. The community was originally known as South Bentonsport, as it lay on the south side of the Des Moines River, across from Bentonsport. According to The Annals of Iowa, Vernon was probably named in honor of Mount Vernon, the home of George Washington.

During the early years, a ferry provided connection between Vernon and Bentonsport over the Des Moines.

A grist mill was built in Vernon in 1845. This mill was later used as a wool mill and then a flour mill. A pottery opened in Vernon in 1848. The Methodist Episcopal Church of Vernon opened in 1856.

The Vernon post office opened in 1853. By the 1870s, a hotel and blacksmith shop were also located in Vernon. Vernon School District #5 was formed.

The population of Vernon was 386 in 1902. The Vernon post office closed in 1903.

Vernon's population was 78 in 1925.

== See also ==
- Winchester, Iowa
