= Douds, Iowa =

- CDP
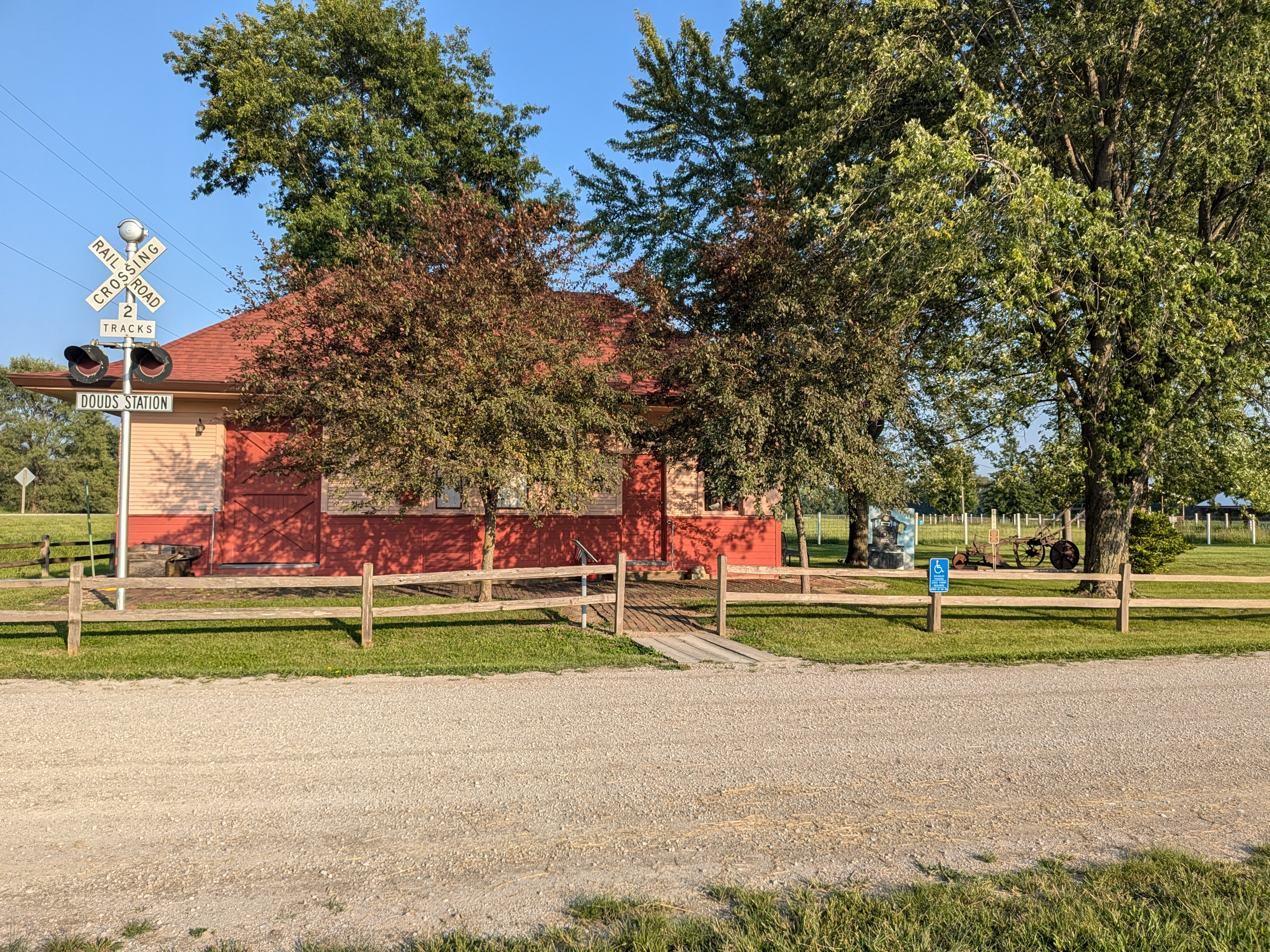
- An old train station in Douds

- Location of Douds, Iowa
- Coordinates: 40°50′22″N 92°5′8″W
- Country: USA
- State: Iowa
- County: Van Buren

Area
  - Total: 2.31 sq mi (5.99 km^{2})
  - Land: 2.21 sq mi (5.73 km^{2})
  - Water: 0.10 sq mi (0.26 km^{2})
- Elevation: 712 ft (217 m)

Population (2020)
  - Total: 156
  - Density: 70.5/sq mi (27.23/km^{2})
- Time zone: UTC-6 (Central (CST))
  - Summer (DST): UTC-5 (CDT)
- ZIP code: 52551
- Area code: 641
- FIPS code: 19-22035
- GNIS feature ID: 2393398

Douds is a census-designated place (CDP) in Van Buren County, Iowa, United States. The population was 156 at the 2020 census.

== History ==
Douds was platted in 1866 by brothers Eliab and David Doud. It was originally called Doud's Station. Douds was never officially incorporated as a town, but has a Post Office and its own zip code. On the southern bank of the Des Moines River lies Douds' "Twin City", Leando. Leando is the elder, but smaller of the two towns. Leando was settled in the 1830s and was originally called Portland. In the original deed it was stipulated by the Doud brothers that there was to be no buying or selling of intoxicating liquors in the town.

This was upheld until the 1990s when Rob Moore began selling alcohol in his grocery store. Until the construction of the first iron bridge (1898) the towns of Douds and Portland saw much rivalry. Douds is home to Douds Stone Inc. which operates from one of the largest underground limestone mines in the state of Iowa. Farmers and Traders Savings Bank (founded 1910) is located in Douds, and is one of the few banks to survive the Great Depression. Now considered one community, (Douds and Leando) Douds hosts its annual Field Day on the last full weekend in June.

The population was 216 in 1940.

== Geography ==
Douds is located in the Northwestern portion of Van Buren County.

According to the United States Census Bureau, the CDP has a total area of 2.3 square miles (6.0 km^{2}), of which 2.2 square miles (5.7 km^{2}) is land and 0.1 square miles (0.26 km^{2}) (3.91%) is water.

== Demographics ==
Historical population
| Census | Pop. | Note | %± |
|---|---|---|---|
| 2010 | 152 | | — |
| 2020 | 156 | | 2.6% |
U.S. Decennial Census

=== 2020 census ===
As of the census of 2020, there were 156 people, 79 households, and 46 families residing in the community. The population density was 70.5 inhabitants per square mile (27.2/km^{2}). There were 90 housing units at an average density of 40.7 per square mile (15.7/km^{2}). The racial makeup of the community was 92.9% White, 0.0% Black or African American, 0.6% Native American, 0.0% Asian, 0.0% Pacific Islander, 0.0% from other races and 6.4% from two or more races. Hispanic or Latino persons of any race comprised 1.9% of the population.

Of the 79 households, 10.1% of which had children under the age of 18 living with them, 45.6% were married couples living together, 6.3% were cohabitating couples, 16.5% had a female householder with no spouse or partner present and 31.6% had a male householder with no spouse or partner present. 41.8% of all households were non-families. 35.4% of all households were made up of individuals, 12.7% had someone living alone who was 65 years old or older.

The median age in the community was 44.0 years. 22.4% of the residents were under the age of 20; 11.5% were between the ages of 20 and 24; 16.7% were from 25 and 44; 36.5% were from 45 and 64; and 12.8% were 65 years of age or older. The gender makeup of the community was 65.4% male and 34.6% female.

=== 2000 census ===
As of the census of 2000, there were 165 people, 81 households, and 46 families residing in the CDP. The population density was 74.7 inhabitants per square mile (28.8/km^{2}). There were 90 housing units at an average density of 40.8 per square mile (15.8/km^{2}). The racial makeup of the CDP was 98.79% White and 1.21% Asian.

There were 81 households, out of which 24.7% had children under the age of 18 living with them, 50.6% were married couples living together, and 43.2% were non-families. 40.7% of all households were made up of individuals, and 27.2% had someone living alone who was 65 years of age or older. The average household size was 2.04 and the average family size was 2.76.

In the CDP, the population was spread out, with 21.8% under the age of 18, 6.1% from 18 to 24, 22.4% from 25 to 44, 23.6% from 45 to 64, and 26.1% who were 65 years of age or older. The median age was 45 years. For every 100 females, there were 94.1 males. For every 100 females age 18 and over, there were 89.7 males.

The median income for a household in the CDP was $25,893, and the median income for a family was $46,250. Males had a median income of $28,750 versus $33,958 for females. The per capita income for the CDP was $17,428. None of the families and 16.8% of the population were living below the poverty line, including no under eighteens and 38.5% of those over 64.

== Education ==
The community is within the Van Buren County Community School District; It operates the Douds Elementary Attendance Center, located next to the Leando CDP.

The former Van Buren Community School District once included Douds in its boundary, and accordingly operated the school, then known as Douds Elementary School. The district merged into Van Buren County CSD on July 1, 2019.
