= Leando, Iowa =

- CDP
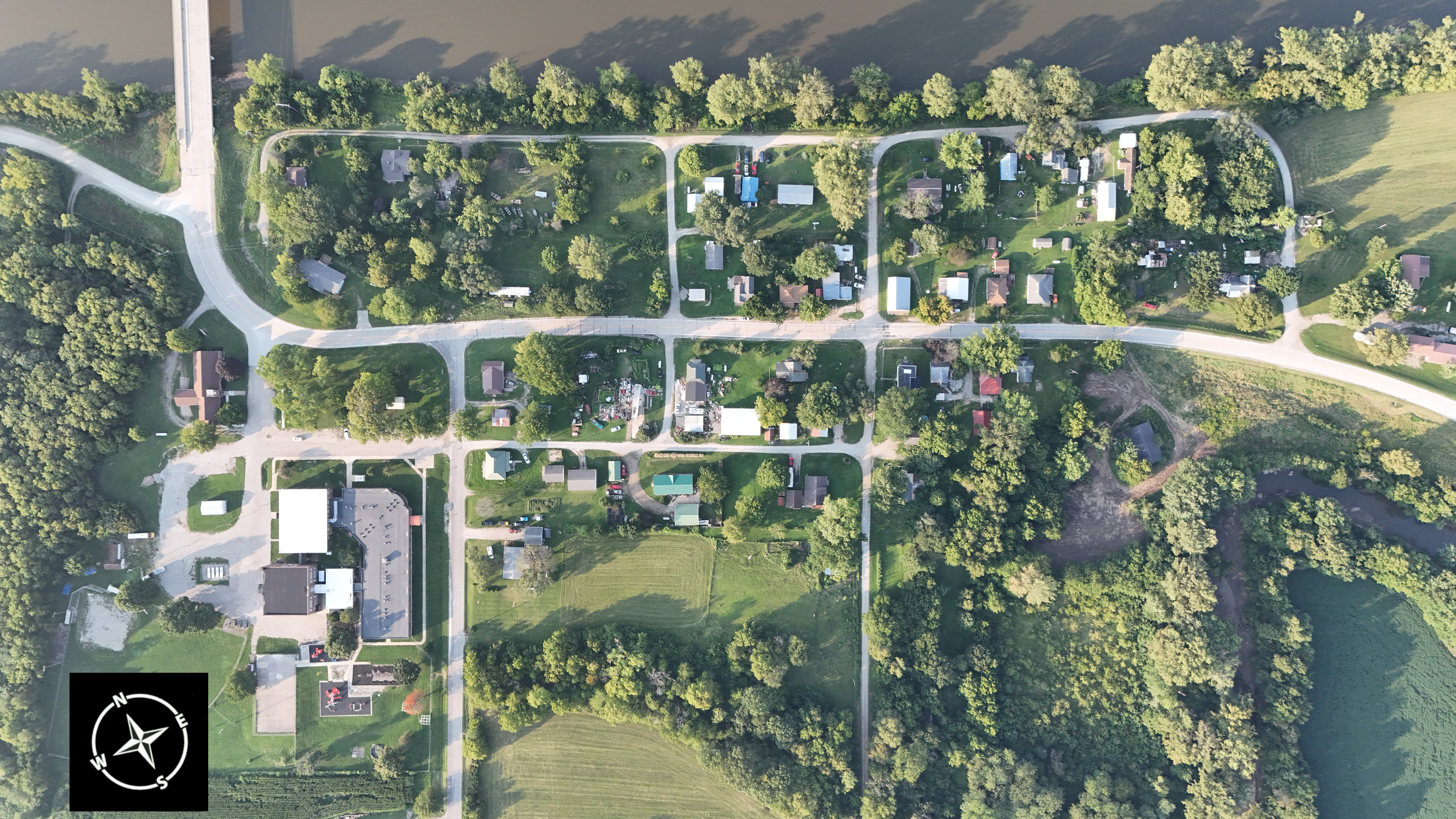
- An aerial photograph of Leando, taken on 16 August 2024. The Des Moines River is seen at the top of the image.

- Location of Leando, Iowa
- Coordinates: 40°49′25″N 92°04′56″W
- Country: USA
- State: Iowa
- County: Van Buren

Area
  - Total: 2.33 sq mi (6.03 km^{2})
  - Land: 2.20 sq mi (5.71 km^{2})
  - Water: 0.12 sq mi (0.32 km^{2})
- Elevation: 637 ft (194 m)

Population (2020)
  - Total: 121
  - Density: 54.9/sq mi (21.18/km^{2})
- Time zone: UTC-6 (Central (CST))
  - Summer (DST): UTC-5 (CDT)
- ZIP code: 52551
- Area code: 641
- FIPS code: 19-43950
- GNIS feature ID: 2393094

Leando is a census-designated place (CDP) in Van Buren County, Iowa, United States. The population was 121 at the 2020 census.

== Geography ==
According to the United States Census Bureau, the CDP has a total area of 2.1 square miles (5.4 km^{2}), of which 2.0 square miles (5.2 km^{2}) is land and 0.1 square miles (0.26 km^{2}) (4.35%) is water.

== Demographics ==
Historical population
Census	Pop.	Note	%±
2000	135		—
2010	115		−14.8%
2020	121		5.2%
U.S. Decennial Census

=== 2020 census ===
As of the census of 2020, there were 121 people, 54 households, and 36 families residing in the community. The population density was 54.9 inhabitants per square mile (21.2/km^{2}). There were 60 housing units at an average density of 27.2 per square mile (10.5/km^{2}). The racial makeup of the community was 96.7% White, 0.0% Black or African American, 0.0% Native American, 0.8% Asian, 0.0% Pacific Islander, 0.0% from other races and 2.5% from two or more races. Hispanic or Latino persons of any race comprised 2.5% of the population.

Of the 54 households, 22.2% of which had children under the age of 18 living with them, 59.3% were married couples living together, 3.7% were cohabitating couples, 7.4% had a female householder with no spouse or partner present and 29.6% had a male householder with no spouse or partner present. 33.3% of all households were non-families. 27.8% of all households were made up of individuals, 16.7% had someone living alone who was 65 years old or older.

The median age in the community was 44.3 years. 24.0% of the residents were under the age of 20; 4.1% were between the ages of 20 and 24; 23.1% were from 25 and 44; 34.7% were from 45 and 64; and 14.0% were 65 years of age or older. The gender makeup of the community was 58.7% male and 41.3% female.

=== 2000 census ===
As of the census of 2000, there were 135 people, 52 households, and 38 families residing in the CDP. The population density was 68.5 inhabitants per square mile (26.4/km^{2}). There were 54 housing units at an average density of 27.4 per square mile (10.6/km^{2}). The racial makeup of the CDP was 100.00% White.

There were 52 households, out of which 28.8% had children under the age of 18 living with them, 63.5% were married couples living together, 7.7% had a female householder with no husband present, and 26.9% were non-families. 25.0% of all households were made up of individuals, and 17.3% had someone living alone who was 65 years of age or older. The average household size was 2.60 and the average family size was 3.13.

In the CDP, the population was spread out, with 23.0% under the age of 18, 10.4% from 18 to 24, 24.4% from 25 to 44, 23.7% from 45 to 64, and 18.5% who were 65 years of age or older. The median age was 39 years. For every 100 females, there were 92.9 males. For every 100 females age 18 and over, there were 112.2 males.

The median income for a household in the CDP was $36,875, and the median income for a family was $36,250. Males had a median income of $25,938 versus $18,750 for females. The per capita income for the CDP was $17,097. There were no families and 5.7% of the population living below the poverty line, including no under eighteens and none of those over 64.

== Education ==
The community is within the Van Buren County Community School District; It operates the Douds Elementary Attendance Center, located next to the Leando CDP.

The former Van Buren Community School District once included Douds in its boundary, and accordingly operated the school, then known as Douds Elementary School. The district merged into Van Buren County CSD on July 1, 2019.
