= Birmingham, Iowa =

- City
- Motto: "Gateway to Scenic Van Buren County"
- Location of Birmingham, Iowa
- Coordinates: 40°52′31″N 91°56′50″W
- Country: United States
- State: Iowa
- County: Van Buren

Area
  - Total: 1.02 sq mi (2.63 km^{2})
  - Land: 1.02 sq mi (2.63 km^{2})
  - Water: 0.0039 sq mi (0.01 km^{2})
- Elevation: 755 ft (230 m)

Population (2020)
  - Total: 367
  - Density: 362.0/sq mi (139.75/km^{2})
- Time zone: UTC-6 (Central (CST))
  - Summer (DST): UTC-5 (CDT)
- ZIP code: 52535
- Area code: 319
- FIPS code: 19-06625
- GNIS feature ID: 2394174
- Website: The Villages of Van Buren, Iowa Website

Birmingham is a city in Van Buren County, Iowa, United States. The population was 367 at the 2020 census.

== History ==
Birmingham was laid out in 1839. The town was incorporated on May 20, 1856.

== Geography ==
According to the United States Census Bureau, the city has a total area of 1.06 square miles (2.75 km^{2}), all land.

== Demographics ==
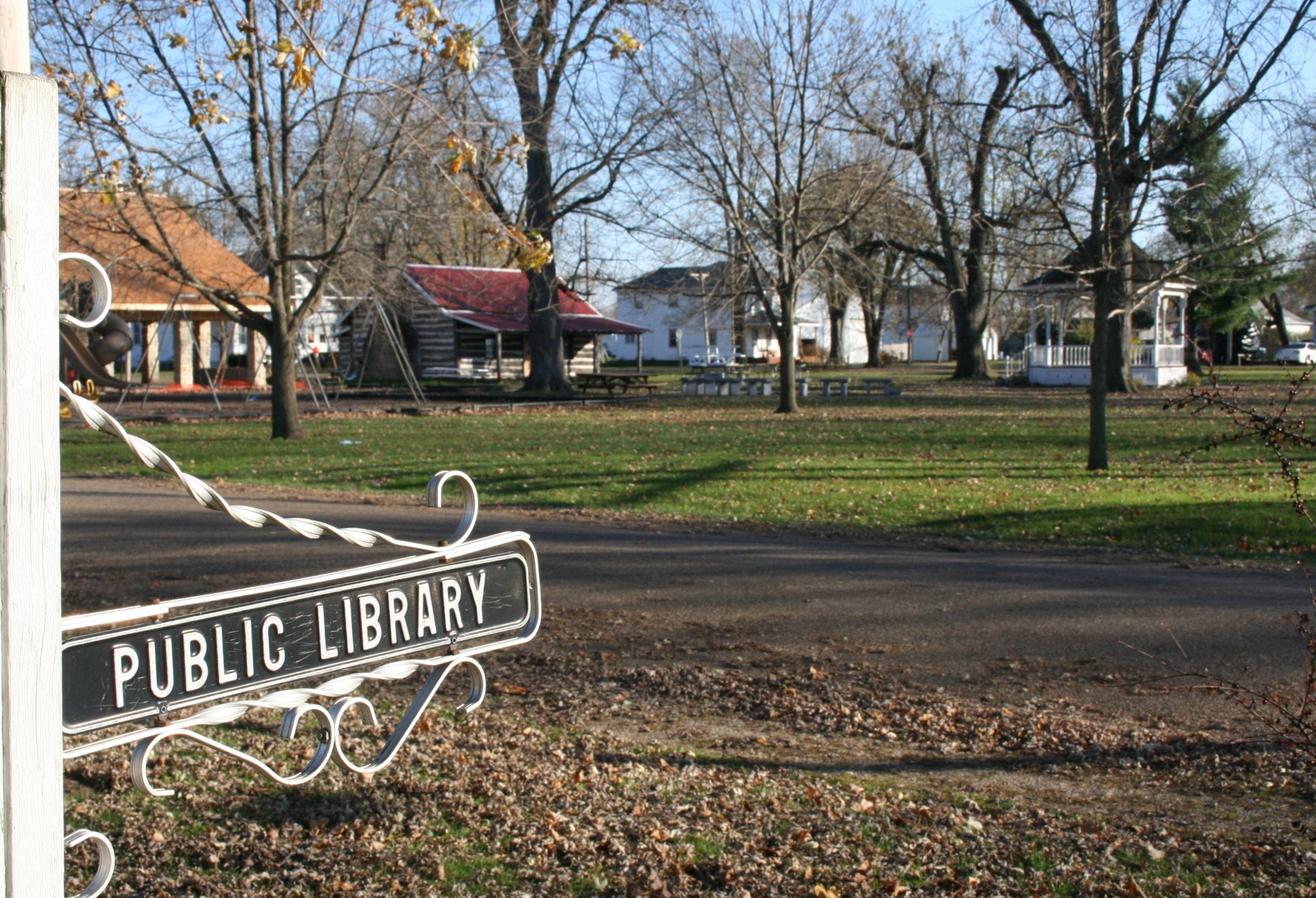
Central City Square showing public park and playground, Birmingham, Iowa, looking southeast from the Public Library.

Historical populations
| Year | Pop. | ±% |
|---|---|---|
| 1850 | 231 | — |
| 1860 | 387 | +67.5% |
| 1870 | 626 | +61.8% |
| 1880 | 515 | −17.7% |
| 1890 | 545 | +5.8% |
| 1900 | 622 | +14.1% |
| 1910 | 572 | −8.0% |
| 1920 | 539 | −5.8% |
| 1930 | 507 | −5.9% |
| 1940 | 498 | −1.8% |
| 1950 | 643 | +29.1% |
| 1960 | 441 | −31.4% |
| 1970 | 452 | +2.5% |
| 1980 | 410 | −9.3% |
| 1990 | 386 | −5.9% |
| 2000 | 423 | +9.6% |
| 2010 | 448 | +5.9% |
| 2020 | 367 | −18.1% |
Source:"U.S. Census website". United States Census Bureau. and Iowa Data Center; Source: U.S. Decennial Census

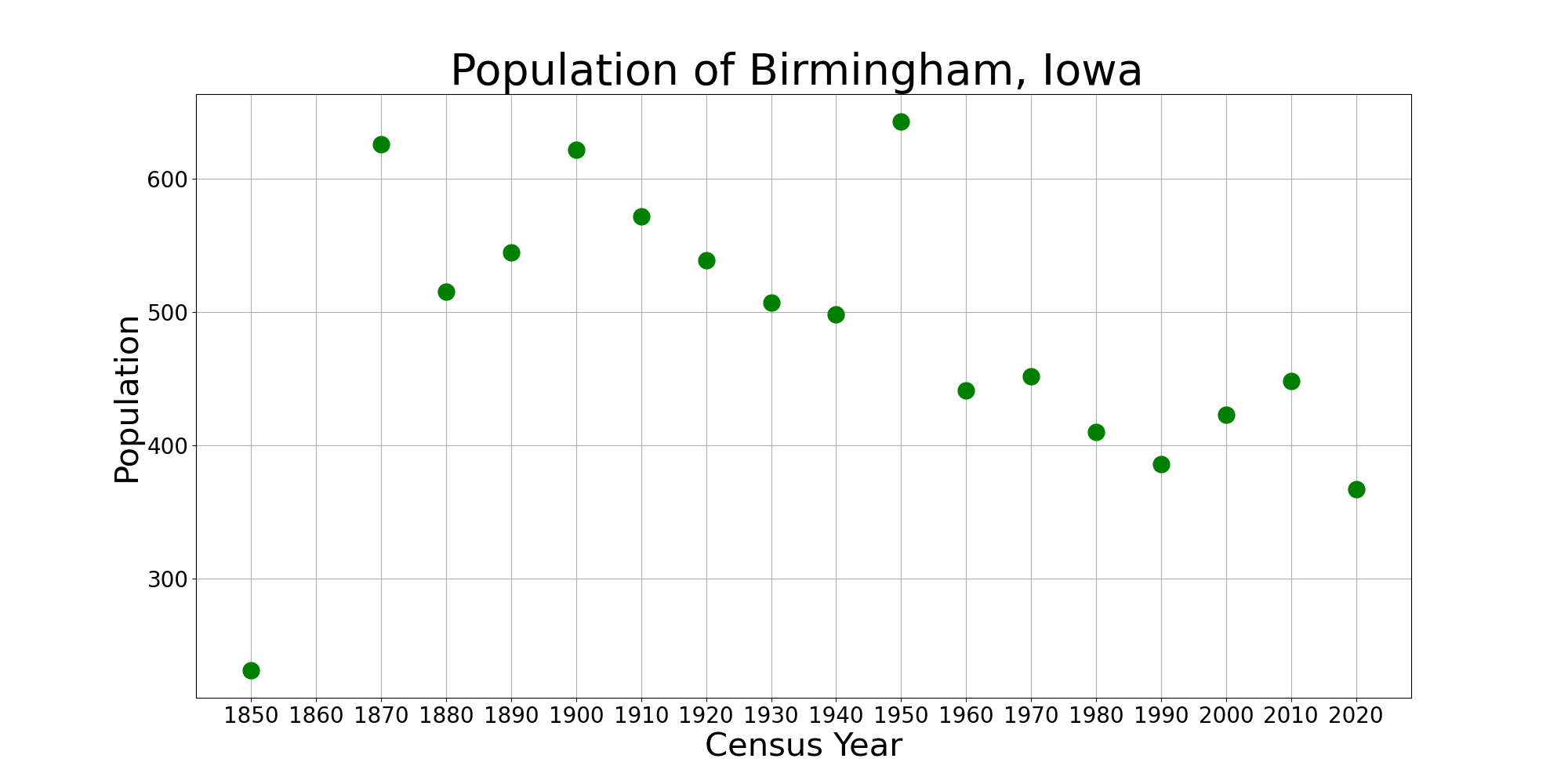
The population of Birmingham, Iowa from US census data

=== 2020 census ===
As of the census of 2020, there were 367 people, 177 households, and 105 families residing in the city. The population density was 362.0 inhabitants per square mile (139.8/km^{2}). There were 193 housing units at an average density of 190.3 per square mile (73.5/km^{2}). The racial makeup of the city was 95.6% White, 0.5% Black or African American, 0.0% Native American, 0.0% Asian, 0.0% Pacific Islander, 0.5% from other races and 3.3% from two or more races. Hispanic or Latino persons of any race comprised 2.2% of the population.

Of the 177 households, 25.4% of which had children under the age of 18 living with them, 42.9% were married couples living together, 7.3% were cohabitating couples, 28.8% had a female householder with no spouse or partner present and 20.9% had a male householder with no spouse or partner present. 40.7% of all households were non-families. 34.5% of all households were made up of individuals, 19.2% had someone living alone who was 65 years old or older.

The median age in the city was 44.8 years. 24.8% of the residents were under the age of 20; 4.4% were between the ages of 20 and 24; 21.3% were from 25 and 44; 29.2% were from 45 and 64; and 20.4% were 65 years of age or older. The gender makeup of the city was 49.9% male and 50.1% female.

=== 2010 census ===
At the 2010 census there were 448 people, 191 households, and 120 families living in the city. The population density was 422.6 inhabitants per square mile (163.2/km^{2}). There were 213 housing units at an average density of 200.9 per square mile (77.6/km^{2}). The racial makup of the city was 97.8% White, 0.7% African American, 0.2% from other races, and 1.3% from two or more races. Hispanic or Latino of any race were 2.0%.

Of the 191 households 30.9% had children under the age of 18 living with them, 48.2% were married couples living together, 7.9% had a female householder with no husband present, 6.8% had a male householder with no wife present, and 37.2% were non-families. 29.8% of households were one person and 10.5% were one person aged 65 or older. The average household size was 2.35 and the average family size was 2.86.

The median age was 41 years. 23% of residents were under the age of 18; 7% were between the ages of 18 and 24; 24.3% were from 25 to 44; 27.4% were from 45 to 64; and 18.3% were 65 or older. The gender makeup of the city was 51.6% male and 48.4% female.

=== 2000 census ===
At the 2000 census there were 423 people, 185 households, and 120 families living in the city. The population density was 402.5 inhabitants per square mile (155.4/km^{2}). There were 204 housing units at an average density of 194.1 per square mile (74.9/km^{2}). The racial makup of the city was 99.53% White, 0.00% African American, 0.00% Native American, 0.00% Asian, 0.24% Pacific Islander, 0.00% from other races, and 0.24% from two or more races. 0.95%. were Hispanic or Latino of any race.

Of the 185 households 29.2% had children under the age of 18 living with them, 54.6% were married couples living together, 8.1% had a female householder with no husband present, and 35.1% were non-families. 29.7% of households were one person and 17.3% were one person aged 65 or older. The average household size was 2.29 and the average family size was 2.86.

The age distribution was 22.7% under the age of 18, 7.3% from 18 to 24, 29.3% from 25 to 44, 20.3% from 45 to 64, and 20.3% 65 or older. The median age was 40 years. For every 100 females, there were 109.4 males. For every 100 females age 18 and over, there were 103.1 males.

The median household income was $31,406 and the median family income was $40,250. Males had a median income of $27,614 versus $20,536 for females. The per capita income for the city was $15,554. 8.8% of the population and 3.5% of families were below the poverty line. Out of the total population, 10.1% of those under the age of 18 and 11.0% of those 65 and older were living below the poverty line.

== Education ==
The community is served by the Van Buren County Community School District. It was previously in the Van Buren Community School District, until it merged into Van Buren County CSD on July 1, 2019.

== Notable people ==
- Rose Talbot Bullard (1864–1915), doctor and medical professor
- William S. Ervin (1886–1951), attorney general of Minnesota
- Clifford R. Hope (1893–1970), U.S. representative from Kansas
