= Eddyville, Iowa =

- City
- Location of Eddyville, Iowa
- Coordinates: 41°09′34″N 92°37′49″W
- Country: US
- State: Iowa
- Counties: Wapello, Mahaska, Monroe

Area
  - Total: 1.16 sq mi (3.00 km^{2})
  - Land: 1.16 sq mi (3.00 km^{2})
  - Water: 0 sq mi (0.00 km^{2})
- Elevation: 676 ft (206 m)

Population (2020)
  - Total: 970
  - Density: 838.4/sq mi (323.71/km^{2})
- Time zone: UTC-6 (Central (CST))
  - Summer (DST): UTC-5 (CDT)
- ZIP code: 52553
- Area code: 641
- FIPS code: 19-23970
- GNIS feature ID: 2394613

Eddyville is a city in Mahaska, Monroe, and Wapello counties in the U.S. state of Iowa. The population was 970 at the time of the 2020 census.

== History ==
Circa 1839, a Sauk village was established on this site following the end of the Black Hawk War. The village was referred to by the name of its chief, Chief Hard Fish, or Wish-e-co-ma-que. In 1840 or 1841, before Iowa became a state, Jabish P. Eddy was permitted to open a trading post in Hard Fish's village. It was a place for trade with the Indians and for pioneers to provision and ford the Des Moines River. In 1842, the area was obtained as part of the New Purchase and the Sauk moved up river. J.P. Eddy became the Indian agent for the area and set aside some of his land for the eponymously named town. In 1843, the area was opened for white settlement. The town was formally incorporated in 1857.

The first commercial coal mines in Wapello County were opened near Eddyville. Local oral history has it that a two-story house that once stood at the northwest corner of Seventh and Vance Streets served as a stop on the Underground Railroad until the Civil War made that unnecessary. Several 'coal banks' were in operation in 1857, including the Roberts Mine, directly across the Des Moines River from town. These mines worked coal seams exposed on the hillsides of the river valley.

Eddyville was served by the Keokuk and Des Moines Railroad, which later became part of the Rock Island Railroad between Ottumwa and Oskaloosa generally on what is known as Sixth Street, and by a spur of the Milwaukee Railroad from Albia, with a trestle bridge across the river to connect to the Rock Island on the north side of Eddyville. The Rock Island depot with a warehouse was between Walnut and Mill Streets, on the west side of the line. The line was closed and abandoned in the 1970s, but the old Milwaukee line has been rebuilt and expanded to serve Cargill and related operations from Albia where it joins the Burlington Northern Santa Fe.

A three-story brick school with a bell tower was located for many years on the block bounded by Seventh and Eighth Streets and Vance and Berdan Streets. This building housed all education for the community, through 12th grade. The property was enlarged with a ball field on the south across Berdan, and a playground on the west. The third story and bell tower were removed early in the twentieth century and the materials used to build a companion high school building, with the remaining portion of the original building used as an elementary school, including the heating plant. An auditorium and gymnasium with a stage was built about the time of World War II. In the late 1950s, the state encouraged school consolidation of the one-room schools in the surrounding countryside, including Chillicothe and Kirkville, and the school district borrowed to build a new junior-senior high school building approximately one mile east, on the south side of the county line road, which opened for classes in the late summer of 1961; the old buildings were then devoted to elementary classes.

Subsequently, Eddyville merged with the Hedrick and Fremont schools and, most recently, Blakesburg.

There was a city-owned electric system with a generator next to the railroad on Sixth Street at Mill Street. Some time around World War I, the city sold the system to a private company.

Following World War II, the city built a public water system with a well on the south side of town and stand pipe water tower on Cemetery Hill. The system produced water pressure of 85-90 pounds per square inch in most of the community.

The volunteer fire department for much of the early and mid-20th century used a truck with three tanks and a front-mounted pump (sometimes called the chemical truck), and a General-St. Louis truck that was acquired from Mason City. Both had open cockpits and could be hand cranked to start the engine. In the late 1950s, the school bus barn burned and the department saved two International Metro buses. Some of the fire department members restored one Metro for the District and the District gave the other one to the department, which used it for rescue for many years thereafter.

About that time, L.W. Klein, owner of the furniture store and funeral home, decided to stop running ambulance calls and donated some of his equipment to the fire department for the rescue truck. The department worked hard with training, fund raising and obtaining equipment, such that when the state became interested in improving ambulance services, they looked at Eddyville's well-developed program as a model.

Iowa law allowed townships to levy a tax for fire protection, and Columbia and East Des Moines Townships contracted with the city to provide this service. Individual property owners from other townships could contract for fire protection. Circa 1960, the townships bought a fire truck on an International chassis with a front mount pump, and the chemical tank truck was retired but the pump was salvaged. In the early 1970s the two townships purchased a truck, had a tank built and a pump (from the old chemical truck) installed for use as a tanker truck and the city and the townships built a building to house the tanker as well as certain city operations and equipment. Circa 1974, the City purchased a new fire truck on a Ford chassis. A new fire station has since been built on Walnut Street at 6th Street, and there is more room for newer equipment.

For many years, the library, jail and upstairs meeting room and city hall, with adjacent fire station, were located at the corner of Walnut and First (or Front) Streets. In the early 1960s, with funding from an inheritance, this was extensively remodeled and modernized.

In the mid-1960s, the city, with a grant and a low-interest loan from the Farmers Home Administration, constructed a sanitary sewer system, with lagoon treatment. The monthly fee was $4.60 for residences and $5.00 for businesses.

The Des Moines River has been a fact of life for the community throughout its history, with major flooding in 1947, 1965 and more recently. The Army Corps of Engineers built a series of levees after the floods of 1947, and has raised them since.

The road to Albia originally crossed the river on a one-lane steel superstructure bridge from the west end of Walnut Street. After World War II, demand for electricity increased, and construction of an electric generating plant by Iowa Southern Utilities was begun across the river and south, known as Bridgeport Station. About the same time, a new concrete bridge was built and the old steel bridge removed, leaving a small park area across from city hall. The Eddyville side of the approach to the new bridge was built on extensive fill which also served as part of the levee system that had been built by the Corps of Engineers.

Demand for electricity continued to grow, Iowa Southern had built bigger, newer plants at Chillicothe and Burlington, and the Bridgeport station was obsolete. Cargill had a new process that worked in the laboratory, but they needed a cheap source of large amounts of steam to see if it worked in practice, so they purchased the Bridgeport Station for this purpose, and the Cargill plant was constructed, and continues to grow.

Telephone service was provided from an office on the second floor of a building on the south side of Walnut Street at the alley between Second and Third Streets, with a switchboard and cranked phones, most of which were on party lines. In the early 1960s, United Telephone modernized this with a new dial system. As a result of a petition drive, citizens agreed to pay 25 cents a month extra to call Ottumwa, Oskaloosa and Albia without long-distance tolls.

== Geography ==
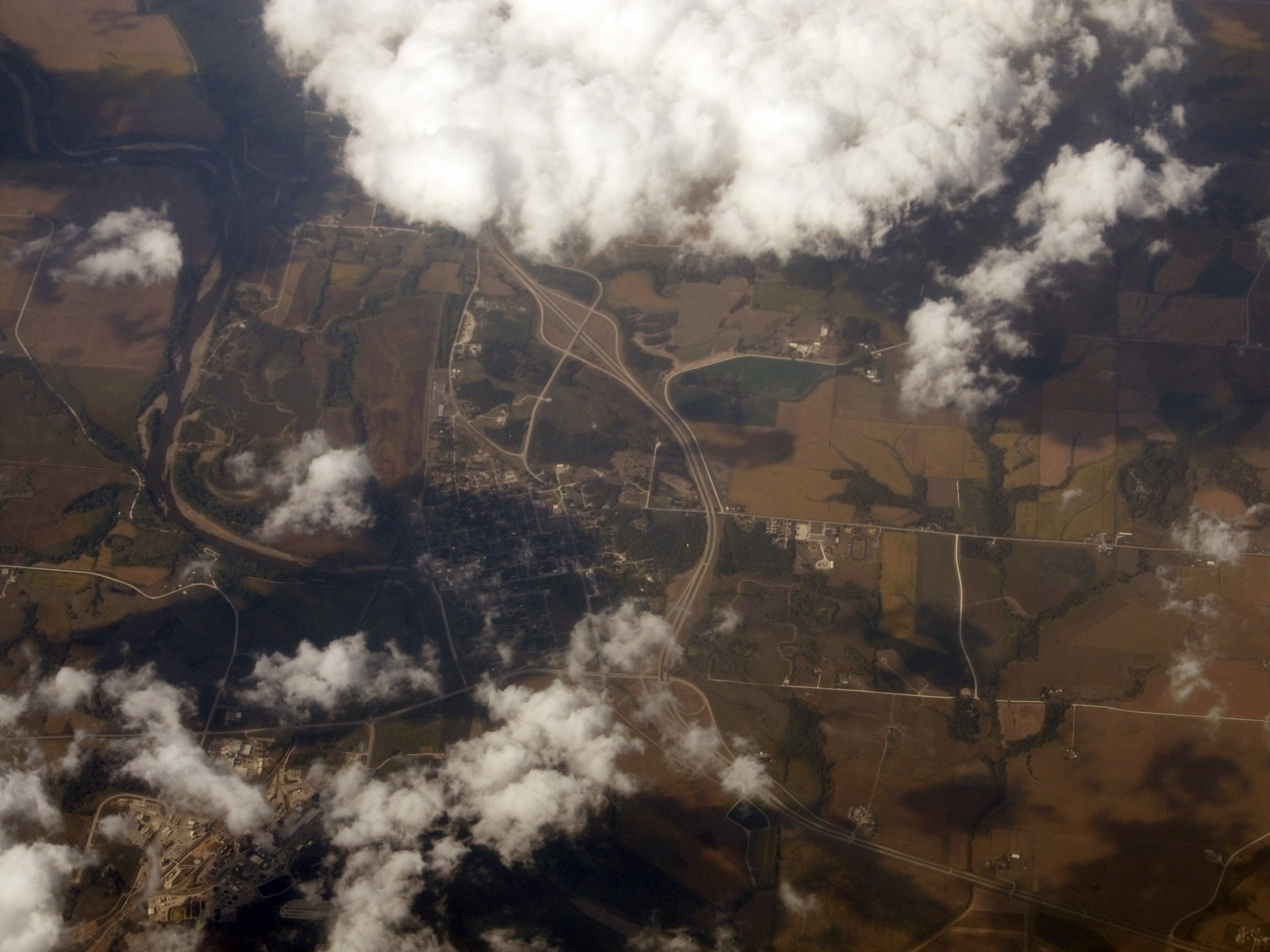
2012 aerial photo of Eddyville

Eddyville is located on the east bank of a bend in the Des Moines River, approximately 70 miles south-southeast of Des Moines and 15 miles north-northwest of Ottumwa.

Eddyville has three counties that all meet within the city limits. The community straddles Wapello, Mahaska and Monroe counties.

According to the United States Census Bureau, the city has a total area of 1.18 square miles (3.06 km^{2}), all land.

== Demographics ==
Historical populations
Year	Pop.	±%
1860	912	—
1870	1,212	+32.9%
1880	909	−25.0%
1890	815	−10.3%
1900	1,230	+50.9%
1910	1,085	−11.8%
1920	961	−11.4%
1930	888	−7.6%
1940	984	+10.8%
1950	941	−4.4%
1960	1,014	+7.8%
1970	945	−6.8%
1980	1,116	+18.1%
1990	1,036	−7.2%
2000	1,064	+2.7%
2010	1,024	−3.8%
2020	970	−5.3%
Source:"U.S. Census website". United States Census Bureau. and Iowa Data Center; Source: U.S. Decennial Census

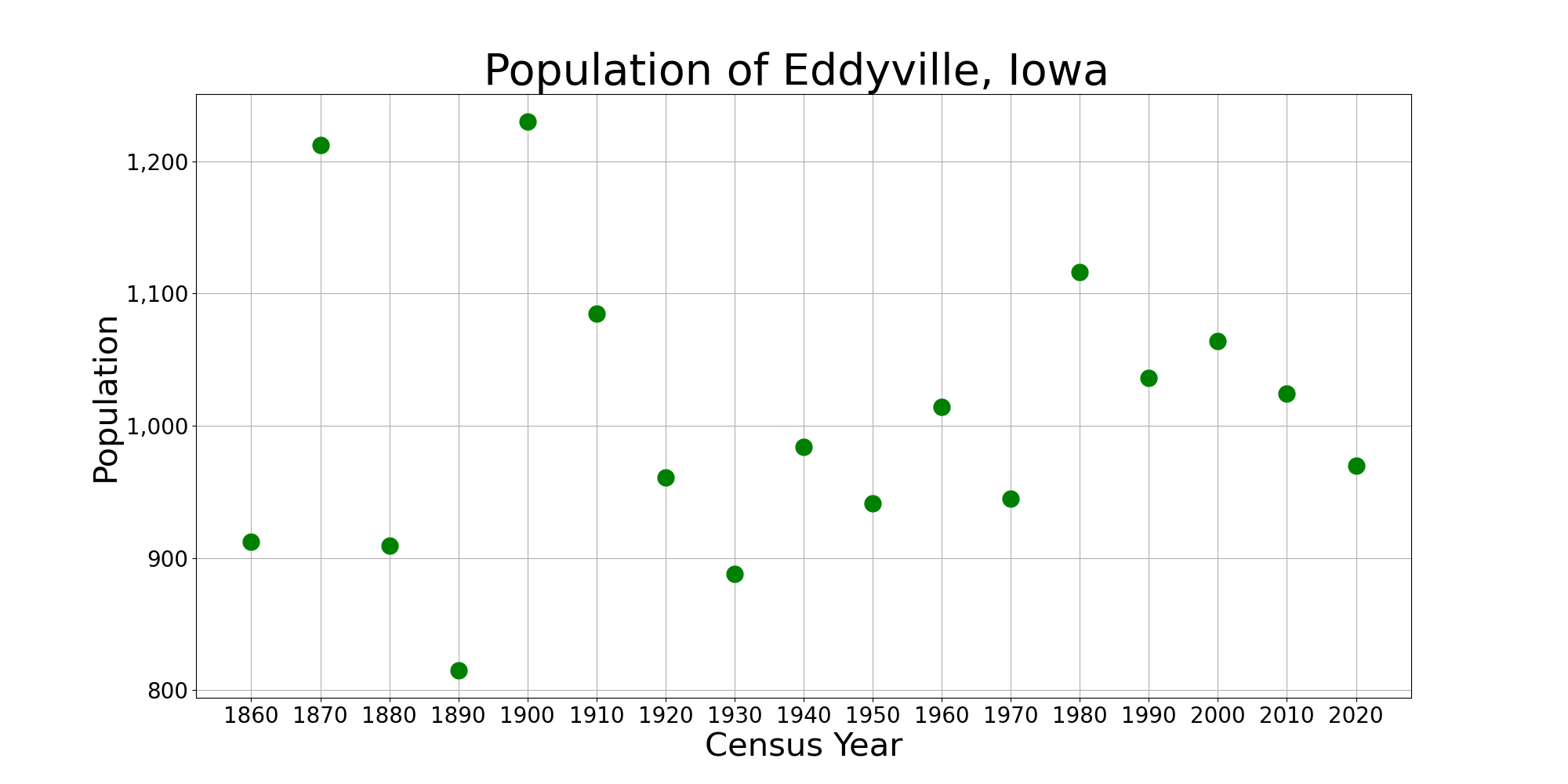
The population of Eddyville, Iowa from US census data

=== 2020 census ===
As of the census of 2020, there were 970 people, 398 households, and 261 families residing in the city. The population density was 838.4 inhabitants per square mile (323.7/km^{2}). There were 436 housing units at an average density of 376.8 per square mile (145.5/km^{2}). The racial makeup of the city was 93.2% White, 0.6% Black or African American, 0.0% Native American, 1.4% Asian, 0.0% Pacific Islander, 1.3% from other races and 3.4% from two or more races. Hispanic or Latino persons of any race comprised 2.8% of the population.

Of the 398 households, 33.7% of which had children under the age of 18 living with them, 47.5% were married couples living together, 8.3% were cohabitating couples, 27.1% had a female householder with no spouse or partner present and 17.1% had a male householder with no spouse or partner present. 34.4% of all households were non-families. 28.1% of all households were made up of individuals, 13.1% had someone living alone who was 65 years old or older.

The median age in the city was 40.4 years. 27.0% of the residents were under the age of 20; 6.6% were between the ages of 20 and 24; 21.2% were from 25 and 44; 26.6% were from 45 and 64; and 18.6% were 65 years of age or older. The gender makeup of the city was 48.2% male and 51.8% female.

=== 2010 census ===
As of the census of 2010, there were 1,024 people, 409 households, and 278 families residing in the city. The population density was 867.8 inhabitants per square mile (335.1/km^{2}). There were 449 housing units at an average density of 380.5 units per square mile (146.9 units/km^{2}). The racial makeup of the city was 96.5% White, 0.1% African American, 0.1% Native American, 0.1% Asian, 1.6% from other races, and 1.7% from two or more races. Hispanic or Latino of any race were 2.4% of the population.

There were 409 households, of which 36.7% had children under the age of 18 living with them, 51.3% were married couples living together, 12.5% had a female householder with no husband present, 4.2% had a male householder with no wife present, and 32.0% were non-families. 27.1% of all households were made up of individuals, and 12.7% had someone living alone who was 65 years of age or older. The average household size was 2.50 and the average family size was 3.04.

The median age in the city was 38.4 years. 27.7% of residents were under the age of 18; 6.2% were between the ages of 18 and 24; 24% were from 25 to 44; 28.5% were from 45 to 64; and 13.6% were 65 years of age or older. The gender makeup of the city was 48.1% male and 51.9% female.

=== 2000 census ===
As of the census of 2000, there were 1,064 people, 424 households, and 278 families residing in the city. The population density was 898.9 inhabitants per square mile (347.1/km^{2}). There were 453 housing units at an average density of 382.7 units per square mile (147.8 units/km^{2}). The racial makeup of the city was 98.68% White, 0.09% African American, 0.38% Asian, 0.38% from other races, and 0.47% from two or more races. Hispanic or Latino of any race were 0.94% of the population.

There were 424 households, out of which 32.8% had children under the age of 18 living with them, 50.0% were married couples living together, 11.1% had a female householder with no husband present, and 34.2% were non-families. 27.8% of all households were made up of individuals, and 13.2% had someone living alone who was 65 years of age or older. The average household size was 2.51 and the average family size was 3.07.

In the city, the population was spread out, with 27.7% under the age of 18, 10.9% from 18 to 24, 27.9% from 25 to 44, 19.8% from 45 to 64, and 13.6% who were 65 years of age or older. The median age was 34 years. For every 100 females, there were 93.5 males. For every 100 females age 18 and over, there were 88.0 males.

The median income for a household in the city was $32,446, and the median income for a family was $40,875. Males had a median income of $31,250 versus $21,304 for females. The per capita income for the city was $16,354. About 7.2% of families and 12.0% of the population were below the poverty line, including 11.9% of those under age 18 and 12.9% of those age 65 or over.

== Economy ==
Cargill has a large corn processing plant here, which dominates the town's skyline. Ethanol, high fructose corn syrup, and gluten are among its products. Across the street, Ajinomoto North America, inc. has a plant that turns the glucose into mono-sodium glutamate. Wacker Chemie also runs a plant across the fence of Cargill. Chamness Technology operates a composting facility outside of town that recycles various organic wastes into compost.

== Parks and recreation ==
A tiny park at the foot of Walnut Street has a bench that looks out on the Des Moines River. The main park is bounded by Third and Fourth Streets, and Main and Market Streets. It includes a covered band stand, a statue of a Union soldier, and a log cabin.

== Education ==
The Eddyville–Blakesburg–Fremont Community School District has two school buildings here: Eddyville–Blakesburg–Fremont High School, and Eddyville Elementary Attendance Center. The district also has a daycare center integrated with the elementary building.

The district was formed by the 2012 merger of the Eddyville–Blakesburg Community School District and the Fremont Community School District. The former was formed in 1994 by the merger of the Eddyville Community School District and the Blakesburg Community School District.

== Notable people ==
- Leroy Lamis, sculptor and digital artist
- Amos Milton Musser, Mormon pioneer
- Sandy Sandberg, American football player
- Mary Louise Smith, women's rights activist and Chairwoman of the Republican National Committee
