= Lick Creek Township, Davis County, Iowa =

Lick Creek Township
- Township
- Location in Davis County
- Coordinates: 40°51′52″N 92°21′09″W
- Country: United States
- State: Iowa
- County: Davis

Area
  - Total: 35.58 sq mi (92.14 km^{2})
  - Land: 35.54 sq mi (92.06 km^{2})
  - Water: 0.031 sq mi (0.08 km^{2}) 0.09%
- Elevation: 659 ft (201 m)

Population (2000)
  - Total: 847
  - Density: 24/sq mi (9.2/km^{2})
- GNIS feature ID: 0468233

Lick Creek Township is a township in Davis County, Iowa, United States. As of the 2000 census, its population was 847. This number continues to drop, with the 2023 census having the population at 714.

== History ==
Lick Creek Township was organized in 1846. It took its name from Lick Creek.

== Geography ==
Lick Creek Township covers an area of 35.58 square miles (92.14 square kilometers); of this, 0.03 square miles (0.08 square kilometers) or 0.09 percent is water. The streams of Lick Creek, Little Soap Creek, Morgan Branch and North Chequest Creek run through this township.

=== Cities and towns ===
- Floris

=== Unincorporated towns ===
- Dunnville
- Pleasant View

(This list is based on USGS data and may include former settlements.)

=== Adjacent townships ===
- Keokuk Township, Wapello County (north)
- Washington Township, Wapello County (northeast)
- Salt Creek Township (east)
- Union Township (southeast)
- Perry Township (south)
- Cleveland Township (southwest)
- Soap Creek Township (west)
- Green Township, Wapello County (northwest)

=== Cemeteries ===
The township contains nine cemeteries: Dunnville, Fiedler, Jay, McCormick, Odd Fellows, Parrott, Spence, Swinney and Wilson.

=== Major highways ===
- U.S. Route 63
