= Dahlonega, Iowa =

- Unincorporated community
- Location within Iowa
- Coordinates: 41°03′31″N 92°22′12″W
- Country: United States
- State: Iowa
- County: Wapello
- Elevation: 827 ft (252 m)
- Time zone: UTC-6 (Central (CST))
  - Summer (DST): UTC-5 (CDT)
- Area code: 641
- GNIS feature ID: 455767

Dahlonega is an unincorporated community in Wapello County, Iowa, United States.

== Geography ==
Dahlonega lies northeast of Ottumwa, near the junction of U.S. Route 63 and County Highway H-25.

== History ==
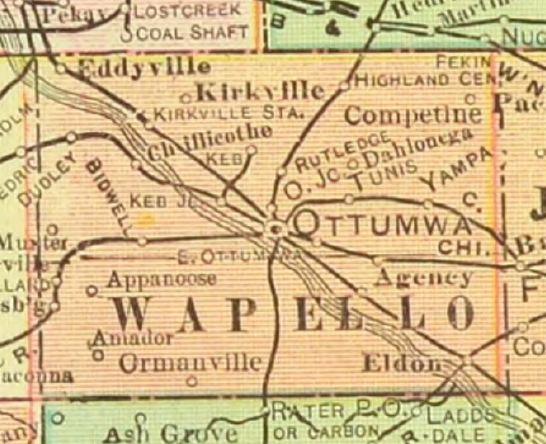
Dahlonega in Wapello County, Iowa, in 1902

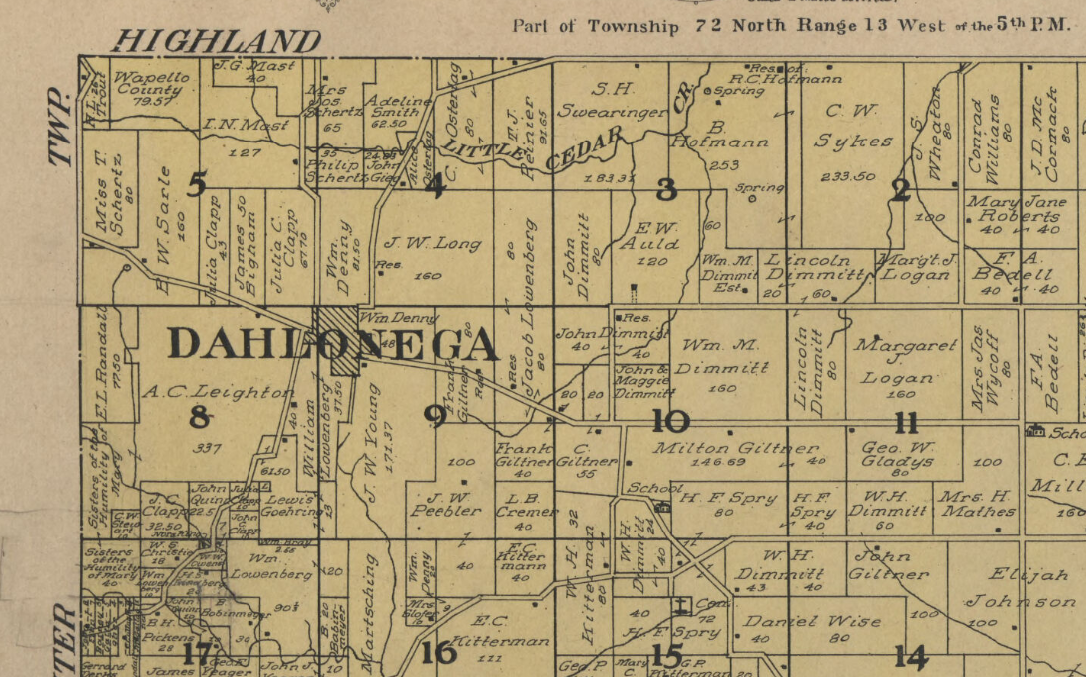
Dahlonega, Iowa, in Dahlonega Township

Dahlonega was founded in Dahlonega Township. The site was originally named Shellbark because several homes were made of shellbark hickory wood, but was changed to Dahlonega, a Native American word meaning "gold" or "yellow".

The community is located in sections 8 and 9 of Dahlonega Township.

The post office at Dahlonega operated from 1844 to 1907. A number of schools operated in the area. Dahlonega School No. 1 educated students from 1921 to 1959, and is now listed on the National Register of Historic Places.

Dahlonega's bid to become the county seat of Wapello County was defeated by one vote in 1843.

In 1850, Dahlonega had three stores, a tavern, a blacksmith shop, a church, a school, and a sawmill. A town hall, a pottery, and two meat-packing houses followed in 1856. In 1875, Dahlonega was the site of "one Methodist Episcopal Church, two stores, and one or two shops"; at that time, the population was estimated to be 200.

Dahlonega's population was estimated at 300 in 1887, and was 292 in 1902. However, by 1917, the population had dropped to 131. The population was 475 in 1940.

== See also ==
- Yampa, Iowa
