= Salt Creek Township, Davis County, Iowa =

Salt Creek Township
- Township
- Location in Davis County
- Coordinates: 40°51′56″N 92°13′56″W
- Country: United States
- State: Iowa
- County: Davis

Area
  - Total: 35.90 sq mi (92.98 km^{2})
  - Land: 35.60 sq mi (92.21 km^{2})
  - Water: 0.29 sq mi (0.76 km^{2}) 0.82%
- Elevation: 751 ft (229 m)

Population (2000)
  - Total: 294
  - Density: 8.3/sq mi (3.2/km^{2})
- GNIS feature ID: 0468658

Salt Creek Township is a township in Davis County, Iowa, United States. As of the 2000 census, its population was 294.

== History ==
Salt Creek Township was organized in 1846. It took its name from Salt Creek.

== Geography ==
Salt Creek Township covers an area of 35.9 square miles (92.98 square kilometers); of this, 0.29 square miles (0.76 square kilometers) or 0.82 percent is water. The stream of Salt Creek runs through this township.

=== Unincorporated towns ===
- Chequest
- White Elm

(This list is based on USGS data and may include former settlements.)

=== Adjacent townships ===
- Washington Township, Wapello County (north)
- Des Moines Township, Jefferson County (northeast)
- Village Township, Van Buren County (east)
- Chequest Township, Van Buren County (southeast)
- Union Township (south)
- Perry Township (southwest)
- Lick Creek Township (west)
- Keokuk Township, Wapello County (northwest)

=== Cemeteries ===
The township contains ten cemeteries: Anderson, Bethlehem, Glasgow, Heidlebaugh, Hem, Jackson, Litgner, Mount Gilead, Pagett and Pierce.
