= Cardinal Community School District =

Public school district in Eldon, Iowa, United States

Coordinates: 40.960918°N 92.238019°W

Location
- Eldon, Iowa Wapello, Davis, Jefferson and Van Buren counties United States
- Coordinates: 40.960918, -92.238019

District information
- Type: Local school district
- Grades: K-12
- Established: 1960; 65 years ago
- Superintendent: James Craig
- Schools: 3
- Budget: $14,203,000 (2020-21)
- NCES District ID: 1906240

Students and staff
- Students: 1107 (2023-24)
- Teachers: 79.23 FTE
- Staff: 96.17 FTE
- Student–teacher ratio: 13.97
- Athletic conference: South Central Conference (Iowa)
- District mascot: Comets
- Colors: Red and White

Other information
- Website: www.cardinalcomet.com

The Cardinal Community School District is a rural public school district headquartered in Eldon, Iowa. It spans areas in Wapello, Davis, Jefferson and Van Buren counties. It serves the cities of Eldon, Agency, and Batavia, the unincorporated communities of Selma and Bladensburg, as well as the surrounding rural areas.

The district was formed in 1960 as a consolidation of schools in Eldon, Agency, Batavia, and Selma.

Joel Pedersen served as superintendent from 2010-2023. He was named Iowa Superintendent of the Year by the School Administrators of Iowa in 2020.

Former elementary principal Heather Buckley was named Iowa Elementary Principal of the Year in 2022.

== Schools ==
The district operates three schools, all in Eldon:

- Cardinal Elementary School
- Cardinal Junior High School
- Cardinal High School

=== Cardinal High School ===
==== Athletics ====
The Comets compete in the South Central Conference in the following sports:

- Baseball
- Basketball
- Cross Country
- Football
- Softball
  - 2-time Class 1A State Champions (2003, 2004)
- Track and Field
- Volleyball
- Wrestling

== See also ==
- List of school districts in Iowa
- List of high schools in Iowa
