= Lynching of Garrett Thompson =

1866 lynching in Iowa, United States

- Date: June 1866
- Location: Monroe County, Iowa United States
- Participants: Residents of Monroe County, Iowa
- Deaths: 1

In the early hours of June 1866, an alleged notorious horse thief named Garrett Thompson was taken from the Monroe County jail and lynched. Thompson was accused of horse stealing and other crimes including house burning and murder.

== Background ==
Lynchings are a form of extrajudicial killings, not protected or sanctioned by law. They were often considered fair rulings towards individuals who were accused of crimes such as murder, rape, and other sexual assault. Lynchings were conducted across the United States, with the practice becoming more popular following the Civil War.

== Lynching ==
On June 13, 1866, a man named James McFadden had a span of horses stolen. On the night of June 16, another man with the last name of Woodruff was robbed of $90. A series of other robberies were conducted throughout the rest of the week. Suspicion began to lie on Thompson following his absence during the robberies and returning with a new wagon. Once the Vigilance Committee had sufficient evidence, Thompson was taken into custody, along with several of his accomplices.

Thompson's arrest attracted a large crowd. He was placed in the front room of the prison by the sheriff. While a man named Colonel Anderson cross questioned him. As commotion began to grow inside the prison the sheriff placed Thompson further back into the prison. This attempt was soon overtaken with the mob getting ahold of Thompson and started out of town with him.

The mob set up a tent about six miles southeast of Albia in the woods. Messages were sent in every direction to summon the populace, and the other prisoners were also brought out to the grounds. By noon of that day approximately 500 spectators had assembled at the location. A court was improvised under an elm tree. A chairman was appointed along with a jury of twelve men enrolled to try the prisoners. The jury was then called along with witnesses and brought Thompson forward. After investigation he was charged with horse stealing and other outrages. The foreman then announced the verdict: hanging.

Upon learning his fate, Thompson believed he was being intimidated by the crowd as a means to get a confession out of him. To his surprise the verdict was final and following the prayer by Scott. The fellow prisoners were brought out front row to witness the hanging of their associate. The wagon was then pushed thus hanging Thompson. The prisoners were then taken back, and the crowd soon dispersed.

== Reaction and aftermath ==
Following the hanging of Thompson, his wife and son along with a few citizens assisted the pair in placing his body in a wagon to bring his body back towards Eddyville. The wife vowing vengeance on the citizens as she left with her husband's body. The remainder of the allies of Garrett Thompson, who were also imprisoned, ultimately were released. Except Tom Smith, whose neck was spared due to him previously being a Monroe County soldier thus his connections ultimately spared his life. Thus, with the death of Garrett Thompson ended the reign of terror for many citizens in the states of Iowa, Missouri, and Illinois. For a span of 3–4 years Thompson along with several others were a part of a horse thief operation. It was alleged that Thompson used nitric acid on the foreheads of the horses stolen to conceal the identity of the horses and avoid recognition from their previous owners.

== See also ==
- Lynching in the United States
- Lynching of Samuel J. Bush

== Citations ==
1. Hickenlooper, Frank. An Illustrated History of Monroe County, Iowa: A Complete Civil, Political, and Military History of the County, From Its Earliest Period of Organization Down to 1896. Chapt. 11. p. 171-182. Albia, Iowa. 1896.
2. Grahame, O. F., (1925) "The Vigilance Committees", The Palimpsest 6(10), 359-370
