= Bladensburg =

Bladensburg can mean:

== Australia ==
- Bladensburg National Park, a former pastoral station and homestead in Queensland

== United States ==
- Bladensburg, Maryland, a town in Prince George's County
- Bladensburg, Iowa, an unincorporated community in Wapello County
- Bladensburg, Ohio, an unincorporated community in Knox County
