= Yampa, Iowa =

- Unincorporated community
- Location within Iowa
- Coordinates: 41°00′36″N 92°13′32″W
- Country: United States
- State: Iowa
- County: Wapello
- Elevation: 755 ft (230 m)
- Time zone: UTC-6 (Central (CST))
  - Summer (DST): UTC-5 (CDT)
- Area code: 641
- GNIS feature ID: 464301

Yampa is a small unincorporated community in Wapello County, Iowa, United States.

Yampa was the site of a school, rail station, general store, cemetery, and short-lived post office.

== Geography ==
Yampa lies west of Batavia, near the junction of U.S. Route 34 and County Highway V-43, south of Bladensburg.

== History ==
=== Early years ===
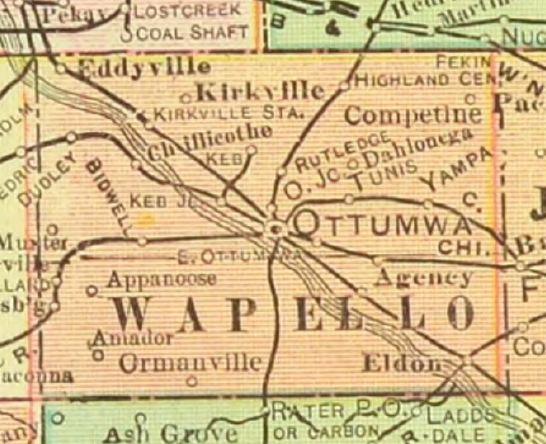
Yampa in Wapello County, Iowa, 1902

Yampa was founded in Pleasant Township. The village of Yampa briefly had a post office from 1899 to 1900. Charles E. Walker was the postmaster. The site was established on the Chicago, Fort Madison and Des Moines Railway. At this time, Yampa was considered a community.

Yampa had a school in this era. In addition to the school and post office, Yampa had a general store and was considered a "thriving little town". The Yampa school was also used as a church.

A literary society was formed in Yampa in November 1899. The literary society held events in Yampa and co-sponsored events with the Pleasant Grove literary society. In 1900, due to the railroad line in Yampa being "torn up" due to construction, Yampa's mail service was disrupted, with it being reported that mail was arriving late or not at all.

Yampa's population was 12 in 1902. The Yampa School District was still operational in 1916.

=== Later years ===
In 1936, Yampa celebrated its Independence Day with races, athletic contests, music, and dances at the Ennis (Yampa) Sterner grove. Speeches were made by Iowa Attorney General candidate Robert Shaw and secretary of the National Farmers Union Edward E. Kennedy.

In 1939, the rail line between Ft. Madison and Ottumwa, called the 'Pea Vine', was discontinued, with the railroad being torn out. Yampa had been the first stop on the railroad; by this date, the Ottumwa Courier noted, the town of Yampa was mostly found on older maps. In 1962, it was recalled that the Yampa school, along with other area schools, had been painted white.

In 1991, the Ottumwa Public Library announced a pictorial history project of historic towns in Wapello County, including Yampa, Ormanville, and Competine.

The Yampa-Sterner cemetery is maintained by Pleasant Township.

== See also ==
- Dahlonega, Iowa
