= South Central Conference (Iowa) =

Iowa High School athletic conference

- Conference: IHSAA / IGHSAU
- Founded: 1930
- Sports fielded: 18
- No. of teams: 8
- Region: Southern Iowa
- Official website: https://www.southcentralconf.org/

The South Central Conference is a high school athletic conference in Iowa. Made up of mid-sized 2A and 3A schools, the conference currently has eight members, five of which are based in their respective county seats. Because of the lack of student population in southern Iowa, most of the schools are the lone district in their county, or are flanked only by very small schools. The conference was formed in 1930 by Knoxville, Pella, Indianola High School, West Des Moines Valley, and Winterset.

At the end of the 1995–96 school year, the members were Albia, Centerville, Chariton, Davis County (Bloomfield), Grinnell, Knoxville, Oskaloosa and Pella.

Albia, Centerville, Chariton and Davis County (Bloomfield) reformed the league by adding Eddyville–Blakesburg from the Des Moines River Conference and Clarke (Osceola) from the Little Hawkeye Conference, as Grinnell, Knoxville and Pella left for the Little Hawkeye Conference.

In the 2014 academic school year, Knoxville re-joined from the Little Hawkeye Conference, bringing the total number of teams in the conference to seven.

At the start of the 2022-2023 school year Cardinal (Eldon) joined the conference moving from the Southeast Iowa Superconference.

On March 11, 2026, the Oskaloosa Community School District formally submitted a letter of interest to the South Central Conference seeking potential placement. The school district also submitted a LoI to the Southeast Conference.

== Members ==
Institution	High school location	Mascot	Colors	Affiliation	2026-2027 BEDS
Albia	Albia	Blue Demons/Lady Dees		Public	236
Cardinal	Eldon	Comets		Public	204
Centerville	Centerville	Big Reds		Public	260
Chariton	Chariton	Chargers		Public	264
Clarke	Osceola	Indians		Public	312
Davis County	Bloomfield	Mustangs		Public	251
Eddyville-Blakesburg-Fremont	Eddyville	Rockets		Public	231
Knoxville	Knoxville	Panthers		Public	347

=== Former membership ===
Prairie City Monroe - 1998–2006

== Boys Basketball Conference Champions ==
Year	Team	Overall record	Conference record	Runners up
2019	EBF	16–5	12–0	Knoxville
2018	EBF	20–4	12–0	Knoxville
2017	Knoxville	16–8	12–0	Chariton
2016	Chariton	24–3	12–0	Knoxville
2015	Chariton/Knoxville	17–6/13–9	10–2/10–2	Albia
2014	Chariton	21–4	9–1	Centerville
2013	Centerville	20–3	10–0	Chariton
2012	EBF	15–7	9–1	Centerville
2011	Centerville	17–6	9–1	Davis County
2010	Davis County	19–4	10–2	Albia
2009	Davis County/Albia	16–7/14–9	8–2/8–2	Centerville
2008	Davis County	14–8	9–1	Albia
2007	Clarke	19–3	9–1	Albia/Chariton
2006	Albia	17–7	12–1	PCM, Monroe
2005	Centerville
2004
2003	Centerville
2002	PCM
2001	Centerville/Eddyville-Blakesburg
2000	Eddyville-Blakesburg

== Girls Basketball Conference Champions ==
Year	Team	Overall record	Conference record	Runners up
2019	Knoxville
2018	Knoxville
