= Competine Township, Wapello County, Iowa =

Township in Wapello County, Iowa, U.S.

Coordinates: 41.1192°N 92.2378°W

Competine Township is a township in Wapello County, Iowa, United States.

== History ==
Competine Township was organized in 1844.
