= Agency Township, Wapello County, Iowa =

Township in Wapello County, Iowa, U.S.

Coordinates: 40.9951°N 92.3177°W

Agency Township is a township in Wapello County, Iowa, United States.

== History ==
Agency Township was organized in 1851.
