= Dudley, Iowa =

- Former community
- Location within Iowa Location within the United States
- Coordinates: 41°05′16″N 92°35′31″W
- Country: United States
- State: Iowa
- County: Wapello
- Elevation: 692 ft (211 m)
- Time zone: UTC-6 (Central (CST))
  - Summer (DST): UTC-5 (CDT)
- Area code: 641
- GNIS feature ID: 464522

Dudley is a ghost town in Wapello County, Iowa, United States. Both 1908 and 1920 surveys of northwestern Wapello County show a post office at Dudley.

== History ==
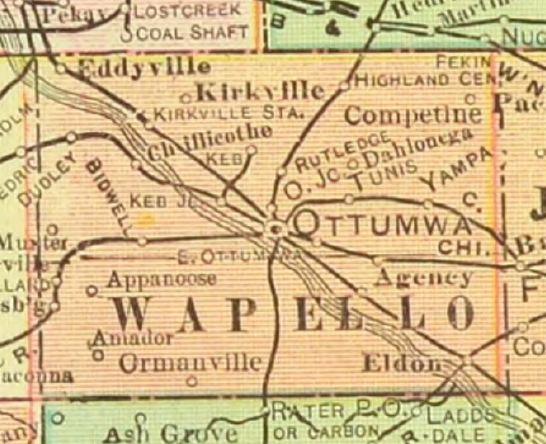
Dudley in Wapello County, Iowa, in 1902

Dudley's population was 55 in 1902, and 64 in 1925.

Dudley's population was 64 in 1940.
