= Chillicothe, Iowa =

- City
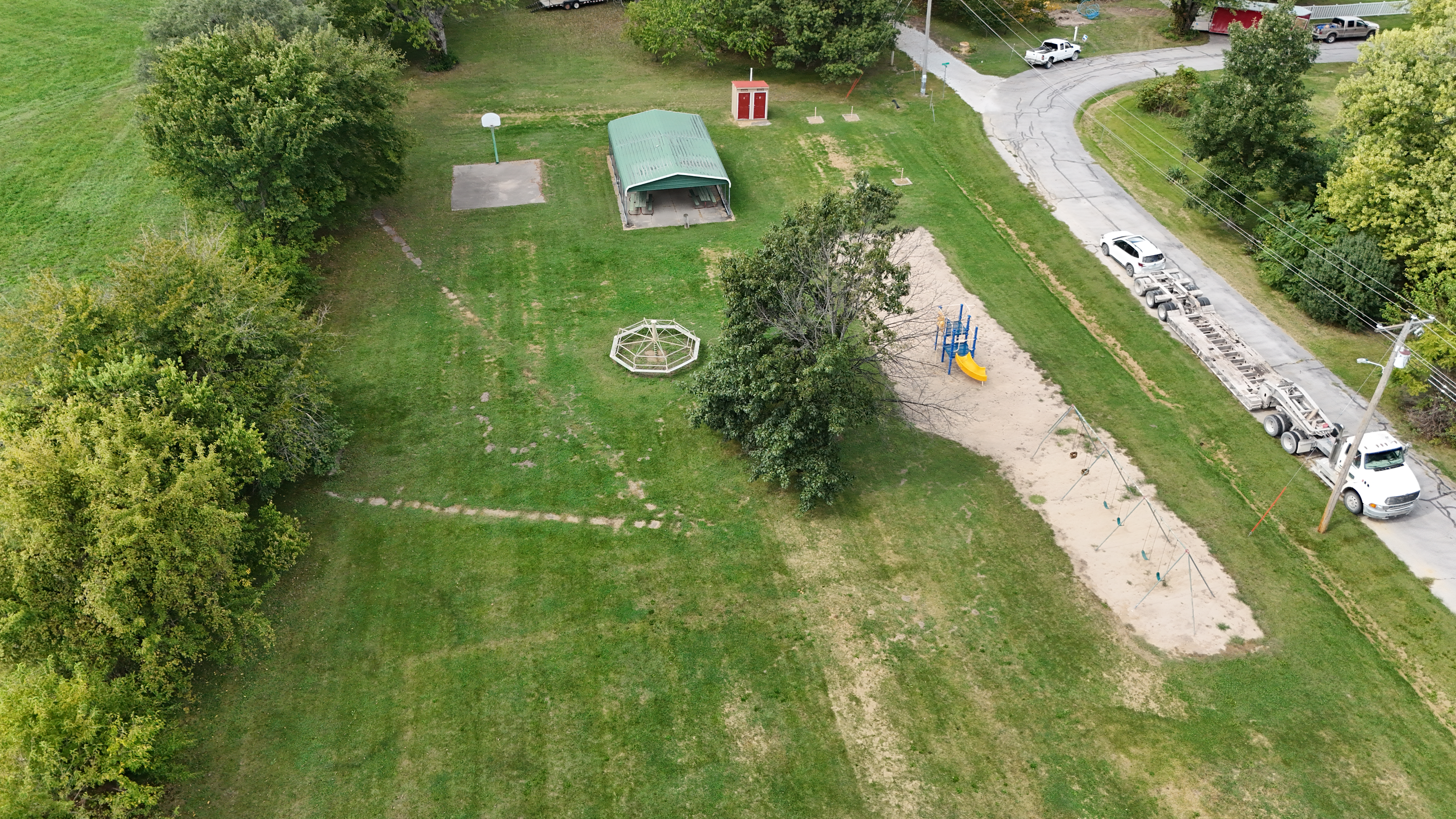
- Chillicothe Park

- Location of Chillicothe, Iowa
- Coordinates: 41°05′10″N 92°31′48″W
- Country: USA
- State: Iowa
- County: Wapello
- Incorporated: December 22, 1881

Area
  - Total: 0.25 sq mi (0.65 km^{2})
  - Land: 0.23 sq mi (0.59 km^{2})
  - Water: 0.023 sq mi (0.06 km^{2})
- Elevation: 686 ft (209 m)

Population (2020)
  - Total: 76
  - Density: 336.2/sq mi (129.79/km^{2})
- Time zone: UTC-6 (Central (CST))
  - Summer (DST): UTC-5 (CDT)
- ZIP code: 52548
- Area code: 641
- FIPS code: 19-13215
- GNIS feature ID: 2393516

Chillicothe (/tʃɪləˈkɒθiː/) is a city in Wapello County, Iowa, United States. The population was 76 at the 2020 census.

== History ==
Chillicothe was laid out in 1849 and was incorporated in 1881.

The word "Chillicothe" is derived from the ancient Shawnee Indian words meaning "Principal Place." It was the name for one of their clans. The main chief of the Shawnee could only come from the Chillicothe clan. When a village was called Chillicothe, it meant that it was home to the principal chief. It was the capital city of the Shawnees until the death of the chief. Then, the capitol would move to the home village of the next main chief. That village would then become Chillicothe.

Chillicothe is the burial place of the oldest man to serve in the Civil War, Curtis King.

== Geography ==
According to the United States Census Bureau, the city has a total area of 0.24 square miles (0.62 km^{2}), of which 0.23 square miles (0.60 km^{2}) is land and 0.01 square miles (0.03 km^{2}) is water.

== Demographics ==
Historical populations
Year	Pop.	±%
1870	211	—
1880	234	+10.9%
1890	214	−8.5%
1900	216	+0.9%
1910	181	−16.2%
1920	146	−19.3%
1930	156	+6.8%
1940	173	+10.9%
1950	196	+13.3%
1960	148	−24.5%
1970	126	−14.9%
1980	131	+4.0%
1990	119	−9.2%
2000	90	−24.4%
2010	97	+7.8%
2020	76	−21.6%
Source:"U.S. Census website". United States Census Bureau. and Iowa Data Center; Source: U.S. Decennial Census

=== 2020 census ===
As of the census of 2020, there were 76 people, 30 households, and 22 families residing in the city. The population density was 336.2 inhabitants per square mile (129.8/km^{2}). There were 34 housing units at an average density of 150.4 per square mile (58.1/km^{2}). The racial makeup of the city was 88.2% White, 0.0% Black or African American, 0.0% Native American, 0.0% Asian, 1.3% Pacific Islander, 5.3% from other races and 5.3% from two or more races. Hispanic or Latino persons of any race comprised 5.3% of the population.

Of the 30 households, 23.3% of which had children under the age of 18 living with them, 60.0% were married couples living together, 13.3% were cohabitating couples, 10.0% had a female householder with no spouse or partner present and 16.7% had a male householder with no spouse or partner present. 26.7% of all households were non-families. 20.0% of all households were made up of individuals, 10.0% had someone living alone who was 65 years old or older.

The median age in the city was 47.5 years. 17.1% of the residents were under the age of 20; 2.6% were between the ages of 20 and 24; 26.3% were from 25 and 44; 36.8% were from 45 and 64; and 17.1% were 65 years of age or older. The gender makeup of the city was 53.9% male and 46.1% female.

=== 2010 census ===
As of the census of 2010, there were 97 people, 35 households, and 21 families residing in the city. The population density was 421.7 inhabitants per square mile (162.8/km^{2}). There were 45 housing units at an average density of 195.7 per square mile (75.6/km^{2}). The racial makeup of the city was 100.0% White. Hispanic or Latino of any race were 1.0% of the population.

There were 35 households, of which 37.1% had children under the age of 18 living with them, 48.6% were married couples living together, 5.7% had a female householder with no husband present, 5.7% had a male householder with no wife present, and 40.0% were non-families. 28.6% of all households were made up of individuals, and 8.6% had someone living alone who was 65 years of age or older. The average household size was 2.77 and the average family size was 3.33.

The median age in the city was 35.5 years. 27.8% of residents were under the age of 18; 12.4% were between the ages of 18 and 24; 22.7% were from 25 to 44; 27.9% were from 45 to 64; and 9.3% were 65 years of age or older. The gender makeup of the city was 48.5% male and 51.5% female.

=== 2000 census ===
As of the census of 2000, there were 90 people, 38 households, and 25 families residing in the city. The population density was 395.7 inhabitants per square mile (152.8/km^{2}). There were 44 housing units at an average density of 193.4 per square mile (74.7/km^{2}). The racial makeup of the city was 97.78% White, 1.11% Asian, and 1.11% from two or more races.

There were 38 households, out of which 28.9% had children under the age of 18 living with them, 50.0% were married couples living together, 7.9% had a female householder with no husband present, and 34.2% were non-families. 28.9% of all households were made up of individuals, and 10.5% had someone living alone who was 65 years of age or older. The average household size was 2.37 and the average family size was 2.96.

Population spread: 27.8% under the age of 18, 5.6% from 18 to 24, 26.7% from 25 to 44, 30.0% from 45 to 64, and 10.0% who were 65 years of age or older. The median age was 41 years. For every 100 females, there were 114.3 males. For every 100 females age 18 and over, there were 109.7 males.

The median income for a household in the city was $30,781, and the median income for a family was $31,750. Males had a median income of $25,417 versus $25,625 for females. The per capita income for the city was $19,075. There were 12.0% of families and 13.8% of the population living below the poverty line, including 33.3% of under eighteens and none of those over 64.

== Education ==
The first school Chillicothe had was a one-room school that was named Chillicothe #1, it was demolished and is no longer there. Chillicothe is within the Eddyville–Blakesburg–Fremont Community School District, formed by the 2012 merger of the Eddyville–Blakesburg Community School District and the Fremont Community School District. It previously resided in the Eddyville–Blakesburg district, which was formed in 1994 by the merger of the Eddyville Community School District and the Blakesburg Community School District.

== Infrastructure ==
On the west side of town is a large coal-burning power plant that supplies power to a large part of southeastern Iowa.
