= Highland Township, Wapello County, Iowa =

Township in Wapello County, Iowa, U.S.

Coordinates: 41.119°N 92.353°W

Highland Township is a township in Wapello County, Iowa, United States.

== History ==
Highland Township was organized in 1848.
