= Union Township, Davis County, Iowa =

Township in Iowa, USA

Union Township
- Township
- Location in Davis County
- Coordinates: 40°46′28″N 92°14′07″W
- Country: United States
- State: Iowa
- County: Davis

Area
  - Total: 36.56 sq mi (94.69 km^{2})
  - Land: 36.5 sq mi (94.6 km^{2})
  - Water: 0.035 sq mi (0.09 km^{2}) 0.1%
- Elevation: 758 ft (231 m)

Population (2000)
  - Total: 305
  - Density: 8.3/sq mi (3.2/km^{2})
- GNIS feature ID: 0468817

Union Township is a township in Davis County, Iowa, USA. As of the 2000 census, its population was 305.

== History ==
Union Township was organized in 1846.

== Geography ==
Union Township covers an area of 36.56 square miles (94.69 square kilometers); of this, 0.04 square miles (0.09 square kilometers) or 0.1 percent is water. The streams of Burr Oak Creek, Hickory Creek, Locke Branch and South Chequest Creek run through this township.

=== Unincorporated towns ===
- Dover (historical)
- Troy

(This list is based on USGS data and may include former settlements.)

=== Adjacent townships ===
- Salt Creek Township (north)
- Village Township, Van Buren County (northeast)
- Chequest Township, Van Buren County (east)
- Jackson Township, Van Buren County (southeast)
- Prairie Township (south)
- Cleveland Township (west)
- Perry Township (west)
- Lick Creek Township (northwest)

=== Cemeteries ===
The township contains seven cemeteries: Arney, Clark, Cupp Grave, Fountain, Richardson, Rouch and Troy.

=== Airports and landing strips ===
- Hooper Field
