= Sandy Sandberg =

American football player (1910–1989)

No. 90, 28, 15
- Position: Tackle

Personal information
- Born: June 14, 1910; Eddyville, Iowa, U.S.
- Died: April 10, 1989 (aged 78); St. Louis, Missouri, U.S.
- Listed height: 6 ft 2 in (1.88 m)
- Listed weight: 228 lb (103 kg)

Career information
- College: Iowa Wesleyan

Career history
- St. Louis Gunners (1934); Pittsburgh Pirates (1935–1937); Brooklyn Dodgers (1937)
- Stats at Pro Football Reference

Sigurd E. "Sandy" Sandberg (June 14, 1910 – April 10, 1989) was an American professional football tackle who played four seasons in the National Football League (NFL) with the St. Louis Gunners, Pittsburgh Pirates and Brooklyn Dodgers. He played college football at Iowa Wesleyan University.

== College career ==
Sandberg attended Iowa Wesleyan University from 1928 to 1933, where he participated in football, basketball and the discus in track. He earned All-Conference honoris in 1929, 1930 and 1931 as a tackle. He was a member of Sigma Phi Epsilon, Letter Club and Blue Key as a student. Sandberg was inducted into the Iowa Wesleyan University Athletic Hall of Fame in 2005.

== Professional career ==
Sandberg played in three games, all starts, for the NFL's St. Louis Gunners in 1934. He played in 30 games, starting 25, for the Pittsburgh Pirates of the NFL from 1935 to 1937. He played in three games, starting one, for the Brooklyn Dodgers of the NFL during the 1937 season.

== Personal life ==
Sandberg served in World War II as an infantryman in northern Italy. He was captured by the Germans in 1944 held as a prisoner of war for a year and a half before being rescued along with 30 other soldiers. He ran a plumbing company in St. Louis, Missouri after the war.
