= Kirkville, Iowa =

- City
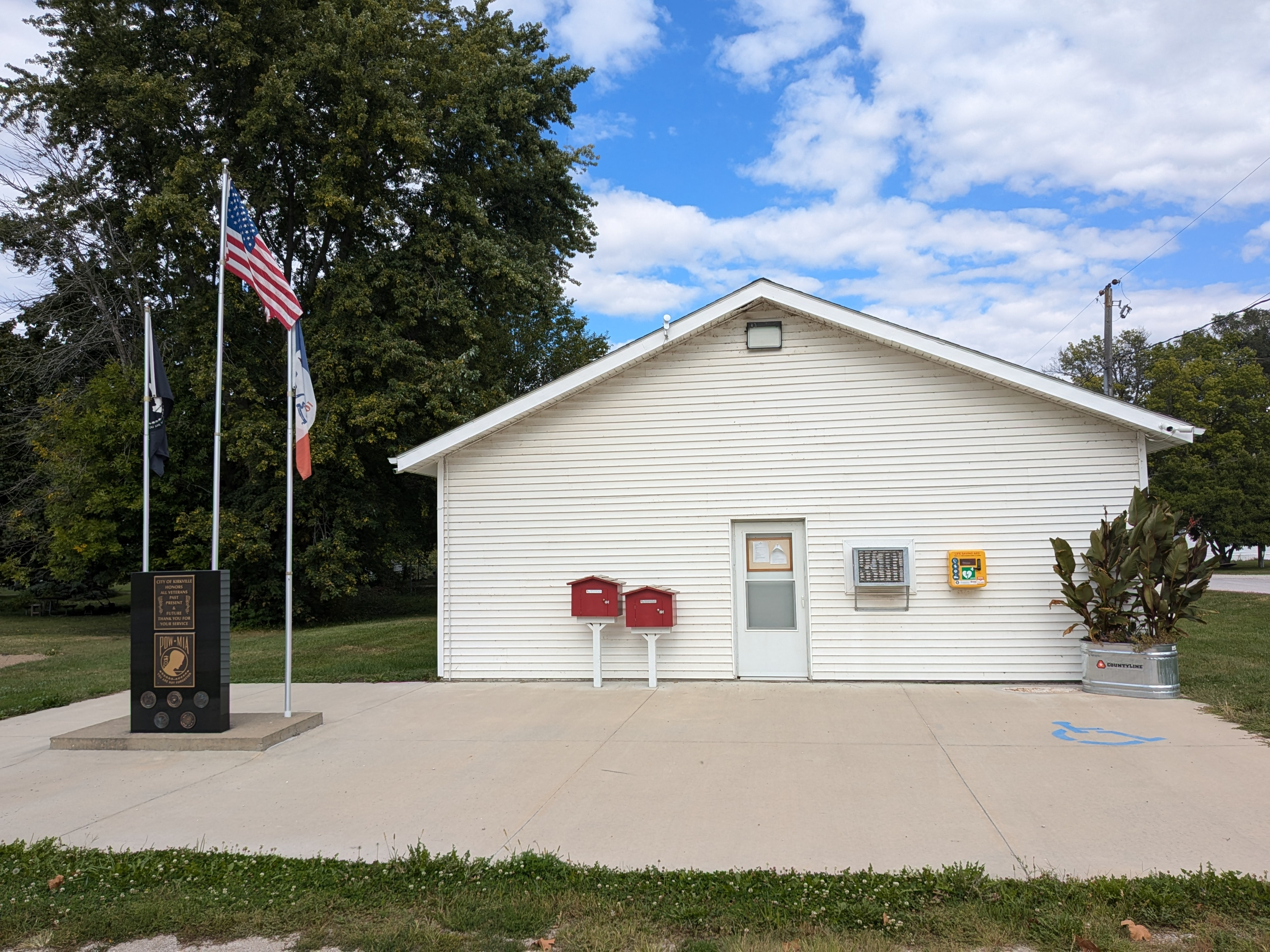
- Kirkville City Hall

- Location of Kirkville, Iowa
- Coordinates: 41°08′32″N 92°30′04″W
- Country: USA
- State: Iowa
- County: Wapello

Area
  - Total: 0.56 sq mi (1.46 km^{2})
  - Land: 0.56 sq mi (1.46 km^{2})
  - Water: 0 sq mi (0.00 km^{2})
- Elevation: 814 ft (248 m)

Population (2020)
  - Total: 157
  - Density: 278.7/sq mi (107.62/km^{2})
- Time zone: UTC-6 (Central (CST))
  - Summer (DST): UTC-5 (CDT)
- ZIP code: 52566
- Area code: 641
- FIPS code: 19-41565
- GNIS feature ID: 2395548

Kirkville is a city in Wapello County, Iowa, United States. The population was 157 at the time of the 2020 census.

== History ==
Kirkville was laid out in 1848 by John Kirkpatrick.

== Geography ==
According to the United States Census Bureau, the city has a total area of 0.56 square miles (1.45 km^{2}), all land.

== Demographics ==
Historical populations
Year	Pop.	±%
1870	236	—
1880	280	+18.6%
1890	714	+155.0%
1900	402	−43.7%
1910	299	−25.6%
1920	210	−29.8%
1930	206	−1.9%
1940	241	+17.0%
1950	213	−11.6%
1960	203	−4.7%
1970	222	+9.4%
1980	220	−0.9%
1990	177	−19.5%
2000	214	+20.9%
2010	167	−22.0%
2020	157	−6.0%
Source:"U.S. Census website". United States Census Bureau. and Iowa Data Center; Source: U.S. Decennial Census

=== 2020 census ===
As of the census of 2020, there were 157 people, 61 households, and 45 families residing in the city. The population density was 278.7 inhabitants per square mile (107.6/km^{2}). There were 71 housing units at an average density of 126.0 per square mile (48.7/km^{2}). The racial makeup of the city was 91.1% White, 0.0% Black or African American, 0.0% Native American, 0.6% Asian, 0.0% Pacific Islander, 4.5% from other races and 3.8% from two or more races. Hispanic or Latino persons of any race comprised 1.3% of the population.

Of the 61 households, 23.0% of which had children under the age of 18 living with them, 55.7% were married couples living together, 3.3% were cohabitating couples, 21.3% had a female householder with no spouse or partner present and 19.7% had a male householder with no spouse or partner present. 26.2% of all households were non-families. 24.6% of all households were made up of individuals, 16.4% had someone living alone who was 65 years old or older.

The median age in the city was 51.4 years. 15.9% of the residents were under the age of 20; 1.9% were between the ages of 20 and 24; 18.5% were from 25 and 44; 42.0% were from 45 and 64; and 21.7% were 65 years of age or older. The gender makeup of the city was 48.4% male and 51.6% female.

=== 2010 census ===
As of the census of 2010, there were 167 people, 68 households, and 46 families residing in the city. The population density was 298.2 inhabitants per square mile (115.1/km^{2}). There were 74 housing units at an average density of 132.1 per square mile (51.0/km^{2}). The racial makeup of the city was 97.6% White, 0.6% Native American, 1.2% from other races, and 0.6% from two or more races. Hispanic or Latino of any race were 1.8% of the population.

There were 68 households, of which 29.4% had children under the age of 18 living with them, 63.2% were married couples living together, 1.5% had a female householder with no husband present, 2.9% had a male householder with no wife present, and 32.4% were non-families. 23.5% of all households were made up of individuals, and 4.4% had someone living alone who was 65 years of age or older. The average household size was 2.46 and the average family size was 2.93.

The median age in the city was 43.5 years. 22.8% of residents were under the age of 18; 5.4% were between the ages of 18 and 24; 25.2% were from 25 to 44; 36% were from 45 to 64; and 10.8% were 65 years of age or older. The gender makeup of the city was 52.7% male and 47.3% female.

=== 2000 census ===
As of the census of 2000, there were 214 people, 72 households, and 60 families residing in the city. The population density was 386.2 inhabitants per square mile (149.1/km^{2}). There were 79 housing units at an average density of 142.6 per square mile (55.1/km^{2}). The racial makeup of the city was 99.53% White and 0.47% Native American. Hispanic or Latino of any race were 0.47% of the population.

There were 72 households, out of which 41.7% had children under the age of 18 living with them, 76.4% were married couples living together, 2.8% had a female householder with no husband present, and 15.3% were non-families. 9.7% of all households were made up of individuals, and 5.6% had someone living alone who was 65 years of age or older. The average household size was 2.97 and the average family size was 3.11.

In the city, the population was spread out, with 31.3% under the age of 18, 7.0% from 18 to 24, 28.0% from 25 to 44, 24.8% from 45 to 64, and 8.9% who were 65 years of age or older. The median age was 34 years. For every 100 females, there were 107.8 males. For every 100 females age 18 and over, there were 107.0 males.

The median income for a household in the city was $31,354, and the median income for a family was $31,875. Males had a median income of $30,156 versus $17,500 for females. The per capita income for the city was $14,366. About 6.3% of families and 8.5% of the population were below the poverty line, including 16.0% of those under the age of eighteen and none of those 65 or over.

== Education ==
Kirkville is within the Eddyville–Blakesburg–Fremont Community School District, formed by the 2012 merger of the Eddyville–Blakesburg Community School District and the Fremont Community School District. It previously resided in the Eddyville–Blakesburg district, which was formed in 1994 by the merger of the Eddyville Community School District and the Blakesburg Community School District.
