= Eddyville–Blakesburg–Fremont Community School District =

Public school district in Eddyville, Iowa, United States

Coordinates: 41.156594°N 92.636455°W

Location
- Eddyville, Iowa Mahaska, Monroe, Wapello, Davis and Keokuk counties United States
- Coordinates: 41.156594, -92.636455

District information
- Type: Local school district
- Grades: K–12
- Established: 2012
- Superintendent: Scott Williamson
- Schools: 4
- Budget: $15,591,000 (2020-21)
- NCES District ID: 1904950

Students and staff
- Students: 964 (2022-23)
- Teachers: 84.99 FTE
- Staff: 87.20 FTE
- Student–teacher ratio: 11.34
- Athletic conference: South Central
- District mascot: Rockets
- Colors: Black and Gold

Other information
- Website: www.rocketsk12.org

Eddyville–Blakesburg–Fremont Community School District is a rural public school district headquartered in Eddyville, Iowa.

The district is within Mahaska, Monroe, and Wapello counties, with additional small sections in Davis and Keokuk counties. It serves Eddyville, Blakesburg, Fremont, Chillicothe, and Kirkville.

== History ==
It was formed on July 1, 2012, by the merger of the Fremont Community School District and the Eddyville–Blakesburg Community School District. On September 13, 2011, the merger was approved in a referendum, with the Eddyville–Blakesburg district voters doing so on a 335–86 basis and the Fremont voters doing so on a 91–60 basis. As part of the merger plans, the pre-merger E-B and Fremont boards were to, for a period, continue to meet while a newly selected combined Eddyville–Blakesburg–Fremont board was to already begin business.

== Schools ==
- Eddyville–Blakesburg–Fremont Junior/Senior High School (Eddyville)
- Blakesburg Elementary School
- Eddyville Elementary School
- Fremont Elementary School

=== Eddyville–Blakesburg–Fremont Junior/Senior High School ===
==== Athletics ====
The Rockets participate in the South Central Conference in the following sports:

- Football
- Cross Country
- Volleyball
- Basketball
- Bowling
- Wrestling
  - 2014 Class 1A State Champions
  - 2026 Class 2A State Champions
- Golf
- Tennis
- Track and Field
  - Girls' 1993 Class 2A State Champions
- Baseball
- Softball

== See also ==
- List of school districts in Iowa
- List of high schools in Iowa
