= Blakesburg, Iowa =

- City
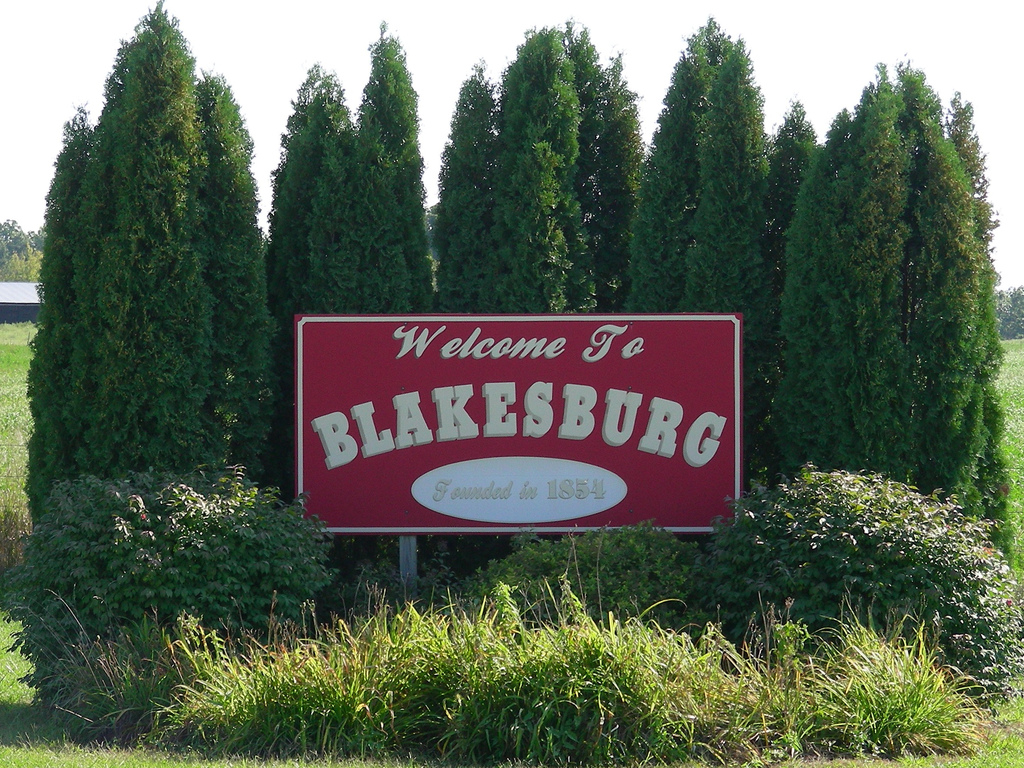
- Welcome Sign in Blakesburg
- Nickname: "The Burg"
- Location of Blakesburg, Iowa
- Coordinates: 40°57′43″N 92°38′05″W
- Country: USA
- State: Iowa
- County: Wapello

Area
  - Total: 0.27 sq mi (0.70 km^{2})
  - Land: 0.27 sq mi (0.70 km^{2})
  - Water: 0 sq mi (0.00 km^{2})
- Elevation: 912 ft (278 m)

Population (2020)
  - Total: 274
  - Density: 1,012.6/sq mi (390.98/km^{2})
- Time zone: UTC-6 (Central (CST))
  - Summer (DST): UTC-5 (CDT)
- ZIP code: 52536
- Area code: 641
- FIPS code: 19-06850
- GNIS feature ID: 2394188
- Website: cityofblakesburg.yourwebsitespace.com

Blakesburg is a city in Wapello County, Iowa, United States. The population was 274 at the 2020 census.

== History ==
Blakesburg was laid out in 1852. It was named for one of its founders, Theophilus Blake.

== Geography ==
According to the United States Census Bureau, the city has a total area of 0.27 square miles (0.70 km^{2}), all land. The ZIP code for Blakesburg is 52536.

== Demographics ==
Historical populations
Year	Pop.	±%
1860	265	—
1870	236	−10.9%
1880	198	−16.1%
1910	344	+73.7%
1920	380	+10.5%
1930	397	+4.5%
1940	442	+11.3%
1950	401	−9.3%
1960	401	+0.0%
1970	403	+0.5%
1980	404	+0.2%
1990	333	−17.6%
2000	374	+12.3%
2010	296	−20.9%
2020	274	−7.4%
Source:"U.S. Census website". United States Census Bureau. and Iowa Data Center; Source: U.S. Decennial Census

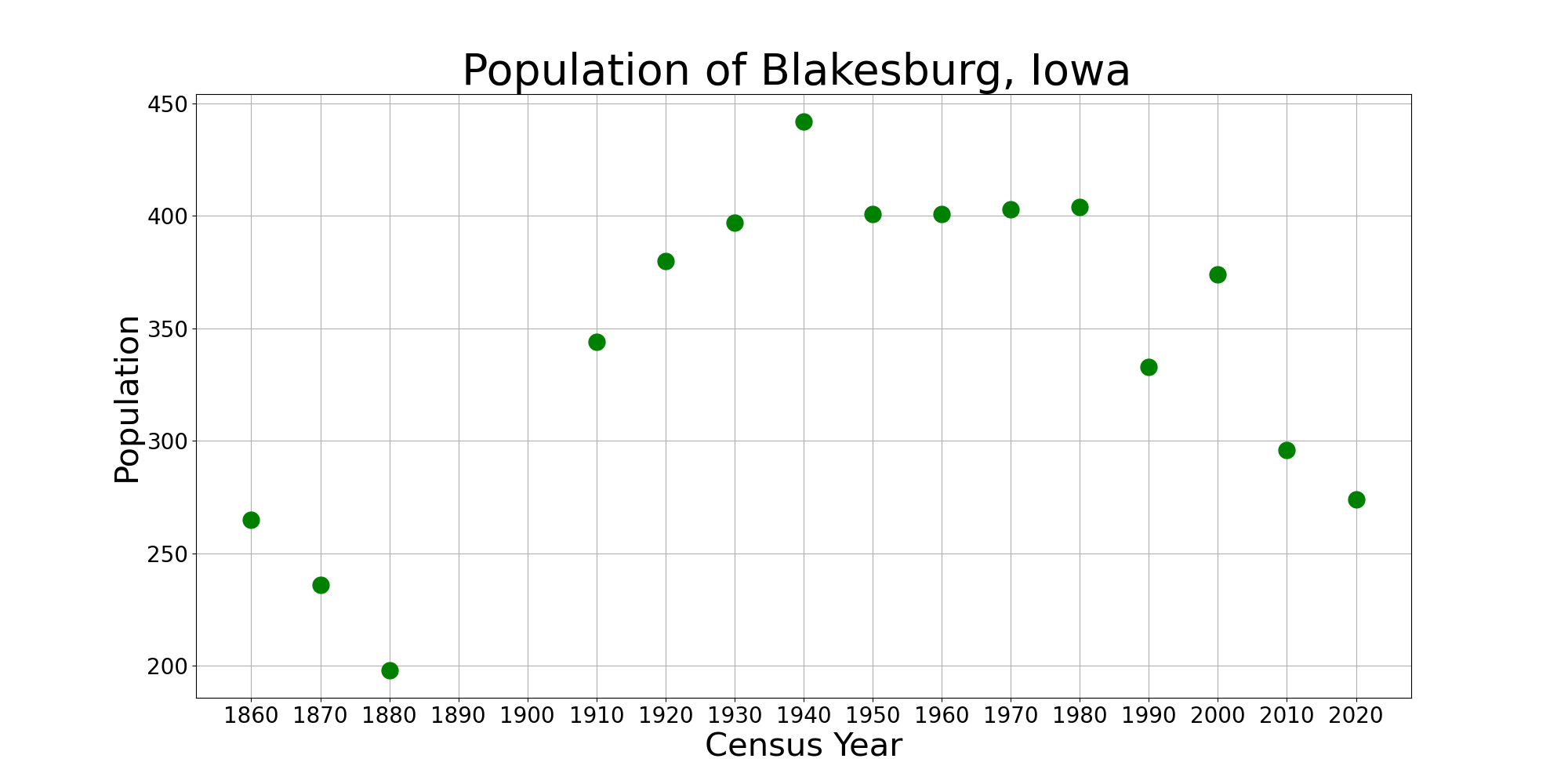
The population of Blakesburg, Iowa from US census data

=== 2020 census ===
As of the census of 2020, there were 274 people, 131 households, and 77 families residing in the city. The population density was 1,012.6 inhabitants per square mile (391.0/km^{2}). There were 150 housing units at an average density of 554.4 per square mile (214.0/km^{2}). The racial makeup of the city was 92.3% White, 0.4% Black or African American, 0.0% Native American, 0.4% Asian, 0.0% Pacific Islander, 1.5% from other races and 5.5% from two or more races. Hispanic or Latino persons of any race comprised 2.2% of the population.

Of the 131 households, 35.1% of which had children under the age of 18 living with them, 40.5% were married couples living together, 6.9% were cohabitating couples, 27.5% had a female householder with no spouse or partner present and 25.2% had a male householder with no spouse or partner present. 41.2% of all households were non-families. 35.9% of all households were made up of individuals, 19.1% had someone living alone who was 65 years old or older.

The median age in the city was 42.7 years. 26.3% of the residents were under the age of 20; 4.4% were between the ages of 20 and 24; 21.5% were from 25 and 44; 22.3% were from 45 and 64; and 25.5% were 65 years of age or older. The gender makeup of the city was 48.5% male and 51.5% female.

=== 2010 census ===
As of the census of 2010, there were 296 people, 145 households, and 84 families living in the city. The population density was 1,096.3 inhabitants per square mile (423.3/km^{2}). There were 169 housing units at an average density of 625.9 per square mile (241.7/km^{2}). The racial makeup of the city was 99.7% White and 0.3% from two or more races.

There were 145 households, of which 22.1% had children under the age of 18 living with them, 40.0% were married couples living together, 13.8% had a female householder with no husband present, 4.1% had a male householder with no wife present, and 42.1% were non-families. 33.8% of all households were made up of individuals, and 15.2% had someone living alone who was 65 years of age or older. The average household size was 2.04 and the average family size was 2.60.

The median age in the city was 48.2 years. 18.6% of residents were under the age of 18; 6.1% were between the ages of 18 and 24; 20.3% were from 25 to 44; 31.5% were from 45 to 64; and 23.6% were 65 years of age or older. The gender makeup of the city was 47.6% male and 52.4% female.

=== 2000 census ===
As of the census of 2000, there were 374 people, 166 households, and 105 families living in the city. The population density was 1,408.9 inhabitants per square mile (544.0/km^{2}). There were 177 housing units at an average density of 666.8 per square mile (257.5/km^{2}). The racial makeup of the city was 98.66% White, 0.53% Asian, and 0.80% from two or more races. Hispanic or Latino of any race were 0.53% of the population.

There were 166 households, out of which 27.1% had children under the age of 18 living with them, 48.2% were married couples living together, 11.4% had a female householder with no husband present, and 36.7% were non-families. 29.5% of all households were made up of individuals, and 16.9% had someone living alone who was 65 years of age or older. The average household size was 2.25 and the average family size was 2.78.

In the city, the population was spread out, with 21.7% under the age of 18, 10.7% from 18 to 24, 26.5% from 25 to 44, 22.7% from 45 to 64, and 18.4% who were 65 years of age or older. The median age was 38 years. For every 100 females, there were 82.4 males. For every 100 females age 18 and over, there were 80.9 males.

The median income for a household in the city was $28,500, and the median income for a family was $35,417. Males had a median income of $27,813 versus $20,313 for females. The per capita income for the city was $13,962. About 13.5% of families and 14.3% of the population were below the poverty line, including 24.4% of those under age 18 and 4.0% of those age 65 or over.

== Arts and culture ==
Airpower Museum

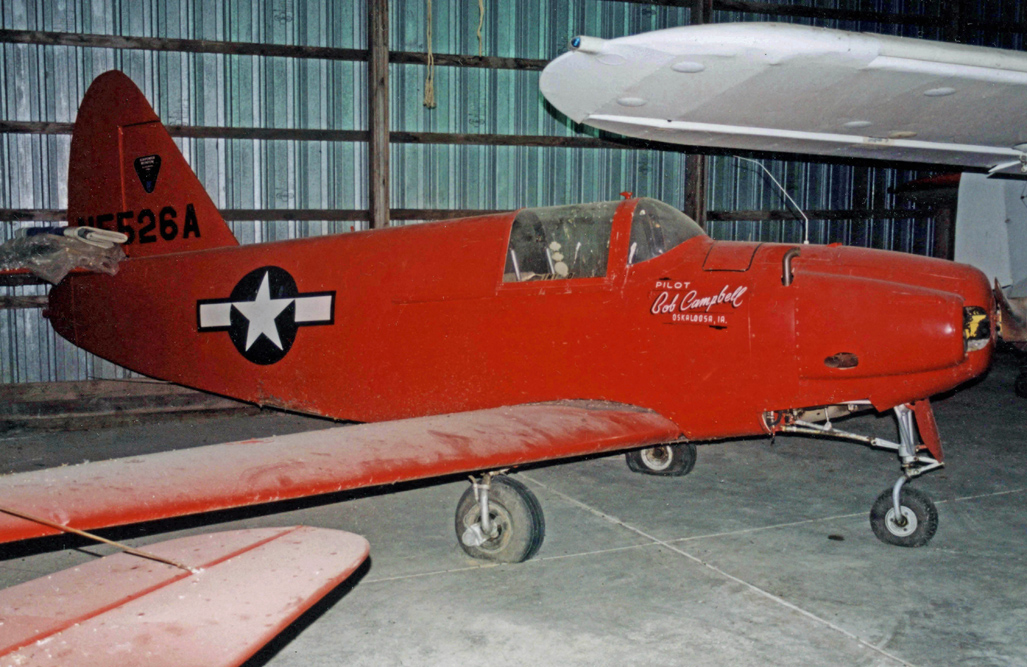
Culver PQ-14 at Airpower Museum near Blakesburg

Located three miles northeast of Blakesburg, the Airpower Museum features approximately 25 mostly pre-World War II aircraft on display as well as the Library of Flight, and early flight simulators, propellers, engines, and original art. A fly-in of vintage aircraft is held each year.

== Education ==
The Eddyville–Blakesburg–Fremont Community School District serves the community. It has one school building—Blakesburg Elementary Attendance Center—located in the community. Students grades 7–12 attend the Eddyville–Blakesburg Junior/Senior High School in neighboring Eddyville.

The district was formed by the 2012 merger of the Eddyville–Blakesburg Community School District and the Fremont Community School District. The former was formed in 1994 by the merger of the Eddyville Community School District and the Blakesburg Community School District.
