= Fremont, Iowa =

- City
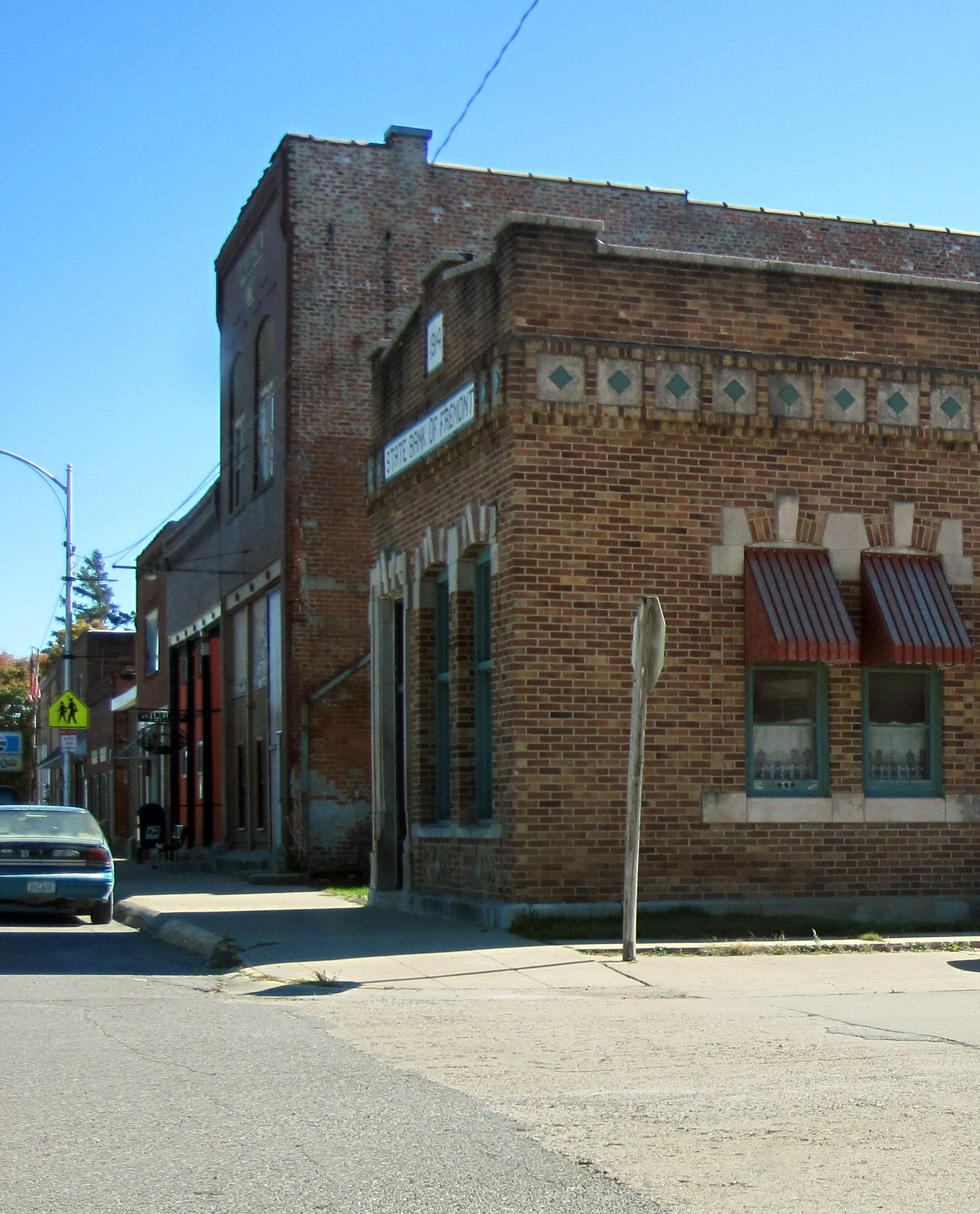
- Downtown Fremont

- Location of Fremont, Iowa
- Coordinates: 41°12′45″N 92°26′01″W
- Country: United States
- State: Iowa
- County: Mahaska

Area
  - Total: 1.06 sq mi (2.75 km^{2})
  - Land: 1.06 sq mi (2.75 km^{2})
  - Water: 0 sq mi (0.00 km^{2})
- Elevation: 837 ft (255 m)

Population (2020)
  - Total: 708
  - Density: 666.3/sq mi (257.26/km^{2})
- Time zone: UTC-6 (Central (CST))
  - Summer (DST): UTC-5 (CDT)
- ZIP code: 52561
- Area code: 641
- FIPS code: 19-29190
- GNIS feature ID: 2394824
- Website: www.fremontiowa.com

Fremont is a city in Mahaska County, Iowa, United States. The population was 708 at the time of the 2020 census.

== History ==
In 1871, Fremont stretched for 8 blocks, 1/2 mile (under 1 km) along Main Street, with at least one house on every block on the north side of the street and a few houses on Washington Street, one block north. There was a Baptist church, a hotel, three stores, a barber shop and a school. The town also had a physician, a blacksmith and a shoemaker.

The Burlington and Western, a narrow gauge railroad and its competitor, the Iowa Central Railway built parallel tracks toward Oskaloosa. The Burlington and Western arrived in the fall of 1883 and was widened to Standard Gauge in 1902 and taken over by the Chicago, Burlington and Quincy the next year. the Minneapolis and St. Louis took over the Iowa Central around the same time. The Burlington line was abandoned in 1934.

In 1905, Fremont had a grain elevator, live-stock pens, and a lumber yard on clustered around the Burlington depot on the south side of town, and a creamery, another stockyard, and grain elevator spread out on both sides of the Iowa Central depot along the north-east side. The school and hotel were on Main Street, and the post office was half a block north of Main.

== Geography ==
According to the United States Census Bureau, the city has a total area of 1.03 square miles (2.67 km^{2}), all of it land.

== Demographics ==
Historical populations
Year	Pop.	±%
1880	143	—
1900	542	+279.0%
1910	501	−7.6%
1920	544	+8.6%
1930	450	−17.3%
1940	490	+8.9%
1950	471	−3.9%
1960	461	−2.1%
1970	480	+4.1%
1980	730	+52.1%
1990	701	−4.0%
2000	704	+0.4%
2010	743	+5.5%
2020	708	−4.7%
Source:"U.S. Census website". United States Census Bureau. and Iowa Data Center; Source: U.S. Decennial Census

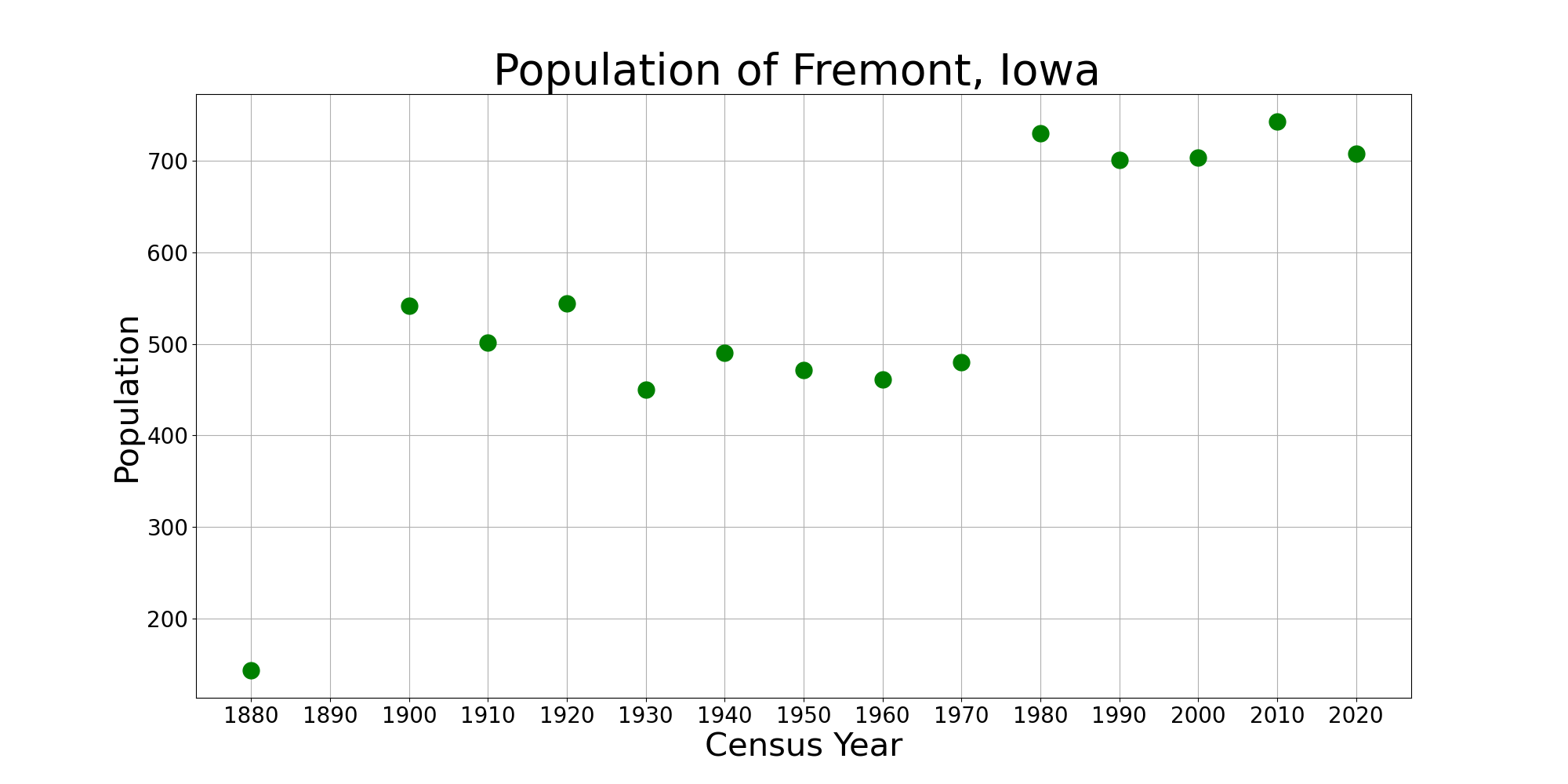
The population of Fremont, Iowa from US census data

=== 2020 census ===
As of the census of 2020, there were 708 people, 285 households, and 194 families residing in the city. The population density was 666.3 inhabitants per square mile (257.3/km^{2}). There were 320 housing units at an average density of 301.2 per square mile (116.3/km^{2}). The racial makeup of the city was 96.0% White, 0.6% Black or African American, 0.1% Native American, 0.0% Asian, 0.0% Pacific Islander, 0.1% from other races and 3.1% from two or more races. Hispanic or Latino persons of any race comprised 2.4% of the population.

Of the 285 households, 34.4% of which had children under the age of 18 living with them, 48.4% were married couples living together, 12.3% were cohabiting couples, 18.2% had a female householder with no spouse or partner present and 21.1% had a male householder with no spouse or partner present. 31.9% of all households were non-families. 24.2% of all households were made up of individuals, 9.5% had someone living alone who was 65 years old or older.

The median age in the city was 38.9 years. 26.4% of the residents were under the age of 20; 6.9% were between the ages of 20 and 24; 26.3% were from 25 and 44; 24.0% were from 45 and 64; and 16.4% were 65 years of age or older. The gender makeup of the city was 52.4% male and 47.6% female.

=== 2010 census ===
As of the census of 2010, there were 743 people, 300 households, and 208 families living in the city. The population density was 721.4 inhabitants per square mile (278.5/km^{2}). There were 327 housing units at an average density of 317.5 per square mile (122.6/km^{2}). The racial makeup of the city was 98.7% White, 0.1% African American, 0.7% Asian, and 0.5% from two or more races. Hispanic or Latino of any race were 0.4% of the population.

There were 300 households, of which 33.0% had children under the age of 18 living with them, 55.0% were married couples living together, 10.0% had a female householder with no husband present, 4.3% had a male householder with no wife present, and 30.7% were non-families. 26.7% of all households were made up of individuals, and 11.7% had someone living alone who was 65 years of age or older. The average household size was 2.48 and the average family size was 2.98.

The median age in the city was 37.5 years. 26.6% of residents were under the age of 18; 7% were between the ages of 18 and 24; 25.2% were from 25 to 44; 25.2% were from 45 to 64; and 16% were 65 years of age or older. The gender makeup of the city was 51.1% male and 48.9% female.

=== 2000 census ===
As of the census of 2000, there were 704 people, 283 households, and 198 families living in the city. The population density was 682.7 inhabitants per square mile (263.6/km^{2}). There were 300 housing units at an average density of 290.9 per square mile (112.3/km^{2}). The racial makeup of the city was 99.43% White, 0.14% from other races, and 0.43% from two or more races. Hispanic or Latino of any race were 0.28% of the population.

There were 283 households, out of which 33.2% had children under the age of 18 living with them, 62.2% were married couples living together, 6.4% had a female householder with no husband present, and 29.7% were non-families. 25.1% of all households were made up of individuals, and 14.5% had someone living alone who was 65 years of age or older. The average household size was 2.49 and the average family size was 2.95.

26.6% are under the age of 18, 9.2% from 18 to 24, 25.0% from 25 to 44, 21.0% from 45 to 64, and 18.2% who were 65 years of age or older. The median age was 36 years. For every 100 females, there were 92.3 males. For every 100 females age 18 and over, there were 91.5 males.

The median income for a household in the city was $39,583, and the median income for a family was $44,167. Males had a median income of $33,333 versus $26,250 for females. The per capita income for the city was $16,925. About 5.9% of families and 8.9% of the population were below the poverty line, including 12.6% of those under age 18 and 5.5% of those age 65 or over.

== Education ==
It is within the Eddyville–Blakesburg–Fremont Community School District, formed by the 2012 merger of the Fremont Community School District and the Eddyville–Blakesburg Community School District.

== Notable people ==
- Steve Bales – flight control engineer for NASA's Apollo 11 mission
- Ivan Combe – founder of Combe, Inc., creator of Clearasil, Odor Eaters, and leader in the Consumer Health Care industry
- Herschel C. Loveless – 34th governor of Iowa
