= Knoxville Community School District =

Public school district in Knoxville, Iowa, United States

Location
- Knoxville, Iowa Marion County United States
- Coordinates: 41.3192°N 93.10152°W

District information
- Type: Local school district
- Motto: Lead. Commit. Achieve.
- Grades: K-12
- Superintendent: Cassi Pearson
- Schools: 4
- Budget: $27,677,000 (2020-21)
- NCES District ID: 1915840

Students and staff
- Students: 1,674 (2022-23)
- Teachers: 122.21 FTE
- Staff: 149.97 FTE
- Student–teacher ratio: 13.70
- Athletic conference: South Central
- District mascot: Panthers
- Colors: Black and Gold

Other information
- Website: www.knoxville.k12.ia.us

The Knoxville Community School District is a rural public school district headquartered in Knoxville, Iowa.

The district is completely within Marion County, and serves the city of Knoxville, the town of Harvey, and the surrounding rural areas.

The school's athletic teams are the Panthers, and their colors are black and gold.

== Schools ==
The district operates four schools, all in Knoxville:

- Northstar Elementary School
- West Elementary School
- Knoxville Middle School
- Knoxville High School

=== Knoxville High School ===
==== Athletics ====
The Panthers participate in the South Central Conference in the following sports.

- Football
- Cross Country
  - Boys' 2-time Class A State Champions (1939, 1980)
- Volleyball
- Basketball
- Bowling
- Wrestling
- Golf boys state champion runner up 2023
  - Girls' 1964 State Champions
- Tennis
  - Boys' 2001 Class 1A State Champions
- Track and Field
  - Boys' 1991 Class 3A State Champions
- Baseball
  - 2002 Class 3A State Champions
- Softball

== See also ==
- List of school districts in Iowa
- List of high schools in Iowa
