= Perry Township, Davis County, Iowa =

Perry Township
- Township
- Location in Davis County
- Coordinates: 40°46′24″N 92°20′32″W
- Country: United States
- State: Iowa
- County: Davis

Area
  - Total: 29.14 sq mi (75.48 km^{2})
  - Land: 29.13 sq mi (75.45 km^{2})
  - Water: 0.012 sq mi (0.03 km^{2}) 0.04%
- Elevation: 837 ft (255 m)

Population (2000)
  - Total: 333
  - Density: 11/sq mi (4.4/km^{2})
- GNIS feature ID: 0468507

Perry Township is a township in Davis County, Iowa, USA. As of the 2000 census, its population was 333.

== History ==
Perry Township was organized in 1846. It is named for Matthew C. Perry.

== Geography ==
Perry Township covers an area of 29.14 square miles (75.48 square kilometers); of this, 0.01 square miles (0.03 square kilometers) or 0.04 percent is water. The stream of Butter Creek runs through this township.

=== Unincorporated towns ===
- Shunem

(This list is based on USGS data and may include former settlements.)

=== Adjacent townships ===
- Lick Creek Township (north)
- Salt Creek Township (northeast)
- Union Township (east)
- Prairie Township (southeast)
- Cleveland Township (southwest)
- Soap Creek Township (northwest)

=== Cemeteries ===
The township contains four cemeteries: Pewter, Shunem, Stark and White.

=== Major highways ===
- U.S. Route 63
