= Center Township, Wapello County, Iowa =

Township in Wapello County, Iowa, U.S.

Coordinates: 41.0203°N 92.4454°W

Center Township is a township in Wapello County, Iowa, United States. It has a land area of 49.7 square miles. The county seat of Ottumwa is located in this township.

== History ==
Center Township was organized in 1844.
