= Columbia Township, Wapello County, Iowa =

Township in Wapello County, Iowa, US

Coordinates: 41.1230°N 92.5875°W

Columbia Township is a township in Wapello County, Iowa, United States.

== History ==
Columbia Township was organized in 1844.
