= Wapello County, Iowa =

County in Iowa, United States

- County
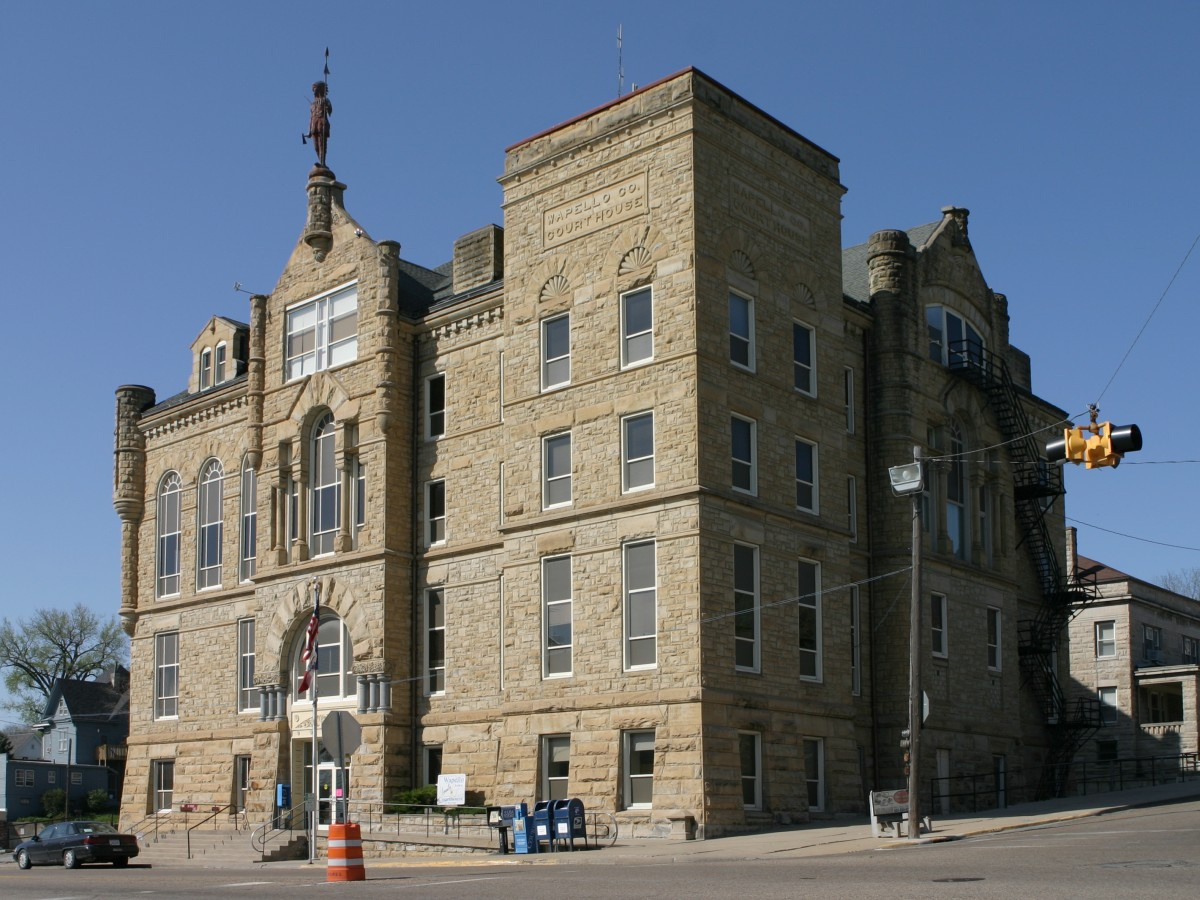
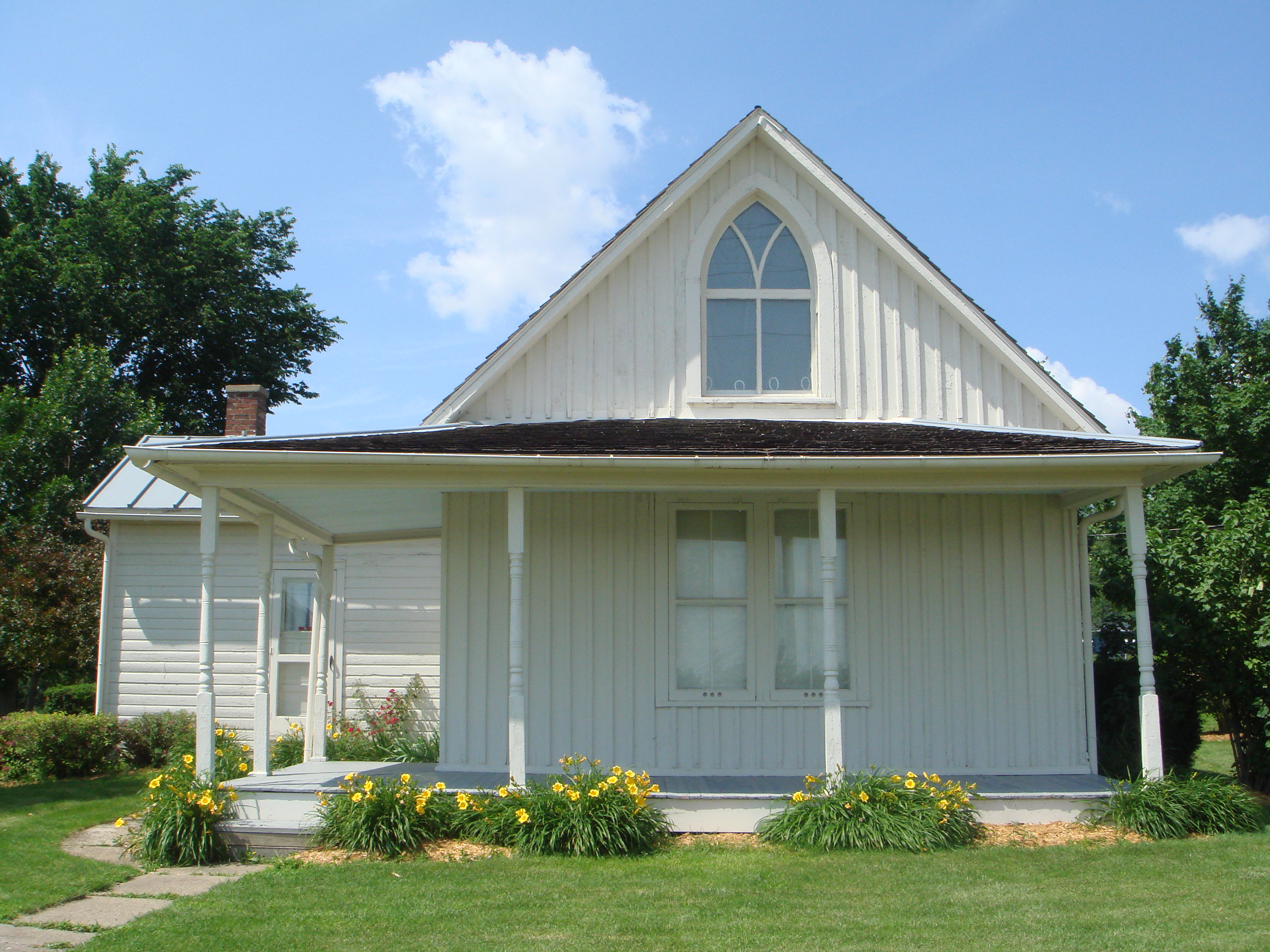
- Wapello County Courthouse American Gothic House in Eldon Des Moines River and the Bridge View Center

- Seal

- Location within the U.S. state of Iowa
- Coordinates: 41°01′46″N 92°24′32″W
- Country: United States
- State: Iowa
- Founded: 1843
- Named for: Wapello
- Seat: Ottumwa
- Largest city: Ottumwa

Area
  - Total: 436 sq mi (1,130 km^{2})
  - Land: 432 sq mi (1,120 km^{2})
  - Water: 4.2 sq mi (11 km^{2}) 1.0%

Population (2020)
  - Total: 35,437
  - Estimate (2025): 35,210 ▼
  - Density: 82.0/sq mi (31.7/km^{2})
- Time zone: UTC−6 (Central)
  - Summer (DST): UTC−5 (CDT)
- Congressional district: 3rd
- Website: www.wapellocounty.org
- Iowa county number 90

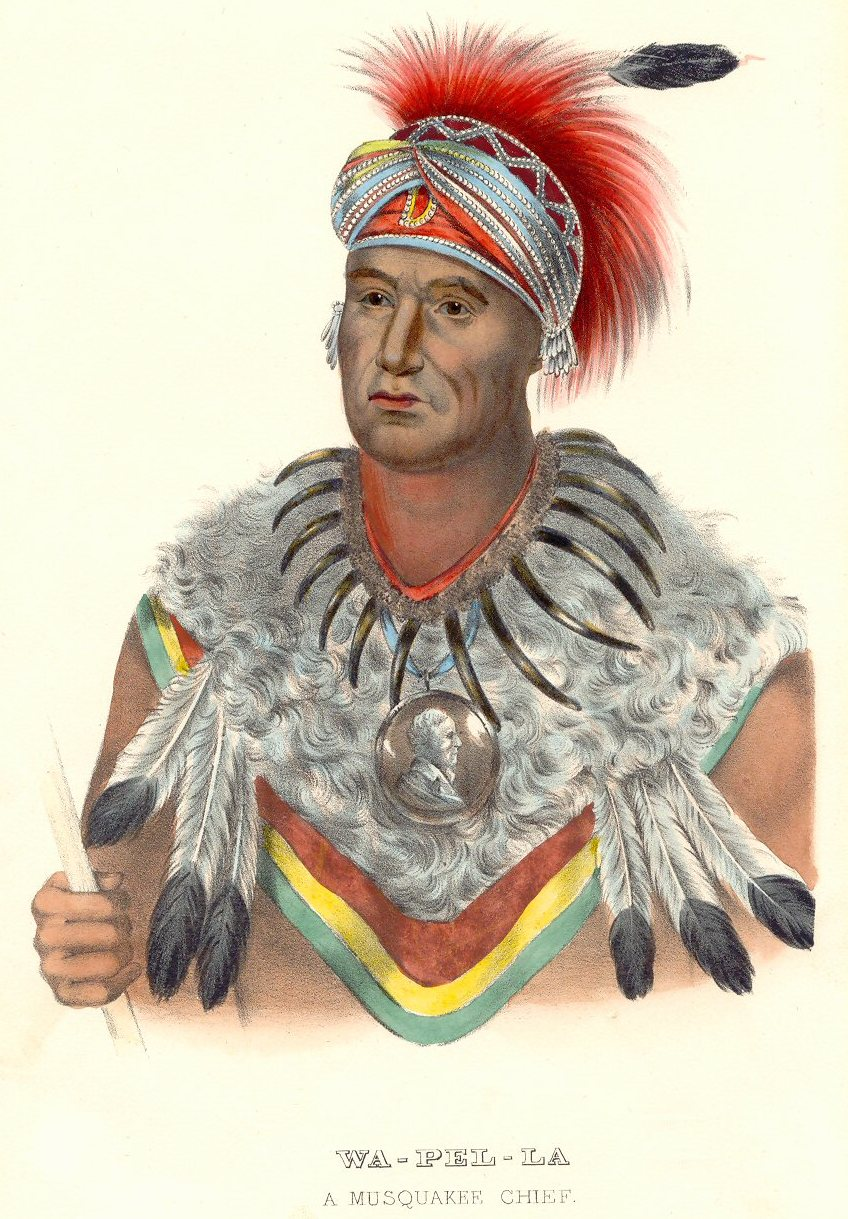
Chief Wapello; "Wa-pel-la the Prince, Musquakee Chief", from History of the Indian Tribes of North America.

Wapello County (/ˈwɑːpəloʊ/ WAH-pə-low) is a county located in the U.S. state of Iowa. As of the 2020 census, the population was 35,437. The county seat and the largest city is Ottumwa. The county was formed on February 17, 1843, and named for Wapello, a Meskwaki chief.

Wapello County is included in the Ottumwa, IA Micropolitan statistical area.

== Geography ==
According to the United States Census Bureau, the county has a total area of 436 square miles (1,130 km^{2}), of which 432 square miles (1,120 km^{2}) is land and 4.2 square miles (11 km^{2}) (1.0%) is water.

=== Major highways ===
- U.S. Highway 34
- U.S. Highway 63
- Iowa Highway 16
- Iowa Highway 137
- Iowa Highway 149

=== Transit ===
- Ottumwa station
- Ottumwa Transit Authority

=== Adjacent counties ===
- Mahaska County (northwest)
- Keokuk County (northeast)
- Jefferson County (east)
- Davis County (south)
- Monroe County (west)

== Demographics ==
Historical population
Census	Pop.	Note	%±
1850	8,471		—
1860	14,518		71.4%
1870	22,346		53.9%
1880	25,285		13.2%
1890	30,426		20.3%
1900	35,426		16.4%
1910	37,743		6.5%
1920	37,937		0.5%
1930	40,480		6.7%
1940	44,280		9.4%
1950	47,397		7.0%
1960	46,126		−2.7%
1970	42,149		−8.6%
1980	40,241		−4.5%
1990	35,696		−11.3%
2000	36,051		1.0%
2010	35,625		−1.2%
2020	35,437		−0.5%
2025 (est.)	35,210	▼	−0.6%
U.S. Decennial Census; 1790–1960 1900–1990; 1990–2000 2010–2020

=== 2020 census ===
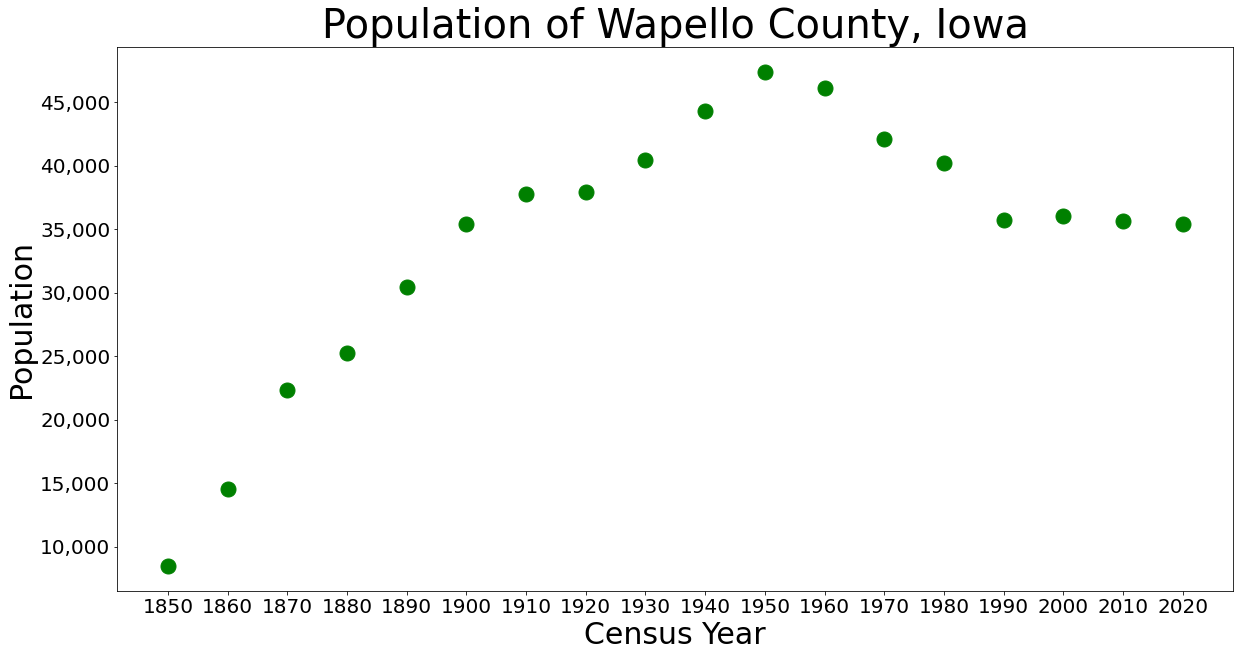
Population of Wapello County from the U.S. census data

As of the 2020 census, the county had a population of 35,437 and a population density of 81.2/sq mi (31.4/km^{2}).

The median age was 39.1 years, with 24.0% of residents under the age of 18 and 18.7% aged 65 or older. For every 100 females there were 99.3 males, and for every 100 females age 18 and over there were 96.6 males.

The racial makeup of the county was 79.5% White, 4.1% Black or African American, 0.7% American Indian and Alaska Native, 1.8% Asian, 1.5% Native Hawaiian and Pacific Islander, 6.7% from some other race, and 5.7% from two or more races. Hispanic or Latino residents of any race comprised 12.2% of the population.

Wapello County Racial Composition
Race	Number	Percent
White (NH)	27,295	77.02%
Black or African American (NH)	1,443	4.1%
Native American (NH)	66	0.2%
Asian (NH)	622	1.8%
Pacific Islander (NH)	518	1.5%
Other/Mixed (NH)	1,161	3.3%
Hispanic or Latino	4,332	12.22%

70.6% of residents lived in urban areas, while 29.4% lived in rural areas.

There were 14,167 households in the county, of which 29.3% had children under the age of 18 living in them. Of all households, 44.8% were married-couple households, 20.0% were households with a male householder and no spouse or partner present, and 27.4% were households with a female householder and no spouse or partner present. About 30.9% of all households were made up of individuals and 14.6% had someone living alone who was 65 years of age or older.

There were 15,734 housing units, of which 14,167 were occupied, leaving a 10.0% vacancy rate. Among occupied housing units, 69.7% were owner-occupied and 30.3% were renter-occupied. The homeowner vacancy rate was 1.9% and the rental vacancy rate was 11.3%.

=== 2010 census ===
As of the 2010 census recorded a population of 35,625 in the county, with a population density of 82.5/sq mi (31.9/km^{2}). There were 16,098 housing units, of which 14,552 were occupied.

=== 2000 census ===
As of the 2000 census, there were 36,051 people, 14,784 households, and 9,801 families residing in the county. The population density was 84 people per square mile (32 people/km^{2}). There were 15,873 housing units at an average density of 37 units per square mile (14 units/km^{2}). The racial makeup of the county was 96.28% White, 0.93% Black or African American, 0.28% Native American, 0.65% Asian, 0.02% Pacific Islander, 1.05% from other races, and 0.79% from two or more races. 2.22% of the population were Hispanic or Latino of any race.

There were 14,784 households, out of which 28.80% had children under the age of 18 living with them, 52.70% were married couples living together, 9.90% had a female householder with no husband present, and 33.70% were non-families. 28.20% of all households were made up of individuals, and 13.40% had someone living alone who was 65 years of age or older. The average household size was 2.37 and the average family size was 2.89.

In the county, the population was spread out, with 23.30% under the age of 18, 9.70% from 18 to 24, 26.00% from 25 to 44, 23.30% from 45 to 64, and 17.80% who were 65 years of age or older. The median age was 39 years. For every 100 females there were 94.80 males. For every 100 females age 18 and over, there were 91.70 males.

The median income for a household in the county was $32,188, and the median income for a family was $39,224. Males had a median income of $31,346 versus $21,286 for females. The per capita income for the county was $16,500. About 9.40% of families and 13.20% of the population were below the poverty line, including 18.00% of those under age 18 and 7.90% of those age 65 or over.

== Communities ==
=== Cities ===
- Agency
- Blakesburg
- Chillicothe
- Eddyville
- Eldon
- Kirkville
- Ottumwa

=== Unincorporated communities ===
- Ashland
- Bidwell
- Bladensburg
- Cliffland
- Dahlonega
- Dudley
- Farson
- Munterville
- Phillips
- Pickwick
- Ottumwa Junction
- Rutledge
- Willard
- Yampa

=== Townships ===
- Adams
- Agency
- Cass
- Center
- Columbia
- Competine
- Dahlonega
- Green
- Highland
- Keokuk
- Pleasant
- Polk
- Richland
- Washington

=== Population ranking ===
The population ranking of the following table is based on the 2020 census of Wapello County.

† county seat

Rank	City/Town/etc.	Municipal type	Population (2020 Census)	Population (2024 Estimate)
1	† Ottumwa	City	25,529	25,544
2	Eddyville (partially in Mahaska and Monroe Counties)	City	970	984
3	Eldon	City	783	767
4	Agency	City	620	623
5	Blakesburg	City	274	279
6	Kirkville	City	157	155
7	Chillicothe	City	76	69

== Politics ==
Between 1864 and 1928, Wapello County backed the Republican candidate in every election except 1912, when former Republican Theodore Roosevelt ran as the Progressive candidate, fracturing the Republican party and allowing Democrat Woodrow Wilson to take the county with a plurality of the vote of less than 37%. From 1932 to 2012, the county voted Democratic in every election except two, the nationwide Republican landslides of Dwight D. Eisenhower in 1952 and Richard Nixon in 1972. So Democratic was the county that it was the only county in Iowa to give Jimmy Carter an outright majority of its votes in his 1980 landslide loss. Beginning in 2016, Wapello County has shifted back to the Republican column, as Donald Trump carried the county in each of his three runs, winning by a margin of over 20% in 2016 and over 23% in 2020, and over 31% in 2024. Also in 2024, Trump became the first candidate from any party to obtain at least 65% of the county's vote since Lyndon B. Johnson in 1964, and the first Republican to do so since Herbert Hoover in 1928.

United States presidential election results for Wapello County, Iowa
Year	Republican		Democratic		Third party(ies)	
Year	No.	%	No.	%	No.	%
1896	4,319	50.75%	4,041	47.49%	150	1.76%
1900	4,742	53.21%	3,902	43.78%	268	3.01%
1904	4,912	60.60%	2,473	30.51%	720	8.88%
1908	4,541	50.69%	3,724	41.57%	694	7.75%
1912	2,755	32.53%	3,102	36.62%	2,613	30.85%
1916	4,398	47.65%	3,994	43.28%	837	9.07%
1920	9,884	67.99%	4,131	28.42%	522	3.59%
1924	9,870	56.96%	3,039	17.54%	4,420	25.51%
1928	11,586	66.10%	5,793	33.05%	149	0.85%
1932	7,256	42.49%	9,504	55.66%	316	1.85%
1936	7,647	41.31%	10,578	57.14%	287	1.55%
1940	9,039	43.03%	11,880	56.56%	87	0.41%
1944	8,244	43.19%	10,732	56.22%	113	0.59%
1948	7,875	41.50%	10,841	57.13%	260	1.37%
1952	11,571	52.24%	10,449	47.17%	130	0.59%
1956	10,401	48.65%	10,960	51.26%	20	0.09%
1960	11,036	49.79%	11,116	50.15%	15	0.07%
1964	5,524	28.26%	13,971	71.48%	51	0.26%
1968	7,825	41.96%	9,375	50.28%	1,447	7.76%
1972	9,301	51.19%	8,348	45.94%	522	2.87%
1976	6,786	39.30%	10,249	59.35%	233	1.35%
1980	7,475	42.31%	8,923	50.50%	1,270	7.19%
1984	7,098	39.88%	10,545	59.24%	157	0.88%
1988	5,350	34.14%	10,177	64.93%	146	0.93%
1992	4,852	30.17%	8,670	53.91%	2,561	15.92%
1996	4,828	32.69%	8,437	57.12%	1,505	10.19%
2000	6,313	41.70%	8,355	55.19%	471	3.11%
2004	7,403	44.31%	9,125	54.62%	179	1.07%
2008	6,663	41.80%	8,820	55.33%	457	2.87%
2012	6,789	43.05%	8,663	54.93%	318	2.02%
2016	8,715	57.53%	5,594	36.93%	840	5.54%
2020	9,516	60.87%	5,821	37.24%	296	1.89%
2024	9,479	65.00%	4,896	33.57%	208	1.43%

== Education ==
School districts include:

- Cardinal Community School District
- Eddyville-Blakesburg-Fremont Community School District - Formed on July 1, 2012.
- Fairfield Community School District
- Ottumwa Community School District
- Pekin Community School District

Former school districts:

- Eddyville-Blakesburg Community School District - Merged into Eddyville-Blakesburg-Fremont on July 1, 2012.
- Fremont Community School District - Merged into Eddyville-Blakesburg-Fremont on July 1, 2012.

== See also ==
- Big 4 Fair Art Hall, located at the Wapello County Fairgrounds
- Wapello County Courthouse
- National Register of Historic Places listings in Wapello County, Iowa
