= Polk Township, Wapello County, Iowa =

Township in Wapello County, Iowa, U.S.

Coordinates: 41.026°N 92.585°W

Polk Township is a township in Wapello County, Iowa, United States.

== History ==
Polk Township was organized in 1846.
