= Dahlonega Township, Wapello County, Iowa =

Township in Wapello County, Iowa, U.S.

Coordinates: 41.0535°N 92.3433°W

Dahlonega Township is a township in Wapello County, Iowa, United States.

== History ==
Dahlonega Township was organized in 1844.
