= Eddyville–Blakesburg Community School District =

Former school district in Iowa

Eddyville–Blakesburg Community School District (EBCSD) was a school district headquartered in Eddyville, Iowa.

The district was within Mahaska, Monroe, and Wapello counties, with an additional small section in Davis County. It served Eddyville, Blakesburg, Chillicothe, and Kirkville.

== History ==
It formed on July 1, 1994, by the merger of the Eddyville Community School District and the Blakesburg Community School District. Around that time officials from those two districts asked the officials of the Fremont Community School District if they were interested in merging too. At that time Fremont did not join them, but by 2011 the new E-B district and Fremont were in discussions on whether to merge. Fremont and E-B had been in a grade-sharing agreement since circa 1989.

In 2012, the E-B board voted to build a new elementary school in Blakesburg, something Ed Glenn, the president of the school board, voted against.

On Tuesday, September 13, 2011, the merger was approved in a referendum, with the E-B district voters doing so on a 335–86 basis and the Fremont voters doing so on a 91–60 basis. On July 1, 2012, E-B merged with the Fremont district to form the Eddyville–Blakesburg–Fremont Community School District. As part of the merger plans, the pre-merger E-B and Fremont boards were to, for a period, continue to meet while a newly selected combined EBF board was to already begin business.

== Schools ==
Schools included:

- Eddyville–Blakesburg Jr./Sr. High (grades 7–12) - Eddyville
- Blakesburg Middle Attendance Center (grades 5–8)
- Blakesburg Elementary Attendance Center (pre-K–4)
- Eddyville Elementary Attendance Center (pre-K–4)

Circa 2010 the middle school was now in Eddyville instead of Blakesburg.
