= Green Township, Wapello County, Iowa =

Township in Wapello County, Iowa, U.S.

Coordinates: 40.9303°N 92.4700°W

Green Township is a township in Wapello County, Iowa, United States.

== History ==
Green Township was organized in 1844.
