= Washington Township, Wapello County, Iowa =

Township in Wapello County, Iowa, U.S.

Coordinates: 40.944°N 92.237°W

Washington Township is a township in Wapello County, Iowa, United States.

== History ==
Established in 1844, Washington Township was the first township to be organized in Wapello County.
