= Keokuk Township, Wapello County, Iowa =

Township in Wapello County, Iowa, U.S.

Coordinates: 40.943°N 92.392°W

Keokuk Township is a township in Wapello County, Iowa, United States.

== History ==
Keokuk Township was organized in 1846.
