= Bladensburg, Iowa =

- Unincorporated community
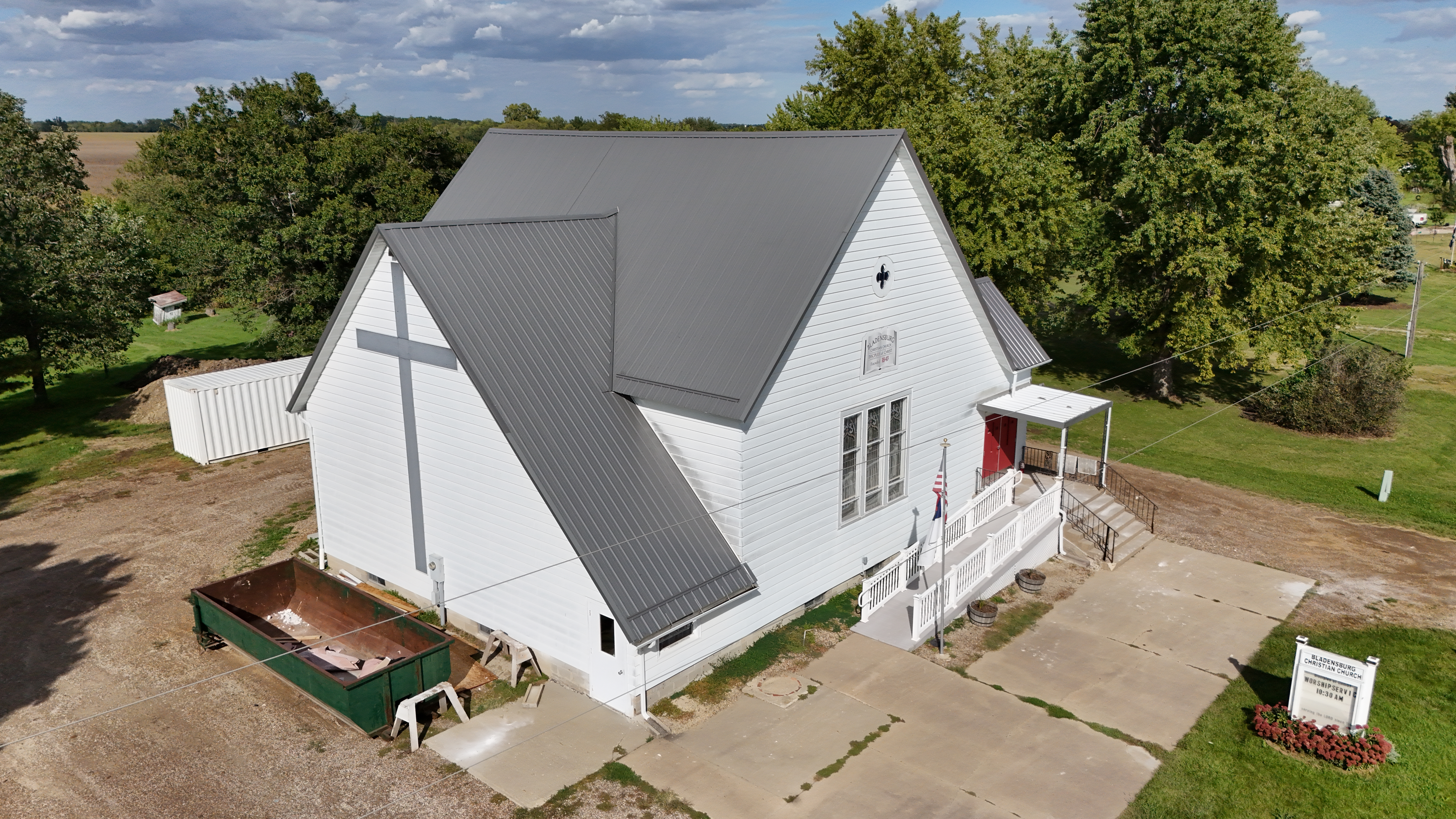
- Bladensburg Christian Church

- Location within Iowa
- Coordinates: 41°02′46″N 92°14′14″W
- Country: United States
- State: Iowa
- County: Wapello
- Elevation: 761 ft (232 m)
- Time zone: UTC-6 (Central (CST))
  - Summer (DST): UTC-5 (CDT)
- Area code: 641
- GNIS feature ID: 454670

Bladensburg is a small unincorporated community in Wapello County, Iowa, United States. It lies midway between Agency and Batavia at a distance of five miles (8.0 km) from each, and the largest nearby city is Ottumwa, seven miles (11 km) to the west-southwest.

== History ==
The village of Bladensburg was established in 1853. It had a post office from 1855 to 1906.

Bladensburg's population was 82 in 1902, and 39 in 1925. The population was 39 in 1940.
