= Fremont Community School District =

Former school district in Iowa

Fremont Community School District was a school district headquartered in Fremont, Iowa. It operated a single K-8 school in that town, while since around the 1990s, it sent its high school students to Eddyville–Blakesburg Community School District (EBCSD or E-B) schools.

== History ==
On July 1, 1991, the Fremont district absorbed a portion of the Hedrick Community School District, involuntarily dissolved by the State of Iowa on that day.

Around 1994, when the Eddyville and Blakesburg school districts were merging into the E-B district, officials from those two districts asked the officials of the Fremont district if they were interested in merging too. At that time Fremont did not join them, but by 2011 the new E-B district and Fremont were in discussions on whether to merge. Fremont and E-B had been in a grade-sharing agreement since circa 1989.

On September 13, 2011, the merger was approved in a referendum, with the E-B district voters doing so on a 335–86 basis and the Fremont voters doing so on a 91–60 basis. On July 1, 2012, E-B merged with the Fremont district to form the Eddyville–Blakesburg–Fremont Community School District. As part of the merger plans, the pre-merger E-B and Fremont boards were to, for a period, continue to meet while a newly selected combined EBF board was to already begin business.
