= National Register of Historic Places listings in Monroe County, Iowa =

Location of Monroe County in Iowa

This is a list of the National Register of Historic Places listings in Monroe County, Iowa.

This is intended to be a complete list of the properties and districts on the National Register of Historic Places in Monroe County, Iowa, United States. Latitude and longitude coordinates are provided for many National Register properties and districts; these locations may be seen together in a map.

There are 11 properties and districts listed on the National Register in the county.

This National Park Service list is complete through NPS recent listings posted March 21, 2025.

	Name on the Register	Image	Date listed	Location	City or town	Description
1	Albia Square and Central Commercial Historic District	Albia Square and Central Commercial Historic District	January 3, 1985 (#85000007)	Roughly bounded by the alley of S. and N. Clinton, E. and W. A Ave., N. and S. 2nd St., and E. and W. 2nd Ave. 41°01′36″N 92°48′26″W	Albia	
2	Brick Gothic House		April 14, 1994 (#94000351)	1.25 miles south of Albia, 0.75 miles east of Iowa Highway 5, and 0.5 miles west of County Road T35; 40°59′30″N 92°48′13″W	Albia	
3	Buxton Historic Townsite	Buxton Historic Townsite	August 9, 1983 (#83000392)	Address Restricted	Lovilia	
4	Clark Round Barn		June 30, 1986 (#86001465)	County Road T7H; 40°58′46″N 92°52′50″W	Tyrone	
5	Elbert-Bates House	Elbert-Bates House	June 27, 1985 (#85001379)	106 2nd Ave., W. 41°01′30″N 92°48′34″W	Albia	
6	Dr. George A. Jenkins House	Dr. George A. Jenkins House	February 5, 1987 (#87000027)	223 S. C St. 41°01′27″N 92°48′43″W	Albia	
7	Monroe County Courthouse	Monroe County Courthouse	July 2, 1981 (#81000258)	Main St. 41°01′45″N 92°48′26″W	Albia	
8	Noble-Kendall House	Noble-Kendall House	April 12, 1984 (#84001289)	209 E. Benton Ave. 41°01′38″N 92°48′18″W	Albia	
9	T.B. Perry House	T.B. Perry House	July 14, 1983 (#83000393)	212 Benton Ave., W. 41°01′35″N 92°48′22″W	Albia	
10	Saint Patrick's Roman Catholic Church	Saint Patrick's Roman Catholic Church	May 6, 1992 (#92000426)	U.S. Route 34 west of Albia; 41°00′48″N 92°57′20″W	Albia	
11	Arvine and Elizabeth W. White House	Arvine and Elizabeth W. White House	September 8, 1994 (#94001100)	309 N. Main St. 41°01′50″N 92°48′26″W	Albia	

== See also ==
- List of National Historic Landmarks in Iowa
- National Register of Historic Places listings in Iowa
- Listings in neighboring counties: Appanoose, Lucas, Mahaska, Marion, Wapello
