= Monroe County Courthouse =

Monroe County Courthouse may refer to:

- Old Monroe County Courthouse, Monroeville, Alabama
- Monroe County Courthouse (Arkansas)
- Monroe County Courthouse (Georgia)
- Monroe County Courthouse (Iowa)
- Monroe County Courthouse (Indiana)
- Monroe County Courthouse (Michigan), in Monroe County, Michigan
- Monroe County Courthouse (Ohio)
- Monroe County Courthouse (Pennsylvania)
- Monroe County Courthouse (Tennessee)
- Monroe County Courthouse (Wisconsin)

== See also ==
- Monroe County (disambiguation)
