= USS LST-1038 =

World War II tank landing ship

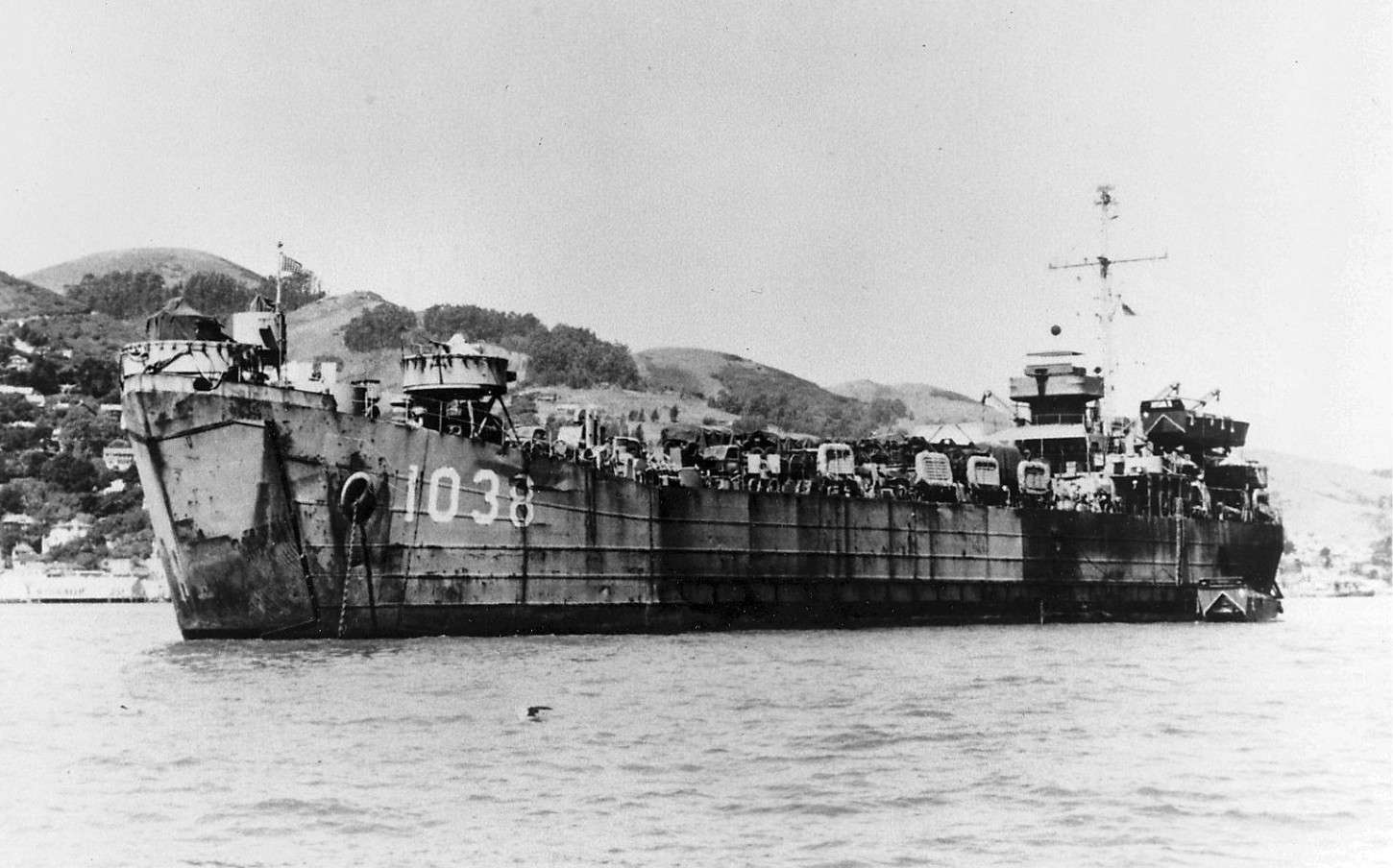
- LST-1038 at anchor in San Francisco Bay

History

United States
- Name: USS LST-1038
- Namesake: Monroe County, Alabama; Monroe County, Arkansas; Monroe County, Florida; Monroe County, Georgia; Monroe County, Illinois; Monroe County, Indiana; Monroe County, Iowa; Monroe County, Kentucky; Monroe County, Michigan; Monroe County, Mississippi; Monroe County, Missouri; Monroe County, New York; Monroe County, Ohio; Monroe County, Pennsylvania; Monroe County, Tennessee; Monroe County, West Virginia; Monroe County, Wisconsin
- Builder: Dravo Corporation, Pittsburgh
- Laid down: 29 October 1944
- Launched: 6 January 1945
- Commissioned: 5 February 1945
- Decommissioned: June 1949
- Renamed: USS Monroe County (LST-1038), 1 July 1955
- Stricken: 1 November 1958
- Honors and awards: 1 battle star (World War II)
- Fate: Unknown

General characteristics
- Class & type: LST-542-class tank landing ship
- Displacement: 1,625 long tons (1,651 t) light; 3,640 long tons (3,698 t) full
- Length: 328 ft (100 m)
- Beam: 50 ft (15 m)
- Draft: Unloaded : 2 ft 4 in (0.71 m) forward; 7 ft 6 in (2.29 m) aft; Loaded : 8 ft 2 in (2.49 m) forward; 14 ft 1 in (4.29 m) aft
- Propulsion: 2 × General Motors 12-567 diesel engines, two shafts, twin rudders
- Speed: 12 knots (22 km/h; 14 mph)
- Boats & landing craft carried: 2 or 6 × LCVPs
- Troops: Approximately 130 officers and enlisted men
- Complement: 8-10 officers, 89-100 enlisted men
- Armament: 8 × 40 mm guns; 12 × 20 mm guns

USS LST-1038 was a LST-542-class tank landing ship built for the United States Navy during World War II. She was later named Monroe County (LST-1038) after counties in seventeen U.S. States – the only U.S. Naval vessel to bear the name – but never saw active service under the latter name.

Originally laid down as USS LST-1038 on 29 October 1944 by the Dravo Corporation of Pittsburgh, Pennsylvania; launched on 6 January 1945, sponsored by Mrs. Elwood Printz; and commissioned at New Orleans on 5 February 1945.

== Service history ==
=== World War II, 1945 ===
Following shakedown exercises along the Florida gulf coast, LST-1038 returned to New Orleans for availability then steamed to Gulfport, Mississippi and Mobile, Alabama, taking on side-carry pontoons at the former and cargo ammunition at the latter. Loaded by 15 March, she departed for the Panama Canal en route to the western Pacific. Steaming independently, she arrived at Ulithi on 4 May, departing again on the 8th with convoy UOL 11, then headed west to the embattled Ryukyus. On 16 May she sighted Kerama Retto and, after reporting to CTG 31.15, commenced supplying ammunition to fleet units as necessary, primarily DDs and DMSs. The constant threat of Japanese air attack kept the crew alert at all times, bringing them to general quarters at least once every day for the next month. On 10 June she shifted her operating area to Nakagusuku Wan, Okinawa where she carried out similar ammunition supply ship missions for CTG 31.19 until the end of the month. She then got underway for Leyte, arriving on 6 July to begin availability.

=== Post-war activities, 1945–1949 ===
Two days after the formal Japanese surrender in Tokyo Bay, on 2 September, LST-1038 cleared Subic Bay en route to Luzon where she took on personnel attached to headquarters, XI Army, for transportation to Wakayama, Honshū for occupation duty. Disembarking her passengers on the 25th, she returned to the Philippines to take on further occupation troops. During the next two months she completed two more troop lifts, one from the Philippines, the other from Okinawa. On 27 December she sailed for Saipan, thence steamed to Tinian where she took on cargo for Guam. Arriving there on 10 January 1946, she sailed again on 2 February heading for the Russells for temporary duty under ComMarianas in connection with rollup of ocean bases in that area.

Detached from the Pacific Fleet in the spring, LST-1088 headed back toward the Panama Canal and duty on the Atlantic coast. In May she reported to the 3rd Naval District and for the next three years served as a training vessel for naval reservists in the New York area.

=== Decommissioning ===
In 1949 she was ordered south for inactivation. Decommissioning in June, she entered the Atlantic Reserve Fleet, berthing at Green Cove Springs, Florida. Renamed USS Monroe County (LST-1038) on 1 July 1955, she remained in Florida until 1958, when she was struck from the Naval Vessel Register on 1 November 1958. Her final fate is unknown.

== Awards ==
LST-1038 received one battle star for her World War II service.
