= Theodore Perry =

American politician

Theodore B. Perry
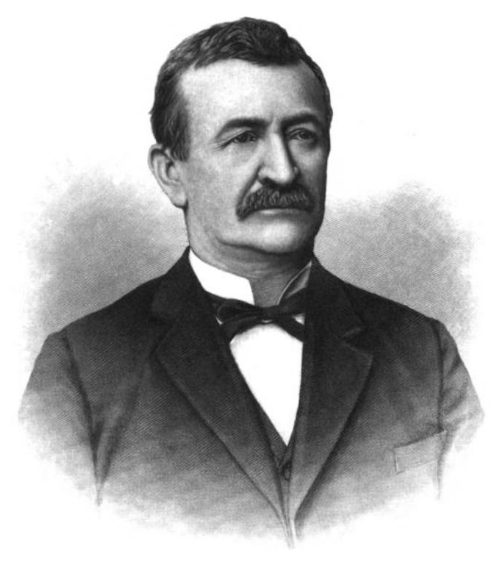

Member of the Iowa Senate from the 15th district
- In office January 11, 1892 – January 12, 1896
- Preceded by: Edward R. Cassatt
- Succeeded by: Samuel Druet

Personal details
- Born: Theodore Bolivar Perry; April 1, 1833 Cincinnati, Ohio, United States
- Died: May 14, 1921 (aged 88) Albia, Iowa
- Party: Democrat

Theodore Bolivar Perry (April 1, 1833 – May 14, 1921) was an American lawyer and politician who served in the Iowa State Senate and as prosecuting attorney of Monroe County, Iowa.

Perry was born in Cincinnati, Ohio and, as an adolescent, moved with his family to Iowa. In early adulthood, he was a schoolteacher and, in 1852 began reading law in Albia, Iowa.

In 1854 Perry was admitted to the Iowa Bar and went into practice with John S. Townsend. Perry became a successful attorney, was elected prosecuting attorney of Monroe County, Iowa, and also developed several commercial properties in Albia. He was elected to the Iowa State Board of Education in 1858, serving for four years. In 1877 he built a large "show residence" in Albia – an elaborate, High Victorian home that has since been listed on the National Register of Historic Places. He was later elected to the Iowa Senate representing the 15th district (then composed of Marion County, Iowa and Monroe County, Iowa).

Nathan E. Kendall read law under Perry and the two remained lifelong friends. He married Minerva Allison in 1854 and, with her, had two children. After his first wife's death, he remarried, to Amanda Craig. With her, he had three children. Among his grandchildren was J. Harvey Littrell.

== See also ==
- T.B. Perry House
