= Earl Evans (American football) =

American football player (1900–1991)

Earl "Buck" Evans
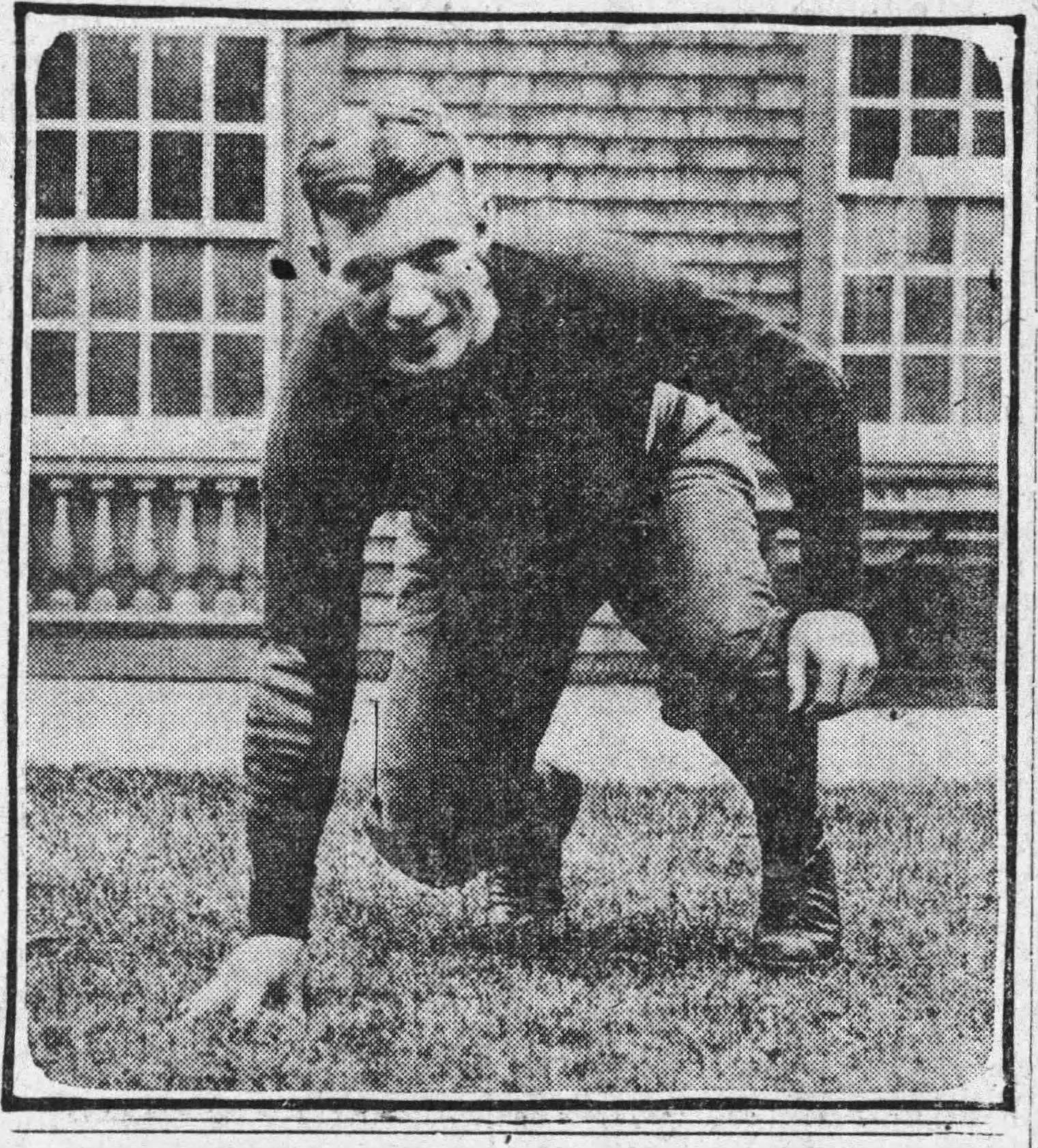
- Evans as a Harvard Crimson player

No. 19
- Position: Offensive lineman

Personal information
- Born: April 14, 1900; Lucas, Iowa, U.S.
- Died: December 5, 1991 (aged 91); Walnut Creek, California, U.S.
- Listed height: 5 ft 11 in (1.80 m)
- Listed weight: 204 lb (93 kg)

Career information
- High school: Albia (IA)
- College: Harvard

Career history
- Chicago Cardinals (1925); Chicago Bears (1926–1929)

Career statistics
- Games played: 55
- Games started: 28
- Fumble recoveries for TDs: 1

Earl "Buck" Evans (April 14, 1900 – December 5, 1991) was an American professional football player who played offensive lineman for five seasons for the Chicago Cardinals and the Chicago Bears.
