= Brick Gothic House =

Historic house in Iowa, United States

- U.S. National Register of Historic Places
- Location within Iowa Location within the United States
- Location: 1.25 miles S of Albia, 0.75 miles E of Iowa Highway 5, and 0.5 miles west of County Road T35
- Coordinates: 40°59′30.5″N 92°48′18″W
- Area: less than one acre
- Built: 1885
- Architectural style: Gothic Revival
- NRHP reference No.: 94000351
- Added to NRHP: April 14, 1994

The Brick Gothic House is a historical residence located south of Albia in rural Monroe County, Iowa, United States. Built in 1885 it is a rare example of a Gothic Revival house located on a farm in southeast Iowa. The 2 story brick house features nine Gothic arch windows on the first floor and three on the second level. A polygonal bay is located on the south elevation. The structure follows a T-plan, with the main entrance in the leg of the "T". A single-story porch is located in an inside corner, also on the south side. The house was listed on the National Register of Historic Places in 1994.
