= Avery, Iowa =

- unincorporated community
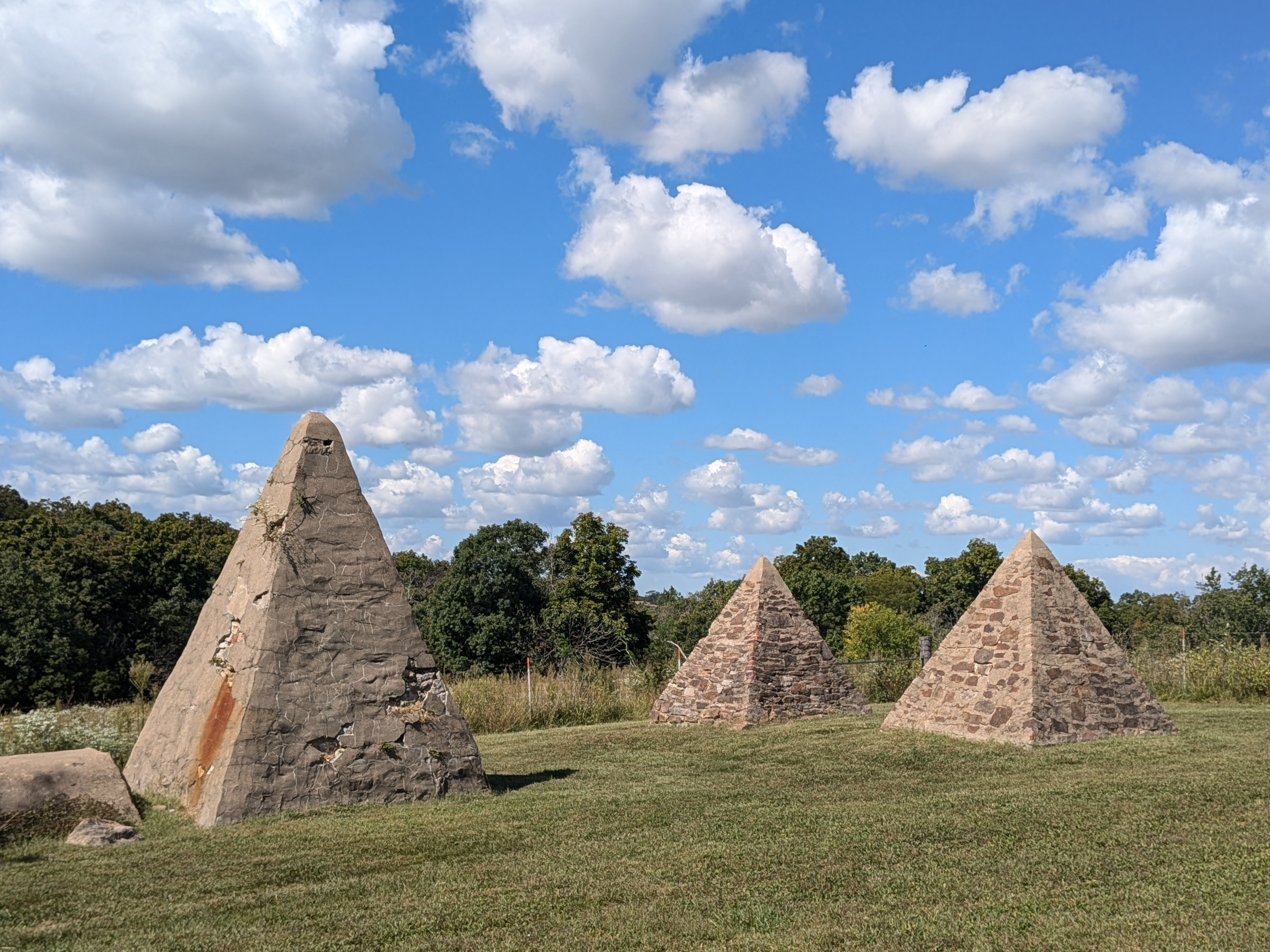
- Pyramids in Hickory Grove Cemetery, near Avery

- Location within Iowa Location within the United States
- Coordinates: 41°03′55″N 92°42′52″W
- Country: USA
- State: Iowa
- County: Monroe County
- Elevation: 276 m (906 ft)
- Time zone: UTC-6 (Central (CST))
  - Summer (DST): UTC-5 (CDT)
- GNIS feature ID: 454289

Avery is an unincorporated community in Monroe County, Iowa, United States.

== Geography ==
The community is located at the intersection of County Road H27 and 700th Avenue, six miles (9.7 km) northeast of Albia, at 41.063413N, -92.716236W.

== History ==
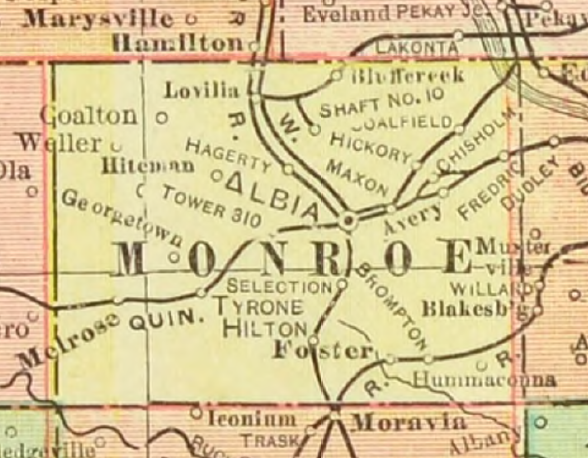
Avery in Monroe County, Iowa, in 1902

Avery was founded in 1868 when the Chicago, Burlington and Quincy Railroad was constructed through the area. It was originally named Coffman, after the owner of the townsite. The name was later changed to Avery, after nearby Avery Creek.

Avery's population was 300 in 1940.
