= Monroe Township, Monroe County, Iowa =

Township in Iowa, USA

Coordinates: 40°57′N 92°49′W

Monroe Township is a township in Monroe County, Iowa, USA.
