= Bluff Creek Township, Monroe County, Iowa =

Township in Monroe County, Iowa, U.S.

Coordinates: 41.1161°N 92.8106°W

Bluff Creek is a township in Monroe County, Iowa, United States.
