= Dr. George A. Jenkins House =

Historic house in Iowa, United States

- U.S. National Register of Historic Places
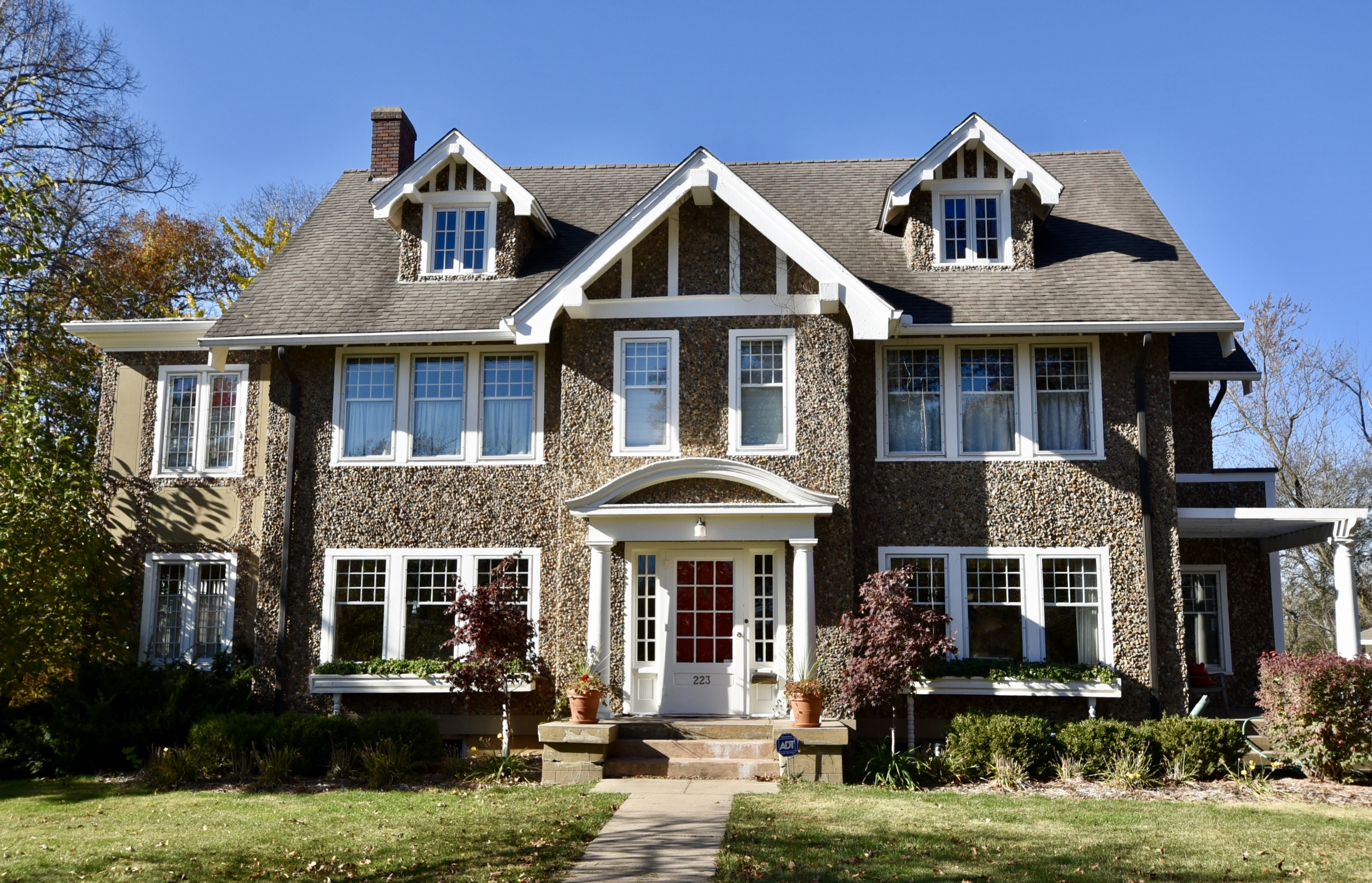

- Location within Iowa Location within the United States
- Location: 223 S. C St., Albia, Iowa
- Coordinates: 41°01′27.5″N 92°48′44.5″W
- Area: less than one acre
- Built: 1926
- Built by: John Jones
- Architectural style: Tudor Revival
- NRHP reference No.: 87000027
- Added to NRHP: February 5, 1987

The Dr. George A. Jenkins House is a historic house located at 223 South C Street in Albia, Iowa.

== Description and history ==
Built in 1926, it is the largest Tudor Revival house in the city. The 2½-story, wood-framed house features a symmetrical facade, and half-timbering that is associated with the style. It is capped with a steeply pitched gable roof and gable dormers. It has an unusual exterior cladding of concrete with river gravel cobblestone set in the wet concrete during construction. The hen's egg sized stones are more than likely from the Des Moines River near Eddyville, Iowa, as they are consistent with other rocks available from that location.

The house was listed on the National Register of Historic Places on February 5, 1987.
