= Cedar Township, Monroe County, Iowa =

Township in Iowa, USA

Coordinates: 41°07′N 93°03′W

Cedar Township is a township in Monroe County, Iowa, United States.
