= Albia Community School District =

Public school district in Albia, Iowa, United States

Coordinates: 41.029555°N 92.802582°W

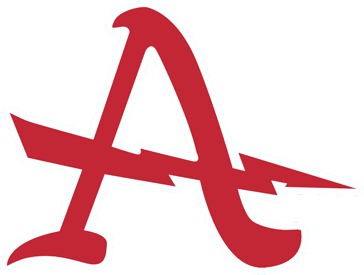

Location
- Albia, Iowa Monroe and Appanoose counties United States
- Coordinates: 41.029555, -92.802582

District information
- Type: Local school district
- Grades: K-12
- Superintendent: Richard Montgomery
- Schools: 5
- Budget: $16,221,000 (2020-21)
- NCES District ID: 1903270

Students and staff
- Students: 1120 (2022-23)
- Teachers: 79.88 FTE
- Staff: 77.29 FTE
- Student–teacher ratio: 14.02
- Athletic conference: South Central

Other information
- Website: albiacsd.org

The Albia Community School District is a rural public school district headquartered in Albia, Iowa.

It serves areas in Monroe and Appanoose counties, including Albia, Lovilia, and Melrose.

It operates Kendall Center, Grant Center, Lincoln Center, Albia Middle School and Albia High School, all located in Ablia.

After the 2008 dissolution of the Russell Community School District, the district absorbed some of the former students of the Russell district.

== Schools ==
The district operates five schools, all located in Albia.

- Grant Center (K-2nd Grade)
- Kendall Center (PK)
- Lincoln Center (3-6 Grade)
- Albia Middle School
- Albia High School

== See also ==
- List of high schools in Iowa
