= Troy Township, Monroe County, Iowa =

Township in Iowa, USA

Coordinates: 41°02′N 92°49′W

Troy Township
- Township
- Interactive map of Troy Township
- Country: United States
- State: Iowa
- County: Monroe

Troy Township is a township in Monroe County, Iowa, USA.
