= T.B. Perry House =

Historic house in Iowa, United States

- U.S. National Register of Historic Places
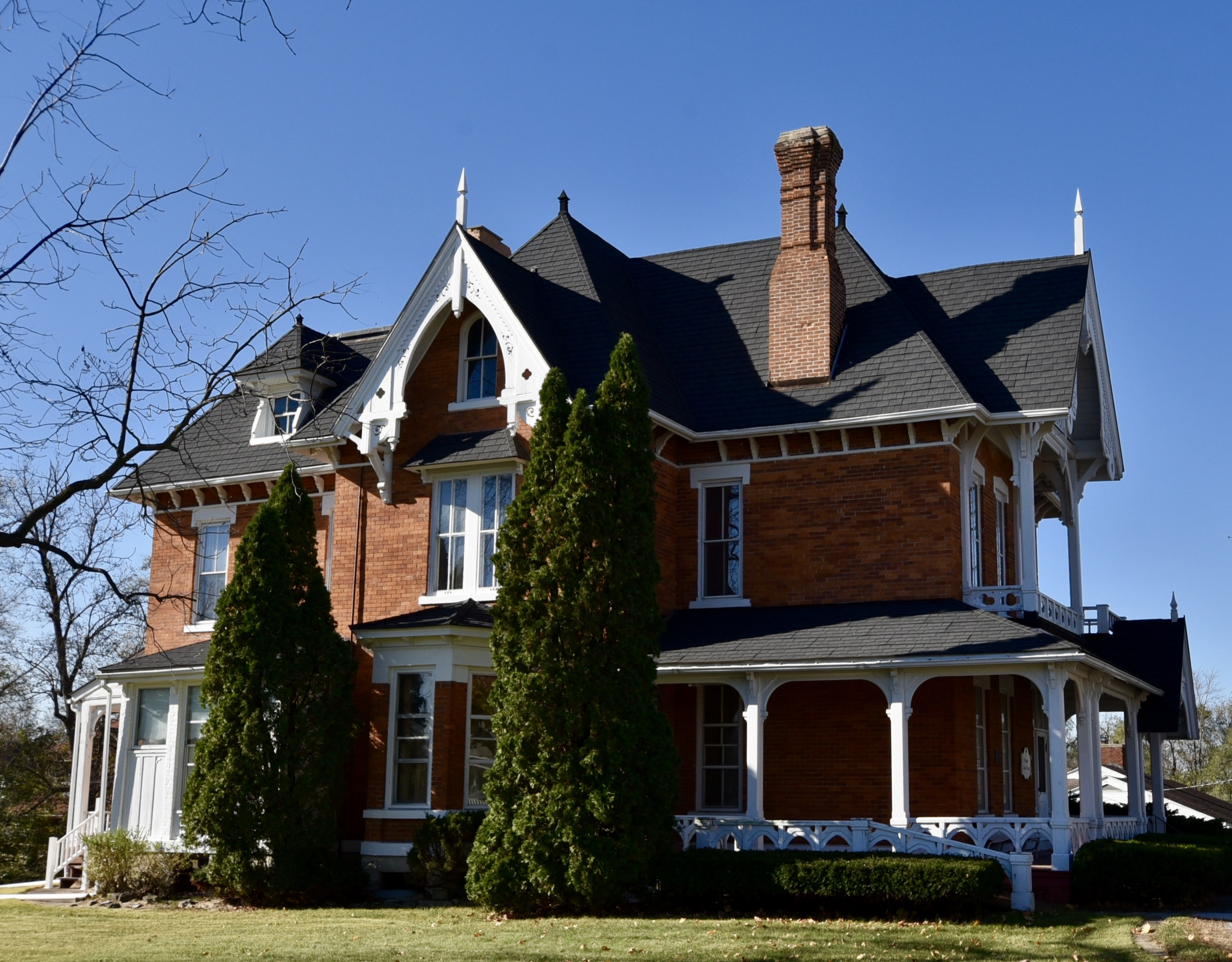

- Location within Iowa Location within the United States
- Location: 212 Benton Ave., W. Albia, Iowa
- Coordinates: 41°01′37″N 92°48′41″W
- Area: less than one acre
- Built: 1877-1878
- Built by: William Phinny
- Architect: Dunham & Jordan
- Architectural style: High Victorian
- NRHP reference No.: 83000393
- Added to NRHP: July 14, 1983

The T.B. Perry House is a historical residence located in Albia, Iowa, United States. Theodore Perry was a local attorney and businessman who served two terms in the Iowa Senate. He is also responsible for a couple of buildings in the Albia Square and Central Commercial Historic District. This house is a High Victorian eclectic style structure. It is one of four large brick houses in Albia known as the Four Sisters. They all feature a running brick bond on their exterior walls. It is an unusual architectural feature for southern Iowa in the period they were built, and it also suggests they have the same architect and/or brick mason. The Elbert-Bates House is another house in this group. The Perry house was designed by Charles A. Dunham from the prominent Burlington, Iowa architectural firm of Dunham & Jordan. It is noteworthy for its elaborate roofing system. It features five dormer windows, two hip-and-deck roofs, three gable roofs, and two hipped roofs. The steeply pitched roof also has finials, pendants, and brackets with a modified frieze under the eaves. Other elements of the richly ornamented exterior include barge boards on the second story and entry gables, and a front porch with Gothic tracery millwork. The house was listed on the National Register of Historic Places in 1983.
