= Albia Square and Central Commercial Historic District =

Historic district in Iowa, United States

- U.S. National Register of Historic Places
- U.S. Historic district
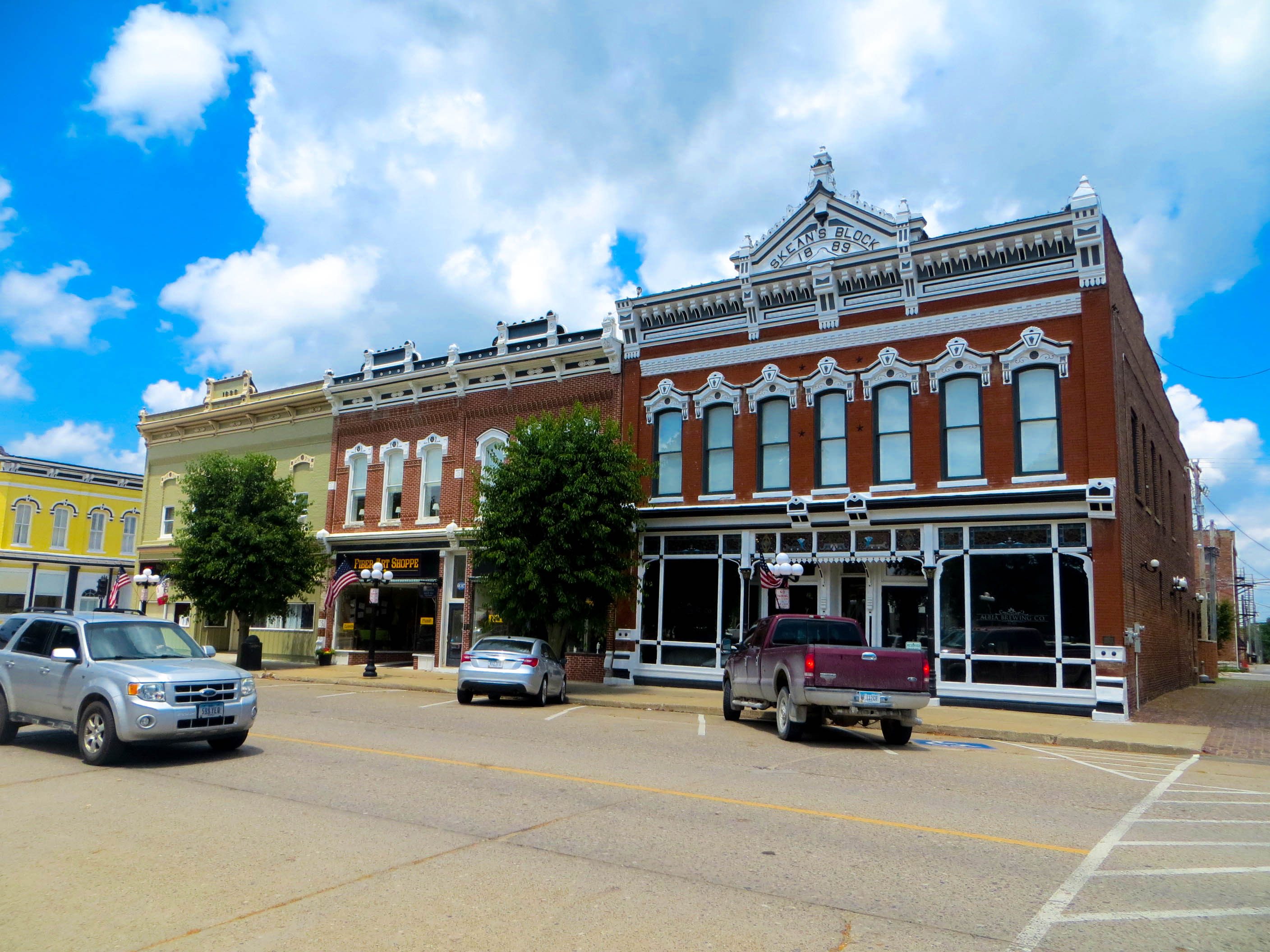

- Location within Iowa Location within the United States
- Location: Roughly bounded by the alley of S. and N. Clinton, E. and W. A Ave., N. and S. 2nd St., and E. and W. 2nd Ave., Albia, Iowa
- Coordinates: 41°01′36″N 92°48′26″W
- Architectural style: Italianate; Queen Anne
- NRHP reference No.: 85000007
- Added to NRHP: January 3, 1985

The Albia Square and Central Commercial Historic District encompasses most of the central business district of Albia, Iowa, United States. It was listed on the National Register of Historic Places (NRHP) in 1985. At the time of its nomination the district consisted of 92 resources, including 65 contributing buildings and 27 non-contributing buildings.

== History ==
Three locating commissioners chose the town site for Albia in 1845 for the county seat for Kishkekosh County, later renamed Monroe County. The town, originally called Princeton, was platted the same year. It included a central public square and streets that were laid out in a gridiron pattern following the points on a compass. Albia continues to follow this plan to the present. The 1858 brick county courthouse was built on the square and the early buildings surrounding the square were largely frame structures with "boom town" facades. Most were one- or two-story structures. The railroad arrived in Albia 1866 and Clinton Street connected the depot with the square. Three brick buildings from 1868 and the 1870s remain on the square and they are the oldest structures in the district. The last frame building on the square was destroyed in a fire in 1902.

Albia experienced an economic boom between 1900 and 1920 when Consolidation Coal Company relocated their operations to Buxton. They joined other coal mines that were already operating in Monroe County. During this time period the county led all Iowa counties in coal production. It peaked during World War I and then declined. Many of the contributing properties are commercial buildings built during the coal era in the late 19th and early 20th centuries. They are primarily two-story brick structures that follow the architectural styles that were prominent when they were built. The Monroe County Courthouse (1903) replaced the brick courthouse on the square, and it is individually listed on the NRHP.

A newspaper story that called Albia the ugliest town in Iowa was the catalyst that First Iowa State Bank Board Chairman Robert T. Bates needed to organize in 1965 what became "Operation Facelift." Bates was a renowned interior designer who had worked in Hollywood before returning to Albia in the 1950s. Volunteers solicited a $25 contribution from building and business owners to the Albia Area Improvement Association fund as seed money for the project. Bates himself established a $2,000,000 trust for revitalization efforts in later years.
