= Monroe County =

Monroe County may refer to seventeen counties in the United States, all named for James Monroe:

- Monroe County, Alabama
- Monroe County, Arkansas
- Monroe County, Florida
- Monroe County, Georgia
- Monroe County, Illinois
- Monroe County, Indiana
- Monroe County, Iowa
- Monroe County, Kentucky
- Monroe County, Michigan
- Monroe County, Mississippi
- Monroe County, Missouri
- Monroe County, New York
- Monroe County, Ohio
- Monroe County, Pennsylvania
- Monroe County, Tennessee
- Monroe County, West Virginia, originally Monroe County, Virginia (1799–1863)
- Monroe County, Wisconsin

== See also ==
- Monroe County Courthouse (disambiguation)
