= Pleasant Township, Monroe County, Iowa =

Township in Iowa, USA

Coordinates: 41°07′N 92°42′W

Pleasant Township is a township in Monroe County, Iowa, USA.
