= Urbana Township, Monroe County, Iowa =

Township in Monroe County, Iowa, U.S.

Coordinates: 40.9494°N 92.6736°W

Urbana Township is a township in Monroe County, Iowa, USA.

== History ==
Urbana Township was first settled in 1844.
