= Tyrone, Iowa =

- Unincorporated community
- Location within Iowa Location within the United States
- Coordinates: 40°58′40″N 92°56′48″W
- Country: United States
- State: Iowa
- County: Monroe
- Elevation: 850 ft (259 m)
- Time zone: UTC-6 (Central (CST))
  - Summer (DST): UTC-5 (CDT)
- Area code: 641
- GNIS feature ID: 462410

Tyrone is an unincorporated community in Monroe County, Iowa, United States. Tyrone is 8.1 miles (13.0 km) west-southwest of Albia.

== History ==
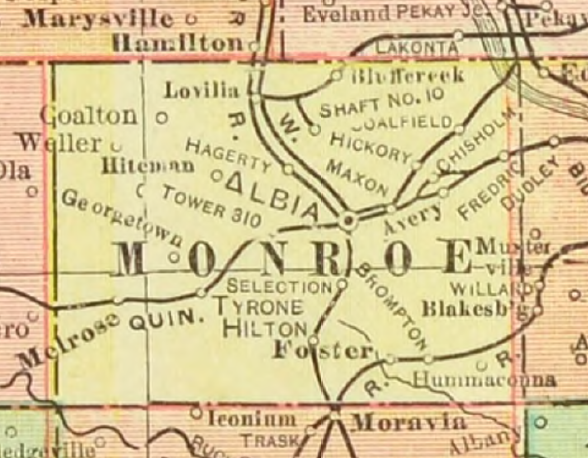
Tyrone in Monroe County, Iowa, in 1902

Tyrone's population was 54 in 1902, and 52 in 1925.

The population was 35 in 1940.
