= Wayne Township, Monroe County, Iowa =

Township in Iowa, USA

Coordinates: 41°02′N 93°03′W

Wayne Township is a township in Monroe County, Iowa, USA.
