= Albia High School =

Public secondary school in Albia, Iowa, United States

Albia Community High School

Location
- 503 B Ave East; Albia, IA; 52531; United States
- 41.027151°N 92.806881°W

Information
- Type: Public
- Motto: It's the process not the product.
- School district: Albia Community School District
- Superintendent: Kevin Crall
- Principal: Richard Montgomery
- Faculty: 26.21 (FTE)
- Grades: 9-12
- Enrollment: 374 (2022-23)
- Student to teacher ratio: 14.27
- Campus size: Small
- Campus type: Town: Remote
- Colors: Royal Blue, Red, and White
- Athletics conference: South Central
- Mascot: Blue Demon
- Website: 712.albiacsd.org

Albia Community High School is a public high school in Albia, Iowa, United States. It is the only high school in the Albia Community School District. The mascots are the Blue Demons and Lady Dees.

== Athletics ==
The Blue Demons and Lady Dees are members of the South Central Conference, and participate in the following sports:

- Football
- Cross Country
- Volleyball
- Basketball
- Wrestling
- Golf
- Soccer
- Tennis
- Track and Field
- Baseball
- Softball
