= Franklin Township, Monroe County, Iowa =

Township in Iowa, USA

Coordinates: 40°57′N 92°56′W

Franklin Township is a township in Monroe County, Iowa, USA. As of March 2021, it has a population of 125 (all rural).
