= Elbert-Bates House =

Historic house in Iowa, United States

- U.S. National Register of Historic Places
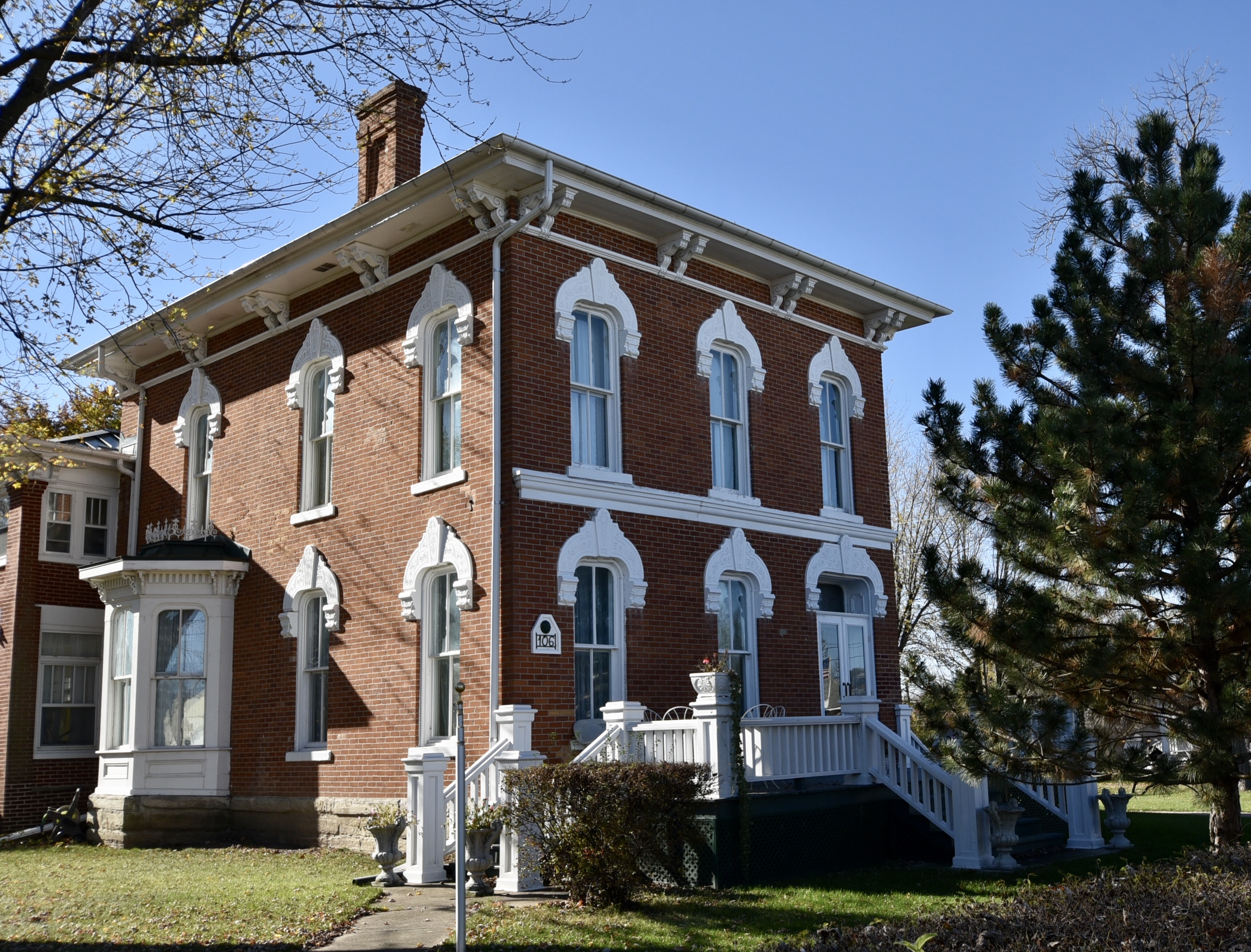

- Location within Iowa Location within the United States
- Location: 106 2nd Ave., W. Albia, Iowa
- Coordinates: 41°01′30″N 92°48′36″W
- Area: less than one acre
- Built: 1873-1875; 1917-1918
- Architectural style: Italianate
- NRHP reference No.: 85001379
- Added to NRHP: June 27, 1985

The Elbert-Bates House is a historical residence located in Albia, Iowa, United States. The house is named for two of its earlier owners. Benjamin F. Elbert was a cashier and member of the board of directors of the First National Bank of Albia, as well as a cattle farmer. He relocated to Des Moines, where he was a successful businessman. David W. Bates was a local attorney and banker. He served as the Iowa State Superintendent of Banking during the Great Depression. Elbert had the original house built from 1873 to 1875. Bates had the two-story Prairie Style-influenced solarium built onto the rear of the house from 1917 to 1918. The house originally had a wooden porch on the front, but, because of extensive wood rot, it was removed at the same time the solarium was added.

The house is a vernacular form of the Italianate style. It is one of four large brick houses in Albia known as the Four Sisters. They all feature a running brick bonding on their exterior walls. It is an unusual architectural feature for southern Iowa in the period they were built, and it also suggests they have the same architect and/or brick mason. The T.B. Perry House, one of the other houses in this group, was designed by Burlington, Iowa architect Charles A. Dunham. He was also responsible for the Vermilion Estate in adjacent Appanoose County, which is similar in style to the original block of this house. It is possible he is the architect for all of these houses. The Elbert-Bates house was listed on the National Register of Historic Places in 1985.
