= Arvine and Elizabeth W. White House =

Historic house in Iowa, United States

- U.S. National Register of Historic Places
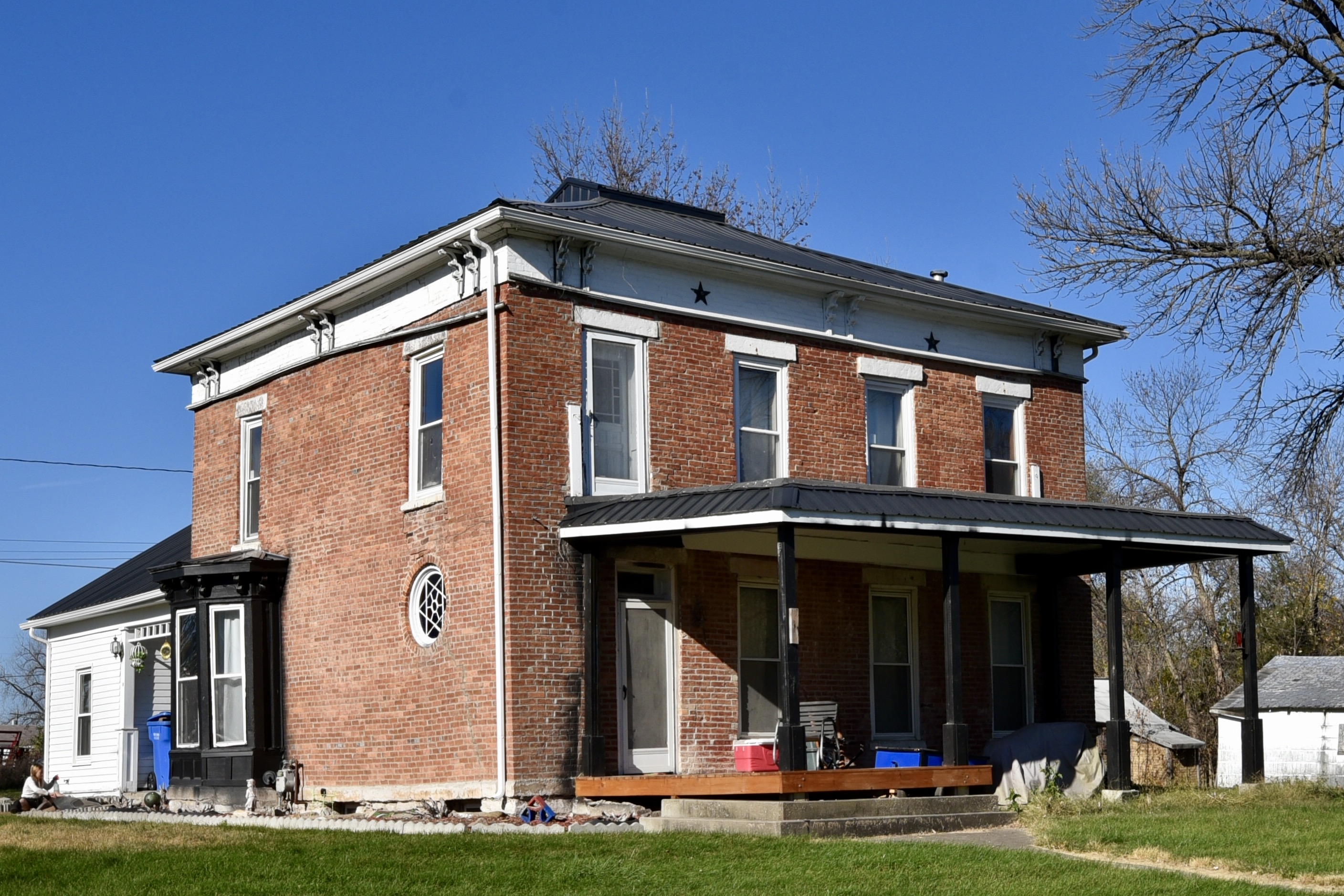

- Location within Iowa Location within the United States
- Location: 309 N. Main St. Albia, Iowa
- Coordinates: 41°01′50″N 92°48′26″W
- Area: less than one acre
- Built by: Arvine W. White
- Architectural style: Vernacular
- NRHP reference No.: 94001100
- Added to NRHP: September 8, 1994

The Arvine and Elizabeth W. White House is a historical residence located in Albia, Iowa, United States. It is the only brick house in town that remains from before the American Civil War. The vernacular-style house has an Adamesque character about it, and it is reminiscent of the style popularized in by Charles Bulfinch and advocated by Asher Benjamin as late as the 1840s. Because White was originally from the Western Reserve of Ohio he was no doubt familiar with the style as it was popular there. The two-story brick house rests on a foundation of native limestone, and it is capped with a hipped roof. It is four bays across the front with the main entrance in the first bay from the left. The house also features a cornice, bracketed eaves, and a 1½-story wing attached to the rear of the main block. It was listed on the National Register of Historic Places in 1994.
