= Mantua Township, Monroe County, Iowa =

Township in Monroe County, Iowa, U.S.

Coordinates: 41.0308°N 92.6972°W

Mantua Township is a township in Monroe County, Iowa, United States.

== History ==
Mantua Township was organized in 1845.
