= Noble-Kendall House =

Historic house in Iowa, United States

- U.S. National Register of Historic Places
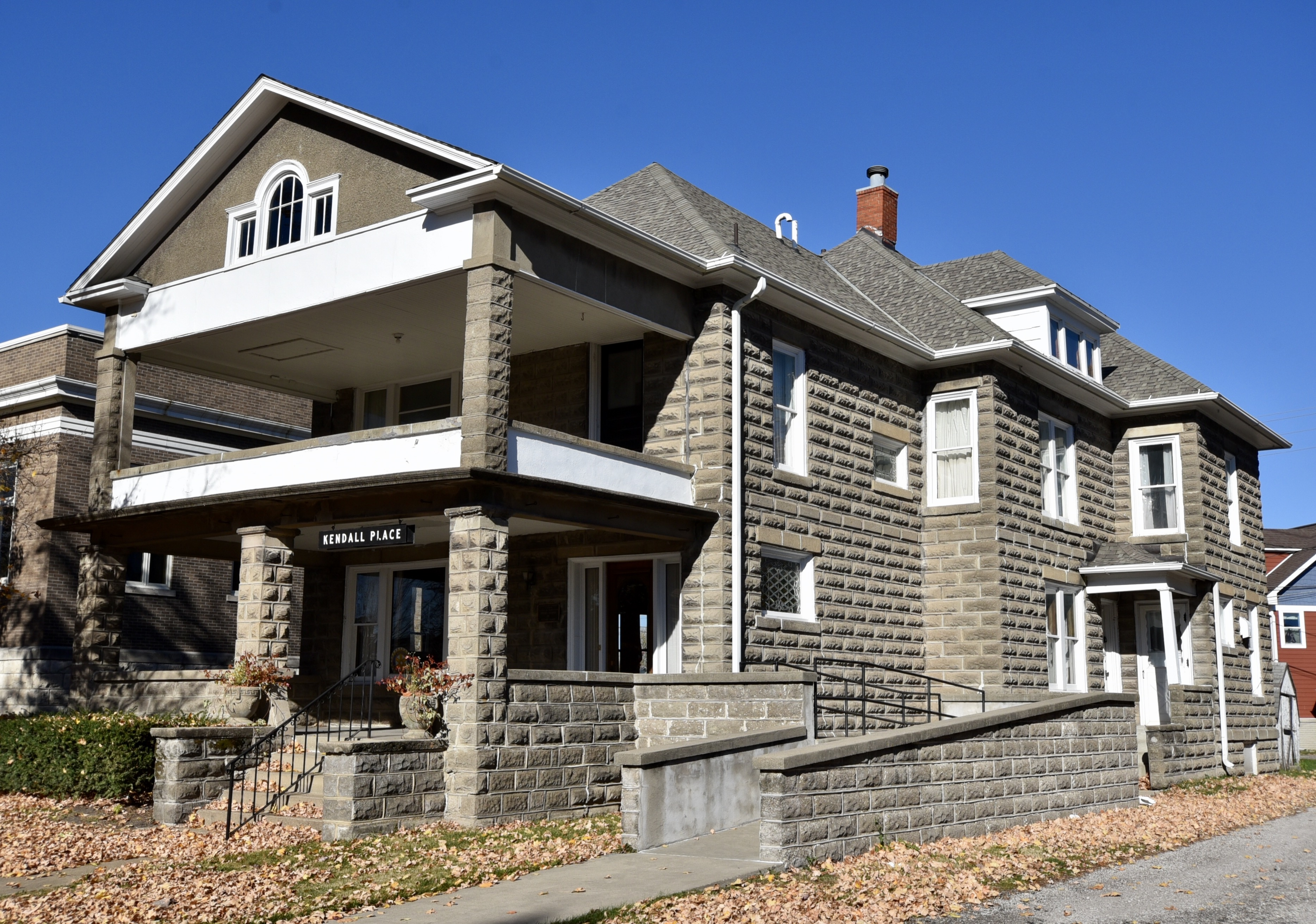

- Location within Iowa Location within the United States
- Location: 209 E. Benton Ave. Albia, Iowa
- Coordinates: 41°01′39″N 92°48′19″W
- Area: less than one acre
- Built: 1907
- Built by: A.E. Noble
- Architectural style: Classical Revival
- NRHP reference No.: 84001289
- Added to NRHP: July 14, 1983

The Noble-Kendall House, also known as Kendall Place, is a historical residence located in Albia, Iowa, United States. Alvis E. Noble was a local businessman and contractor who operated a concrete block factory. He and his wife Cordelia had this house built after their previous house was destroyed in a fire. Completed in 1907, it was built with concrete block, which was an unusual building material for residential construction at the time.

This Neoclassical-style house is also associated with Nathan E. Kendall. He was a local attorney who became a politician. A Republican, he was elected to the Iowa House of Representatives in 1899, and served as Speaker of the House during the 32nd and 32nd extra sessions. From 1909 to 1913 he served the United States House of Representatives representing Iowa's 6th congressional district. Due to health concerns, he pulled out of the 1912 race and returned to Albia to practice law. He and his wife Belle bought his house in 1916. Kendall was then elected the 23rd governor of Iowa in 1920, and served two terms. Ill health plagued his second term. The Kendalls remained in Des Moines after he was governor, eventually living in the home he bought from his colleague Senator Albert B. Cummins. The Kendalls donated their house in Albia to the Albia Woman's Club. From that time it has been known as "Kendall Place", and it has been used as a club house and community meeting center. Nathan Kendall had his cremated remains buried on the lawn of Kendall Place in 1936. The house was listed on the National Register of Historic Places in 1983.
