= Jackson Township, Monroe County, Iowa =

Township in Iowa, USA

Coordinates: 40°57′N 93°03′W

Jackson Township is a township in Monroe County, Iowa, USA.
