= Monroe County Courthouse (Tennessee) =

- U.S. National Register of Historic Places
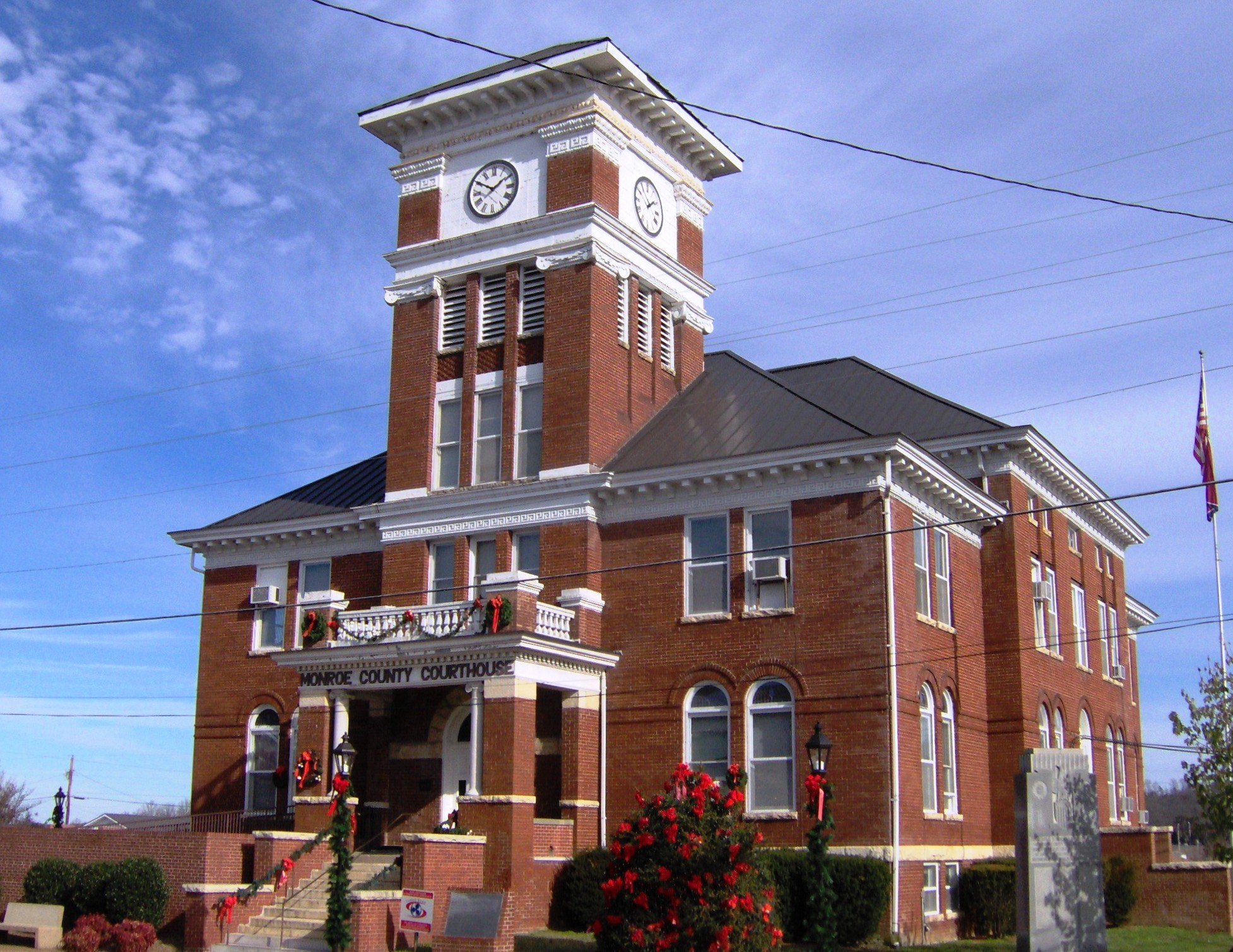

- Location within Tennessee Location within the United States
- Interactive map showing the location of Monroe County Courthouse
- Location: Town Sq., Madisonville, Tennessee
- Coordinates: 35°31′11″N 84°21′46″W
- Area: less than one acre
- Built: 1897; 129 years ago
- Built by: Gaylon Seldon Co.
- Architect: Bauman Brothers and Co.
- Architectural style: Classical Revival, Italianate, Romanesque
- MPS: Historic County Courthouses of Tennessee MPS
- NRHP reference No.: 95000341
- Added to NRHP: March 30, 1995

The Monroe County Courthouse in Madisonville, Tennessee was built in 1897. It was listed on the National Register of Historic Places in 1995.

It is a red brick building with white trim and a hipped roof.

It was designed by architect Bauman Brothers and Co.; the building contractor was Gaylon Seldon Co.

The listing included a contributing object, a World War I memorial.
