= Buxton Historic Townsite =

- U.S. National Register of Historic Places
- Location within Iowa Location within the United States
- Nearest city: Lovilia, Iowa
- Coordinates: 41°09′30″N 92°49′16″W
- NRHP reference No.: 83000392
- Added to NRHP: August 9, 1983

The Buxton Historic Townsite is a historical site located east of Lovilia, Iowa, United States in rural Monroe County. The unincorporated community was founded in 1895, developed by the Chicago and Northwestern Railway as a coal mining company town to supply the railroad. It was a racially integrated community, in 1905 consisting of European immigrants and a majority-African American population, that was developed in the midst of southern Iowa coalfields.

With changes in the industry and conversion of locomotives to electric or diesel operations in the early 20th century, mining declined here. A large fire in 1916 added to the exodus of population as well. By 1927 the community had lost all of its residents. The town site was listed on the National Register of Historic Places in 1983.

== History ==
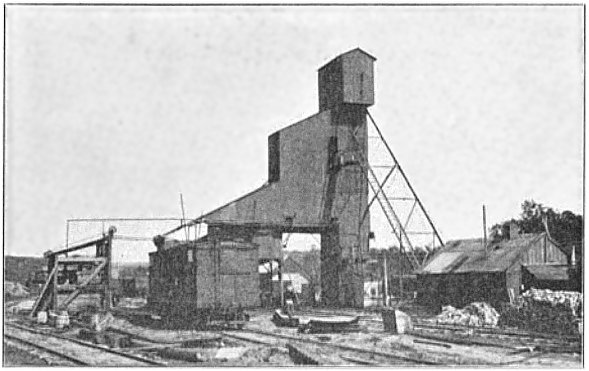
Consolidation Mine No. 10, c. 1908.

J.E. Buxton came to Iowa in the mid-1880s as an agent for the Consolidation Coal Company. Consolidation was a division of the Chicago and Northwestern Railway, and it mined coal in Iowa to fuel the company's trains. His son Ben succeeded him, and he was faced with a lack of workers, strikes, and the increased demand for workers from his competitors. The company sent H.A. Armstrong to the Southern United States to recruit African-American workers and white workers from nearby coal mines as strike breakers and cheap labor.

As the mines in Muchakinock in adjacent Mahaska County started to decline, the railroad extended its line to Monroe County. Ben Buxton, who became president of Consolidation Coal, founded his namesake town in 1895. All the coal mined there was bought by the railroad, which resulted in steady work for the miners and relatively high wages.

Ackers Coal Company and the Regal Coal Company opened mines near Buxton in the early 20th century. By that time Buxton grew to be the largest coal town west of the Mississippi River, and the largest unincorporated community in the United States. In 1905 there were 2,700 blacks and 1,991 whites. The European Americans included numerous immigrants, who came from Belgium, Bohemia, France, Germany, Norway, Russia, Sweden, and Wales. Even though Buxton had a mix of races and ethnic groups, there was no overt segregation and little racial or ethnic discrimination.

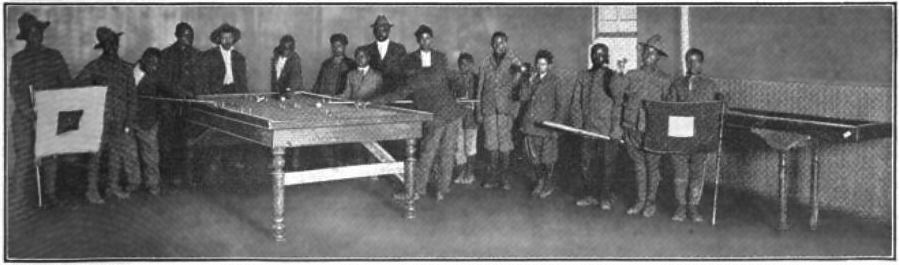
Buxton YMCA c. 1915.

Buxton was a company town. Consolidation Coal's headquarters were located there. They built houses, schools, parks, a YMCA, and other establishments. The company's security guards acted as a police force. A department store, the Monroe Mercantile Company, was established in 1901. It employed 100 people until it burned down in 1911. The department store opened the same year as the post office. The town also had its own baseball team, known as the Buxton Wonders.

The residents developed a strong community, and African Americans made good lives for their families. It was a place served by African-American doctors and lawyers, as well as teachers. Several African-American citizens from Buxton rose to state and national prominence. E.A. Carter was the first black graduate from the University of Iowa College of Medicine. He returned to Buxton in 1907 to become assistant chief surgeon for Consolidation Coal; he was promoted to chief surgeon in 1915.

Attorney George H. Woodson co-founded the Niagara Movement in 1905. It became the National Association for the Advancement of Colored People in 1909. Woodson and fellow Buxton attorney Samuel Joe Brown later were co-founders, along with three other attorneys, of the National Bar Association in 1925, a black professional association.

Coal production reached its peak in 1914. African Americans had started to leave the town in 1911, and by 1915 European Americans were in the majority. More residents left after large fires destroyed parts of the town in 1916. By 1919 only about 400 people remained in Buxton. Most of the nearby mines were closed in the early 1920s because of decreased demand for coal to power locomotives.

In 1923, Consolidation's headquarters were moved to Haydock in western Monroe County. The same year the Buxton post office closed. The company dissolved in 1925 and sold all its stock to Superior Coal Company of Gillespie, Illinois. Buxton mine No. 18 was closed in 1927, and the rest of the town was vacated. The last mine in the Buxton area was closed in 1932. The Chicago and Northwestern Railway ceased operations in the area in 1935, and the tracks were removed the following year. Subsequently, most of the remaining buildings in the town were torn down, and much of the land is either forested or farmed. A few structures from the town remain as ruins.

== Representation in other media ==
- Searching for Buxton (2011), documentary produced by Iowa Public TV, narrated by Simon Estes (full program online)
