= J. Harvey Littrell =

American pedagogist and genealogist

John Harvey Littrell
- Born: June 12, 1912; Waterloo, Iowa, United States
- Died: March 13, 2001 (aged 88)
- Occupation: pedagogist

J. Harvey Littrell (June 4, 1912 - March 13, 2001) was an American pedagogist and genealogist.

Littrell was born in Waterloo, Iowa to Frank N. Littrell and his wife, Flora May Ault. He earned a bachelor's degree from Iowa State Teachers College in 1935 and a master's degree from the Iowa State University four years later. In 1950 he received a doctorate from the University of Missouri.

Early in his career, Littrell taught in the public schools of Nebraska and Missouri. In 1954 he joined the faculty of the School of Education at Kansas State University, remaining there until his retirement in 1982. During this time he also served as a visiting professor at the University of Missouri, Montana State University, and the University of Guam. Littrell's work in the area of secondary school curriculum development earned him repeated recognition from the Association for Supervision and Curriculum Development, including its Leader in Education award in 1974, and its Outstanding Educator of America award in 1975.

Littrell was also noted for the numerous genealogical texts he authored or edited. Under his editorship, Kansas Kin was recognized as "Outstanding Publication" by the Kentucky Genealogical Association.

Littrell married Louise Miller on August 1, 1940 and, with her, had four sons, including Kansas State University music professor David Littrell.
