= Monroe County Courthouse (Iowa) =

- U.S. National Register of Historic Places
- U.S. Historic district – Contributing property
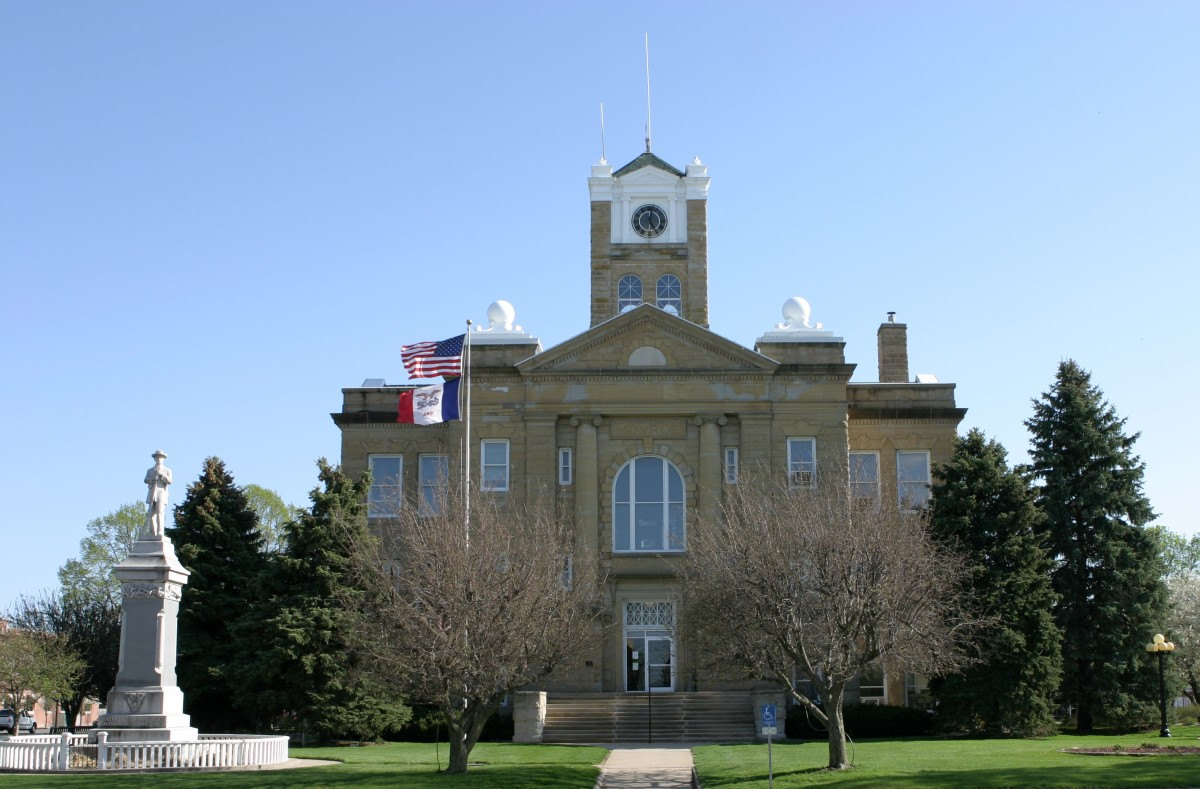

- Location within Iowa Location within the United States
- Interactive map showing the location of Monroe County Courthouse
- Location: Main St. Albia, Iowa
- Coordinates: 41°01′35.8″N 92°48′27.6″W
- Area: less than one acre
- Built: 1903; 123 years ago
- Built by: James Rowson & Sons
- Architect: O.O. Smith
- Architectural style: Romanesque
- Part of: Albia Square and Central Commercial Historic District (ID85000007)
- MPS: County Courthouses in Iowa TR
- NRHP reference No.: 81000258
- Added to NRHP: July 2, 1981

The Monroe County Courthouse in Albia, Iowa, United States, was built in 1903. It was listed on the National Register of Historic Places in 1981 as a part of the County Courthouses in Iowa Thematic Resource. In 1985 it was listed as a contributing property in the Albia Square and Central Commercial Historic District. The courthouse is the third building the county has used for court functions and county administration.

== History ==
Monroe County was originally called Kishkekosh County, and its first courthouse was a log structure built in 1846. It featured a half-story sized room above the courtroom for jury deliberations. It was torn down in 1860 and replaced by a Tudor Revival-style building in the town park. The new building was ordered by Judge James Hilt, who ran the county from 1851 to 1861. There was considerable opposition to the new courthouse, and a local newspaper said that Judge Hilton chose the worse of the two proposed designs for the building. The cornerstone for the present courthouse was laid on August 29, 1902. It was designed by Des Moines architect O.O. Smith, and constructed by James Rowson & Sons for around $100,000.

== Architecture ==
The exterior of the three-story structure is composed of buff-colored sandstone. Its architectural style is primarily derived from the Neoclassical, but the heavy rock-faced exterior is from the Richardsonian Romanesque style. All four elevations feature slightly projecting center pavilions that rise to a pediment above the roofline. On the north and south elevations, the pavilions are flanked by square towers that terminate with a decorative cap. A projecting cornice runs below the roofline. Above the main entrance is a large round-arch window flanked by Ionic columns. A square stone tower with clock and four small parapets rises from the center of the building. Its original spire has been removed. The significance of the courthouse is derived from its association with county government, and the political power and prestige of Albia as the county seat.
