= Lovilia, Iowa =

- City
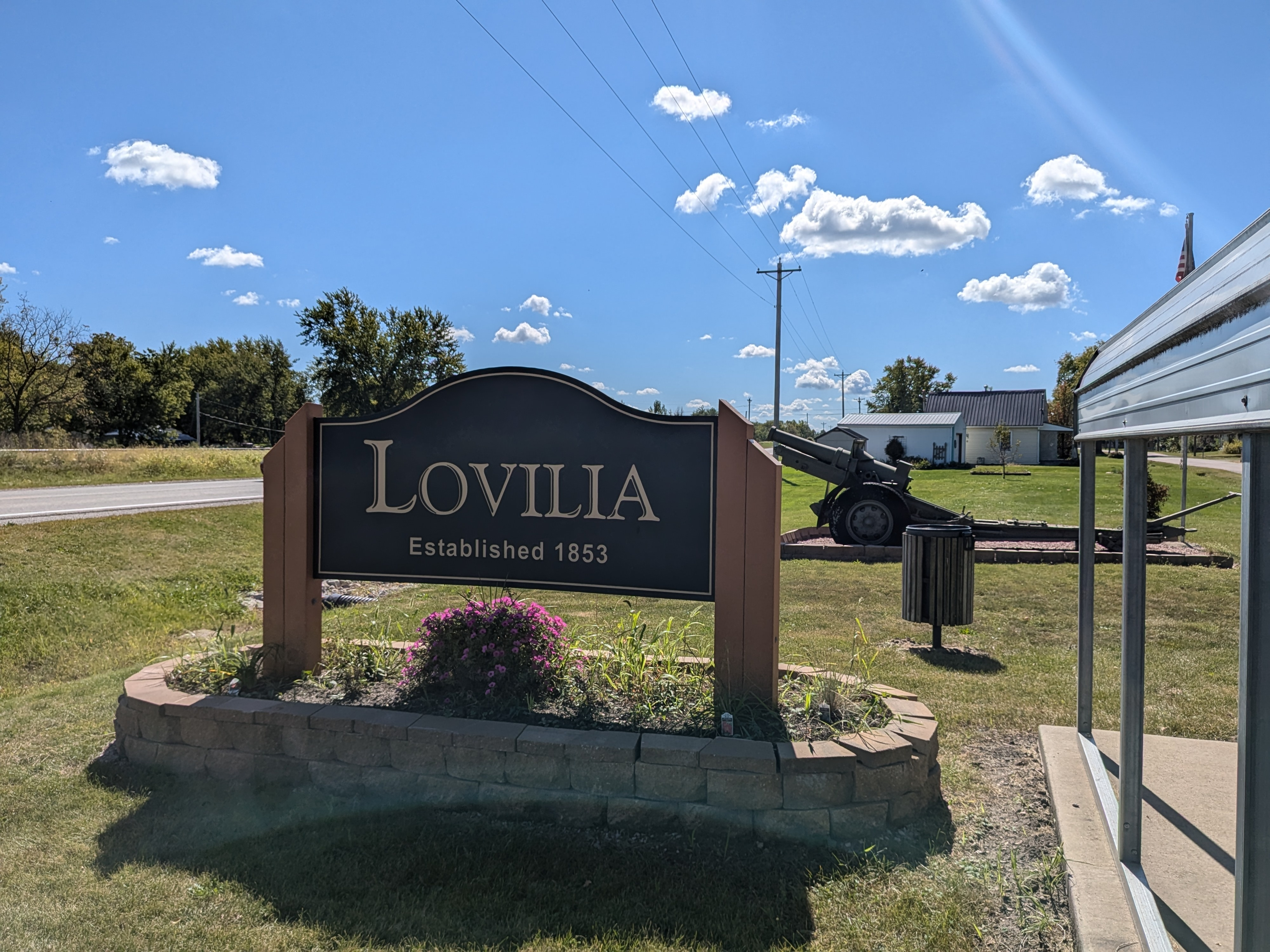
- Lovilia welcome sign and cannon

- Location of Lovilia, Iowa
- Coordinates: 41°08′05″N 92°54′28″W
- Country: USA
- State: Iowa
- County: Monroe

Area
  - Total: 0.52 sq mi (1.35 km^{2})
  - Land: 0.52 sq mi (1.35 km^{2})
  - Water: 0 sq mi (0.00 km^{2})
- Elevation: 935 ft (285 m)

Population (2020)
  - Total: 472
  - Density: 904.6/sq mi (349.25/km^{2})
- Time zone: UTC-6 (Central (CST))
  - Summer (DST): UTC-5 (CDT)
- ZIP code: 50150
- Area code: 641
- FIPS code: 19-46830
- GNIS feature ID: 2395775

Lovilia is a city in Monroe County, Iowa, United States. The population was 472 at the time of the 2020 census.

== History ==
Lovilla was laid out in 1853.

Coal was known north and south of Lovilia in the early 1900s, and there were scattered "country mines" in the area.

On March 30, 1953, there was a dust explosion at the O'Brien Mine, a coal mine near Lovilia. Two men, including the mine foreman, were in the mine to fire the black-powder shots at the end of the work shift. Both were killed in the blast. Volunteers from Lovilia went into the mine and brought out the bodies, and then the owner of the O'Brien mine, along with three officials of a nearby mine and an employee went underground to investigate. Of the five, only two survived; the others were overcome by bad air. The ensuing investigation determined that the dust explosion was caused by a blow-out in two of the blasted holes. A blow-out occurs when the force of the explosion blows the stemming out of a hole instead of breaking up the surrounding material. In the case of the O'Brien mine, the stemming used was a mix of coal dust and clay.

In 1972, the Lovilia Coal Company was operating one of the last two underground coal mines in Iowa. The mine employed 21 workers and produced 245,000 tons of coal that year. This was a room and pillar mine.

In 1985, the Star Coal Company of Lovilia was the largest employer in Monroe County, Iowa, with 150 employees. Coal production was 500,000 tons per year, about 80 percent of Iowa's total coal production.

== Geography ==
According to the United States Census Bureau, the city has a total area of 0.50 square miles (1.29 km^{2}), all land.

== Demographics ==
Historical populations
Year	Pop.	±%
1880	192	—
1890	336	+75.0%
1900	421	+25.3%
1910	552	+31.1%
1920	958	+73.6%
1930	727	−24.1%
1940	852	+17.2%
1950	619	−27.3%
1960	630	+1.8%
1970	640	+1.6%
1980	637	−0.5%
1990	566	−11.1%
2000	583	+3.0%
2010	538	−7.7%
2020	472	−12.3%
Source:"U.S. Census website". United States Census Bureau. and Iowa Data Center; Source: U.S. Decennial Census

=== 2020 census ===
As of the census of 2020, there were 472 people, 190 households, and 127 families residing in the city. The population density was 904.5 inhabitants per square mile (349.2/km^{2}). There were 212 housing units at an average density of 406.3 per square mile (156.9/km^{2}). The racial makeup of the city was 94.3% White, 0.0% Black or African American, 0.8% Native American, 0.0% Asian, 0.2% Pacific Islander, 0.0% from other races and 4.7% from two or more races. Hispanic or Latino persons of any race comprised 0.4% of the population.

Of the 190 households, 32.6% of which had children under the age of 18 living with them, 53.2% were married couples living together, 5.3% were cohabitating couples, 17.9% had a female householder with no spouse or partner present and 23.7% had a male householder with no spouse or partner present. 33.2% of all households were non-families. 28.4% of all households were made up of individuals, 16.3% had someone living alone who was 65 years old or older.

The median age in the city was 39.3 years. 26.5% of the residents were under the age of 20; 5.3% were between the ages of 20 and 24; 27.3% were from 25 and 44; 22.9% were from 45 and 64; and 18.0% were 65 years of age or older. The gender makeup of the city was 52.3% male and 47.7% female.

=== 2010 census ===
As of the census of 2010, there were 538 people, 207 households, and 149 families living in the city. The population density was 1,076.0 inhabitants per square mile (415.4/km^{2}). There were 228 housing units at an average density of 456.0 per square mile (176.1/km^{2}). The racial makeup of the city was 99.4% White, 0.2% African American, 0.2% Native American, and 0.2% from two or more races. Hispanic or Latino of any race were 0.7% of the population.

There were 207 households, of which 36.7% had children under the age of 18 living with them, 54.6% were married couples living together, 12.1% had a female householder with no husband present, 5.3% had a male householder with no wife present, and 28.0% were non-families. 26.6% of all households were made up of individuals, and 8.7% had someone living alone who was 65 years of age or older. The average household size was 2.60 and the average family size was 3.11.

The median age in the city was 34 years. 29.4% of residents were under the age of 18; 7.9% were between the ages of 18 and 24; 24.8% were from 25 to 44; 23.4% were from 45 to 64; and 14.3% were 65 years of age or older. The gender makeup of the city was 49.1% male and 50.9% female.

=== 2000 census ===
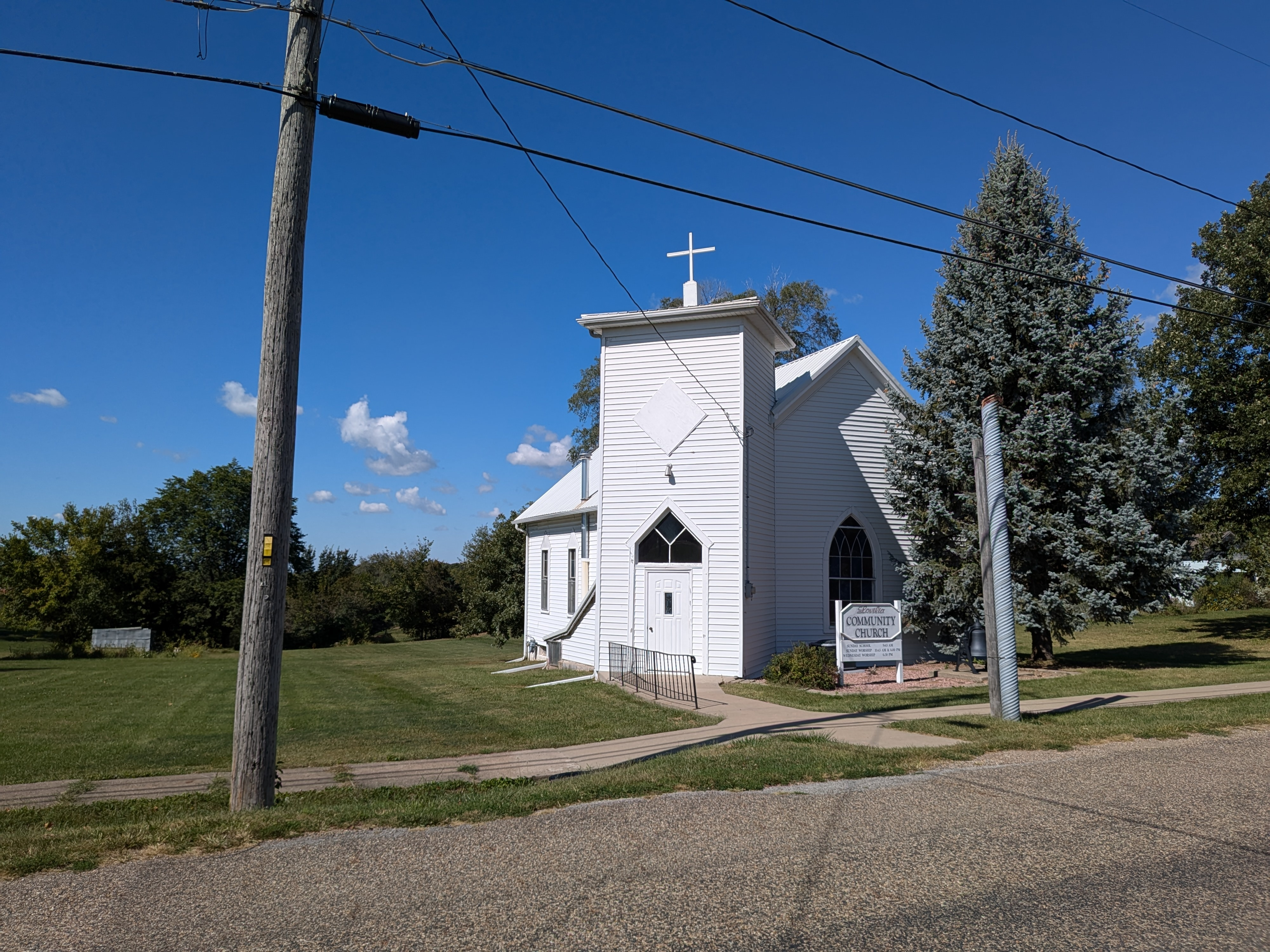
Lovilia Community Church

As of the census of 2000, there were 583 people, 228 households, and 163 families living in the city. The population density was 1,160.8 inhabitants per square mile (448.2/km^{2}). There were 247 housing units at an average density of 491.8 per square mile (189.9/km^{2}). The racial makeup of the city was 98.97% White, 0.17% African American, 0.17% Native American, and 0.69% from two or more races. Hispanic or Latino of any race were 0.17% of the population.

There were 228 households, out of which 39.9% had children under the age of 18 living with them, 57.5% were married couples living together, 11.0% had a female householder with no husband present, and 28.5% were non-families. 26.8% of all households were made up of individuals, and 15.8% had someone living alone who was 65 years of age or older. The average household size was 2.56 and the average family size was 3.08.

In the city, the population was spread out, with 31.4% under the age of 18, 6.9% from 18 to 24, 29.7% from 25 to 44, 17.5% from 45 to 64, and 14.6% who were 65 years of age or older. The median age was 33 years. For every 100 females, there were 100.3 males. For every 100 females age 18 and over, there were 95.1 males.

The median income for a household in the city was $35,577, and the median income for a family was $39,038. Males had a median income of $31,538 versus $19,712 for females. The per capita income for the city was $14,978. About 6.4% of families and 7.3% of the population were below the poverty line, including 9.8% of those under age 18 and 8.6% of those age 65 or over.

== Government and infrastructure ==
A building constructed c. 1901 became a post office in the 1930s. On October 4, 1965, a privately owned building that was to be leased by the U.S. Postal Service as a post office started construction. The post office facility opened in 1966.

== Education ==
Albia Community School District operates public schools serving the community.
