= Monroe County, Iowa =

County in Iowa, United States

- County
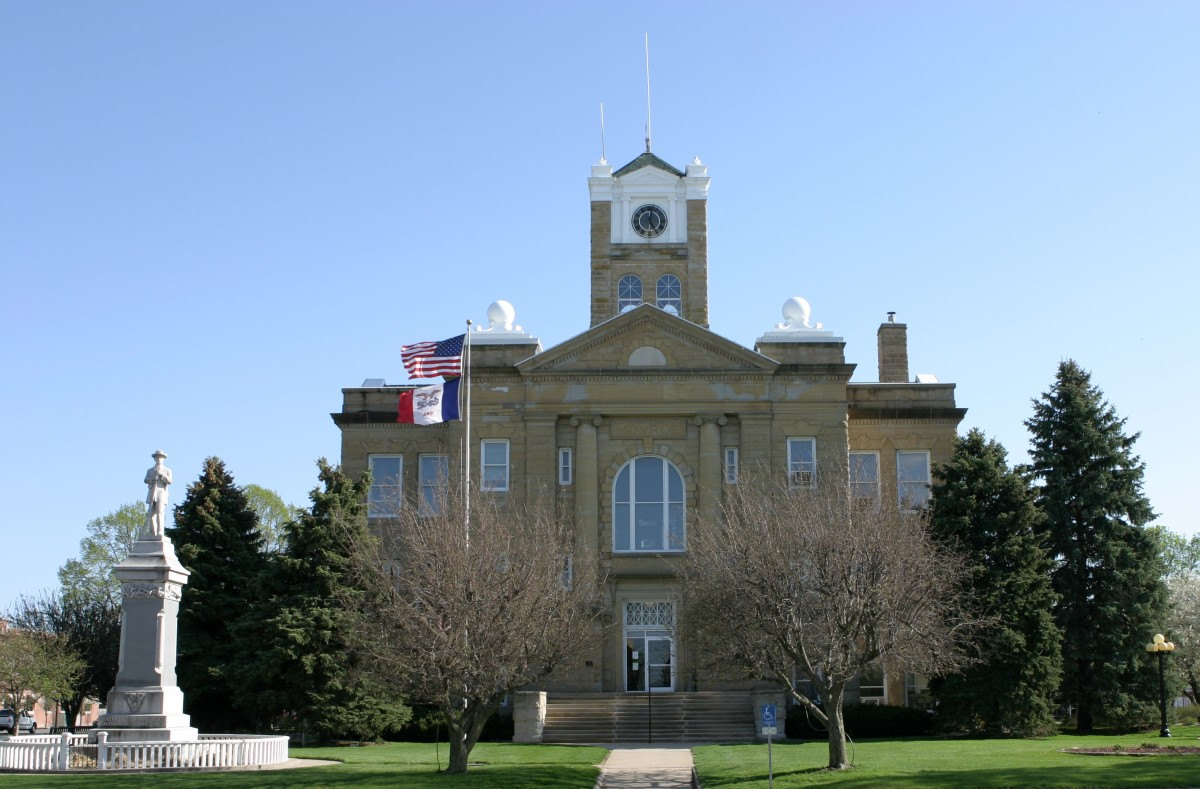
- The courthouse in Albia is on the NRHP

- Location within the U.S. state of Iowa
- Coordinates: 41°01′42″N 92°52′12″W
- Country: United States
- State: Iowa
- Founded: 1843
- Seat: Albia
- Largest city: Albia

Area
  - Total: 434 sq mi (1,120 km^{2})
  - Land: 434 sq mi (1,120 km^{2})
  - Water: 0.6 sq mi (1.6 km^{2}) 0.1%

Population (2020)
  - Total: 7,577
  - Estimate (2025): 7,406 ▼
  - Density: 17.5/sq mi (6.74/km^{2})
- Time zone: UTC−6 (Central)
  - Summer (DST): UTC−5 (CDT)
- Congressional district: 3rd
- Website: monroecounty.iowa.gov
- Iowa county number 68

Monroe County is a county located in the south central part of the U.S. state of Iowa. In the early 20th century, it was a center of bituminous coal mining and in 1910 had a population of more than 25,000. As mining declined, people moved elsewhere for work. As of the 2020 census, the population was 7,577. The county seat is Albia. The county, originally called Kishkekosh County after a famous chief of the Meskwaki, was renamed for James Monroe, fifth President of the United States.

== History ==
The county had a sizable Welsh American community at the turn of the 20th century. According to the 1900 census, 83.8% of the Welsh Americans in the country worked in coal mining.

== Geography ==
According to the United States Census Bureau, the county has a total area of 434 square miles (1,120 km^{2}), of which 434 square miles (1,120 km^{2}) is land and 0.6 square miles (1.6 km^{2}) (0.1%) is water.

=== Major highways ===
- U.S. Highway 34
- Iowa Highway 5
- Iowa Highway 137

=== Adjacent counties ===
- Marion County (northwest)
- Mahaska County (northeast)
- Wapello County (east)
- Appanoose County (south)
- Lucas County (west)

== Demographics ==
Historical population
Census	Pop.	Note	%±
1850	2,884		—
1860	8,612		198.6%
1870	12,724		47.7%
1880	13,719		7.8%
1890	13,666		−0.4%
1900	17,985		31.6%
1910	25,429		41.4%
1920	23,467		−7.7%
1930	15,010		−36.0%
1940	14,553		−3.0%
1950	11,814		−18.8%
1960	10,463		−11.4%
1970	9,357		−10.6%
1980	9,209		−1.6%
1990	8,114		−11.9%
2000	8,016		−1.2%
2010	7,970		−0.6%
2020	7,577		−4.9%
2025 (est.)	7,406	▼	−2.3%
U.S. Decennial Census; 1790–1960 1900–1990; 1990–2000 2010–2020

=== 2020 census ===
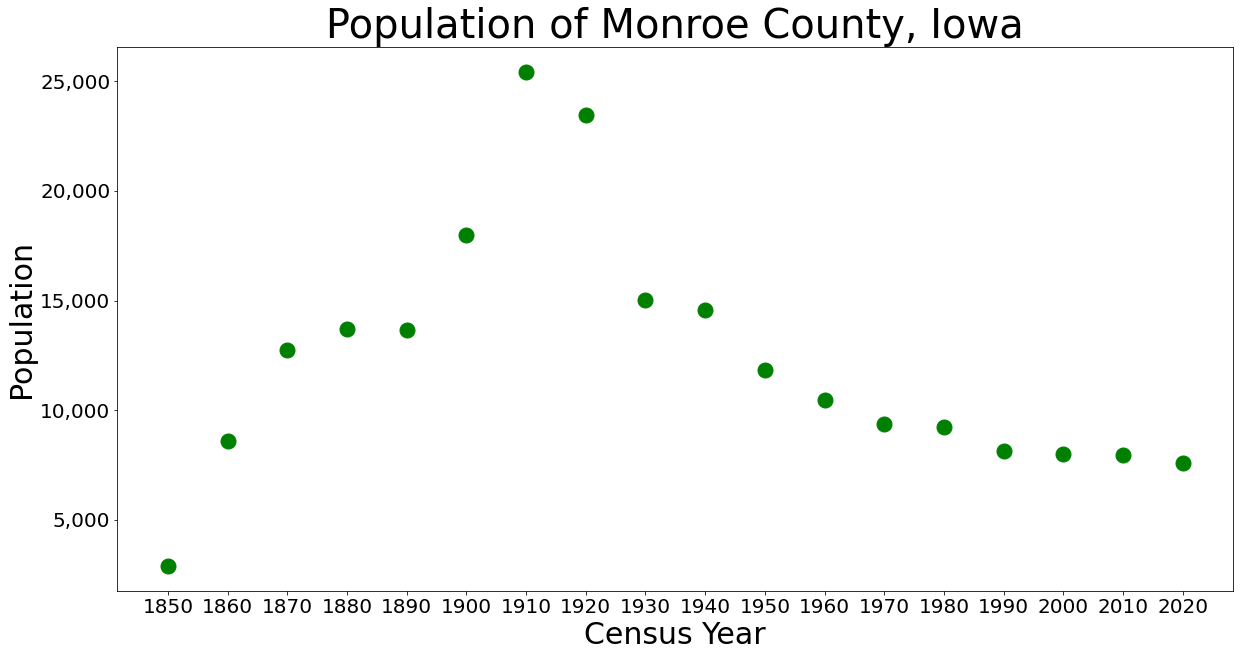
Population of Monroe County from the U.S. census data

As of the 2020 census, the county had a population of 7,577 and a population density of 17.5/sq mi (6.8/km^{2}). The median age was 42.6 years, 23.5% of residents were under the age of 18, and 21.7% of residents were 65 years of age or older. For every 100 females there were 99.4 males, and for every 100 females age 18 and over there were 98.2 males age 18 and over.

96.86% of residents reported being of one race. The racial makeup of the county was 95.4% White, 0.3% Black or African American, 0.2% American Indian and Alaska Native, 0.2% Asian, <0.1% Native Hawaiian and Pacific Islander, 0.8% from some other race, and 3.1% from two or more races. Hispanic or Latino residents of any race comprised 1.5% of the population. Less than 0.1% of residents lived in urban areas, while 100.0% lived in rural areas.

There were 3,116 households in the county, of which 28.4% had children under the age of 18 living in them. Of all households, 52.1% were married-couple households, 19.0% were households with a male householder and no spouse or partner present, and 22.8% were households with a female householder and no spouse or partner present. About 28.5% of all households were made up of individuals and 14.2% had someone living alone who was 65 years of age or older. There were 3,636 housing units, of which 14.3% were vacant. Among occupied housing units, 76.3% were owner-occupied and 23.7% were renter-occupied. The homeowner vacancy rate was 1.7% and the rental vacancy rate was 7.1%.

=== 2010 census ===
As of the 2010 census recorded a population of 7,970 in the county, with a population density of 18.4/sq mi (7.1/km^{2}). There were 3,884 housing units, of which 3,213 were occupied.

=== 2000 census ===
As of the 2000 census, there were 8,016 people, 3,228 households, and 2,211 families in the county. The population density was 18 people per square mile (6.9 people/km^{2}). There were 3,588 housing units at an average density of 8 units per square mile (3.1 units/km^{2}). The racial makeup of the county was 98.40% White, 0.20% Black or African American, 0.36% Native American, 0.40% Asian, 0.12% from other races, and 0.51% from two or more races. 0.50% of the population were Hispanic or Latino of any race.

There were 3,228 households, 30.50% had children under the age of 18 living with them, 56.20% were married couples living together, 8.60% had a female householder with no husband present, and 31.50% were non-families. 28.00% of households were one person, and 15.30% were one person aged 65 or older. The average household size was 2.43 and the average family size was 2.97.

In the county, the population was spread out, with 25.30% under the age of 18, 7.20% from 18 to 24, 25.00% from 25 to 44, 23.00% from 45 to 64, and 19.50% 65 or older. The median age was 40 years. For every 100 females there were 94.90 males. For every 100 females age 18 and over, there were 92.60 males.

The median household income was $34,877 and the median family income was $41,611. Males had a median income of $31,667 versus $21,401 for females. The per capita income for the county was $17,155. About 5.60% of families and 9.00% of the population were below the poverty line, including 12.20% of those under age 18 and 5.90% of those age 65 or over.

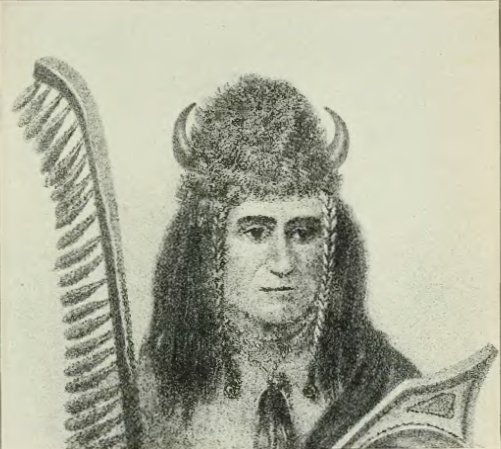
Chief Kishkekosh of the Meskwaki, after whom the county was originally named

== Communities ==
=== Cities ===
- Albia
- Eddyville
- Lovilia
- Melrose

=== Unincorporated communities ===
- Avery
- Tyrone

=== Ghost town ===
- Buxton, the largest town with a majority-black population in the early 20th century

=== Townships ===
- Bluff Creek
- Cedar
- Franklin
- Guilford
- Jackson
- Mantua
- Monroe
- Pleasant
- Troy
- Union
- Urbana
- Wayne

=== Population ranking ===
The population ranking of the following table is based on the 2020 census of Monroe County.

† county seat

Rank	City/Town/etc.	Municipal type	Population (2020 Census)	Population (2024 Estimate)
1	† Albia	City	3,721	3,713
2	Eddyville (mostly in Mahaska and Wapello Counties)	City	970	984
3	Moravia (mostly in Appanoose County)	City	637	632
4	Lovilia	City	472	460
5	Melrose	City	110	100

== Politics ==
United States presidential election results for Monroe County, Iowa
Year	Republican		Democratic		Third party(ies)	
Year	No.	%	No.	%	No.	%
1896	1,836	45.69%	2,086	51.92%	96	2.39%
1900	2,233	51.62%	1,705	39.41%	388	8.97%
1904	3,249	62.17%	1,182	22.62%	795	15.21%
1908	2,686	51.58%	1,979	38.01%	542	10.41%
1912	1,385	26.22%	1,485	28.11%	2,412	45.66%
1916	2,144	45.15%	2,095	44.11%	510	10.74%
1920	4,500	61.21%	2,081	28.31%	771	10.49%
1924	4,098	50.92%	1,388	17.25%	2,562	31.83%
1928	4,060	58.16%	2,819	40.38%	102	1.46%
1932	2,458	38.25%	3,716	57.83%	252	3.92%
1936	3,001	40.22%	4,205	56.36%	255	3.42%
1940	3,270	44.57%	3,994	54.44%	72	0.98%
1944	2,625	44.27%	3,258	54.95%	46	0.78%
1948	2,371	40.01%	3,445	58.13%	110	1.86%
1952	3,219	53.28%	2,785	46.09%	38	0.63%
1956	2,984	53.17%	2,616	46.61%	12	0.21%
1960	2,922	54.20%	2,459	45.61%	10	0.19%
1964	1,588	33.15%	3,186	66.50%	17	0.35%
1968	2,143	45.55%	2,240	47.61%	322	6.84%
1972	2,357	56.73%	1,736	41.78%	62	1.49%
1976	1,581	39.56%	2,360	59.06%	55	1.38%
1980	2,003	48.65%	1,866	45.32%	248	6.02%
1984	1,927	44.91%	2,342	54.58%	22	0.51%
1988	1,313	35.81%	2,338	63.76%	16	0.44%
1992	1,323	34.98%	1,829	48.36%	630	16.66%
1996	1,272	36.21%	1,884	53.63%	357	10.16%
2000	1,858	50.95%	1,699	46.59%	90	2.47%
2004	2,067	52.16%	1,855	46.81%	41	1.03%
2008	2,000	51.63%	1,798	46.41%	76	1.96%
2012	2,026	52.90%	1,731	45.20%	73	1.91%
2016	2,638	68.25%	1,056	27.32%	171	4.42%
2020	2,975	72.77%	1,078	26.37%	35	0.86%
2024	3,104	74.65%	1,002	24.10%	52	1.25%

== Education ==
School districts include:

- Albia Community School District
- Eddyville-Blakesburg-Fremont Community School District - Formed on July 1, 2012.
- Moravia Community School District

Former school districts

- Eddyville-Blakesburg Community School District - Merged into Eddyville-Blakesburg-Fremont on July 1, 2012.
- Russell Community School District - Involuntarily dissolved on January 1, 2008.

== See also ==
- Monroe County Courthouse
- National Register of Historic Places listings in Monroe County, Iowa
