= Albia, Iowa =

- City
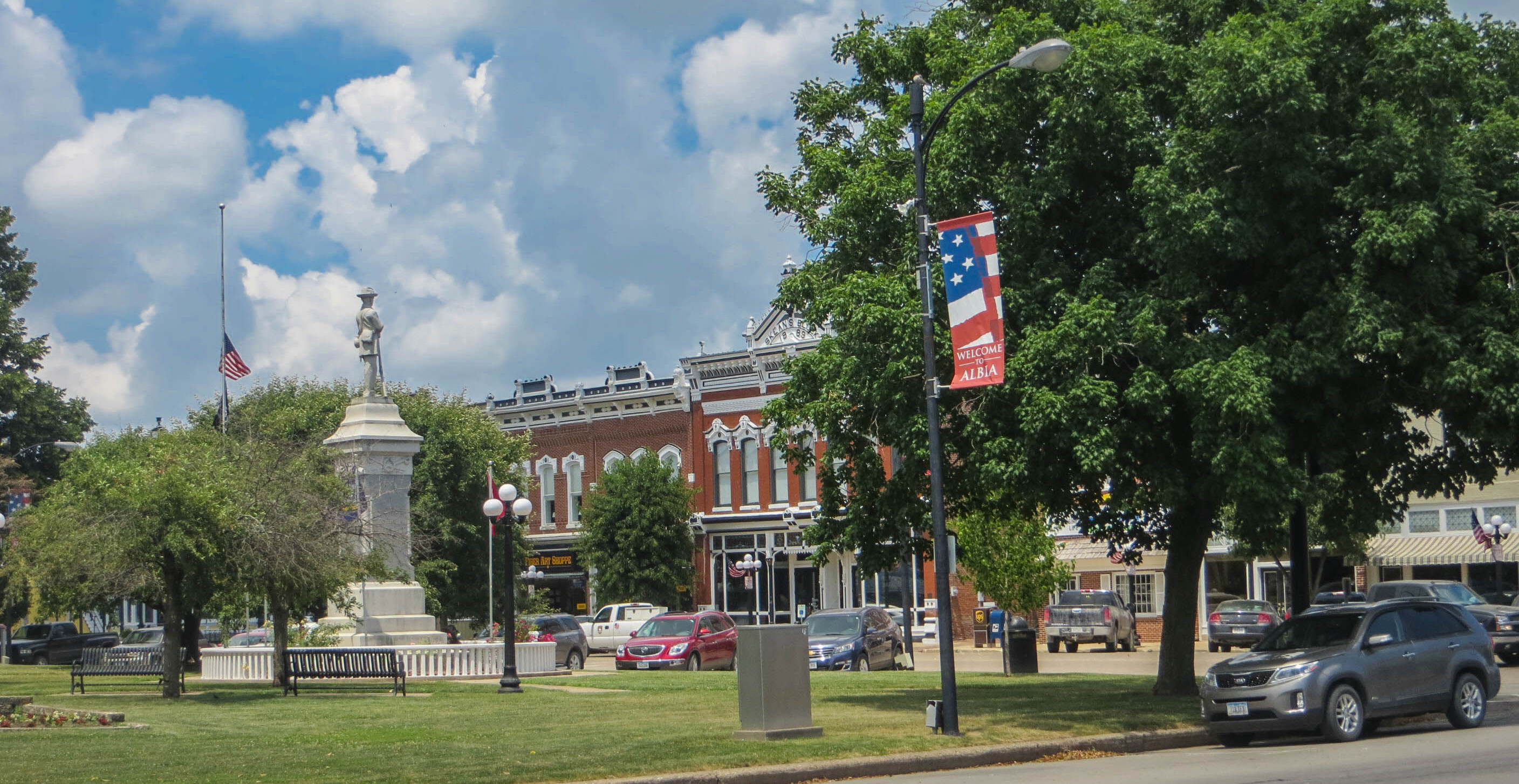
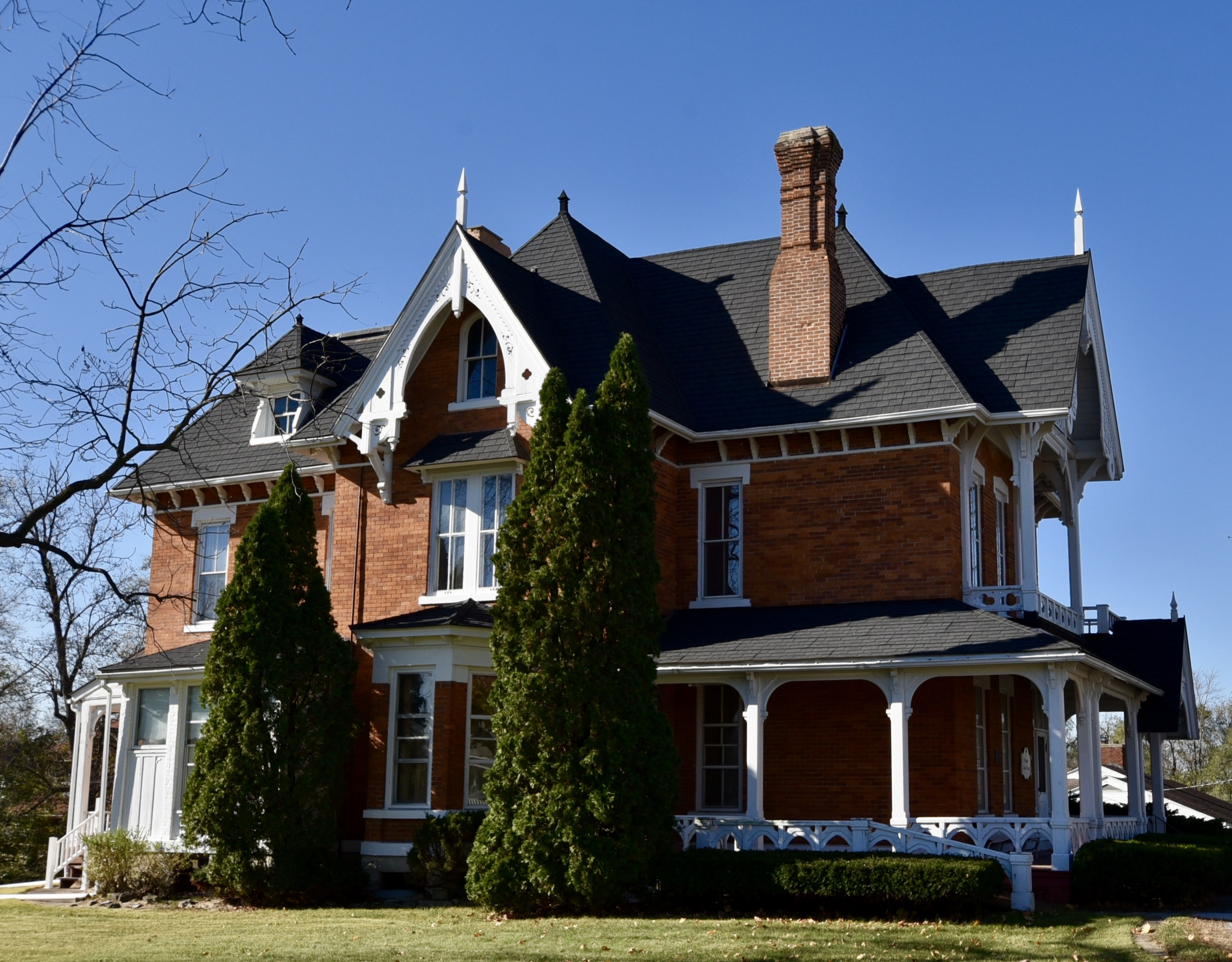
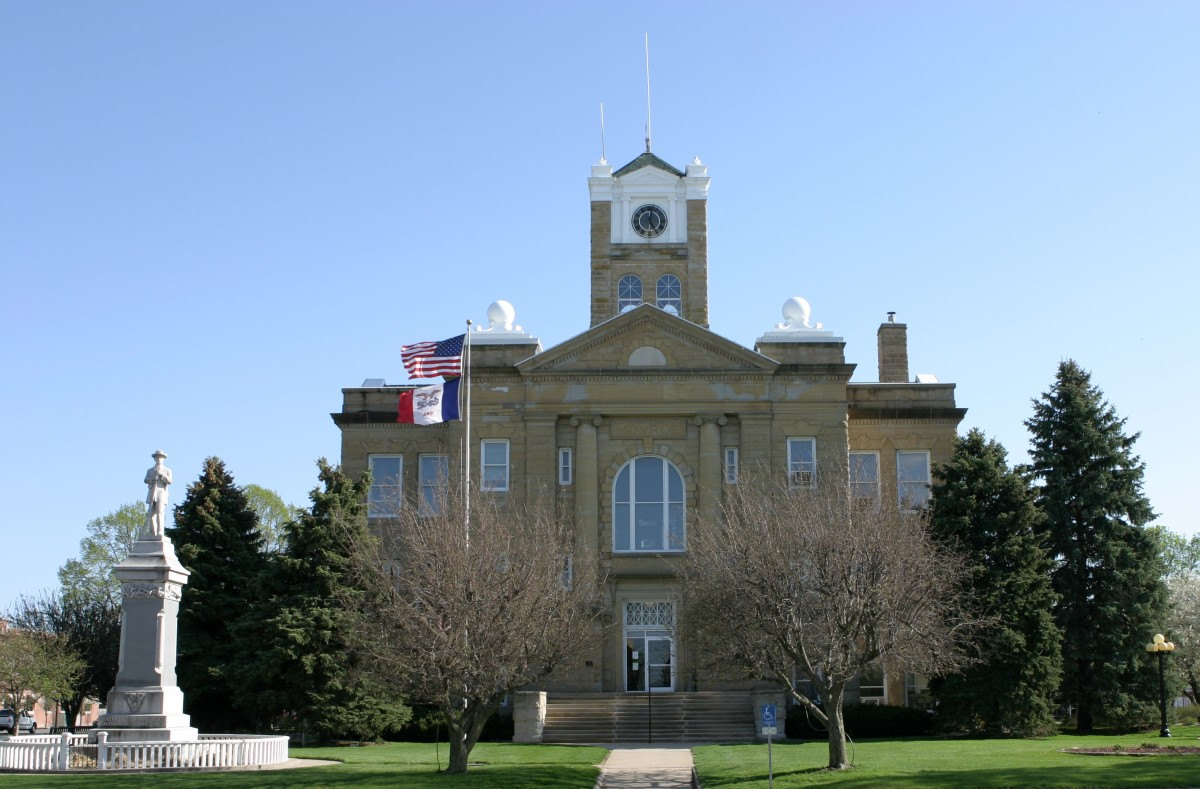
- Albia Square and Commercial Historic District T.B. Perry House Monroe County Courthouse

- Location within Monroe County and Iowa
- Coordinates: 41°01′35″N 92°48′14″W
- Country: United States
- State: Iowa
- County: Monroe

Area
  - Total: 3.23 sq mi (8.37 km^{2})
  - Land: 3.23 sq mi (8.37 km^{2})
  - Water: 0 sq mi (0.00 km^{2})
- Elevation: 961 ft (293 m)

Population (2020)
  - Total: 3,721
  - Density: 1,151/sq mi (444.5/km^{2})
- Time zone: UTC-6 (Central (CST))
  - Summer (DST): UTC-5 (CDT)
- ZIP code: 52531
- Area code: 641
- FIPS code: 19-00910
- GNIS feature ID: 2393905
- Website: albiaiowa.org

Albia is a city in and the county seat of Monroe County, in southern Iowa, United States. The population was 3,721 at the 2020 census. Albia is located at the junction of U.S. Route 34 and Iowa Highways 137 and 5. The city of Albia and the surrounding area was a past center for coal mining in Iowa, and is now known for its historic square, and collection of Victorian, Tudor, Gothic, and Italianate homes.

== History ==
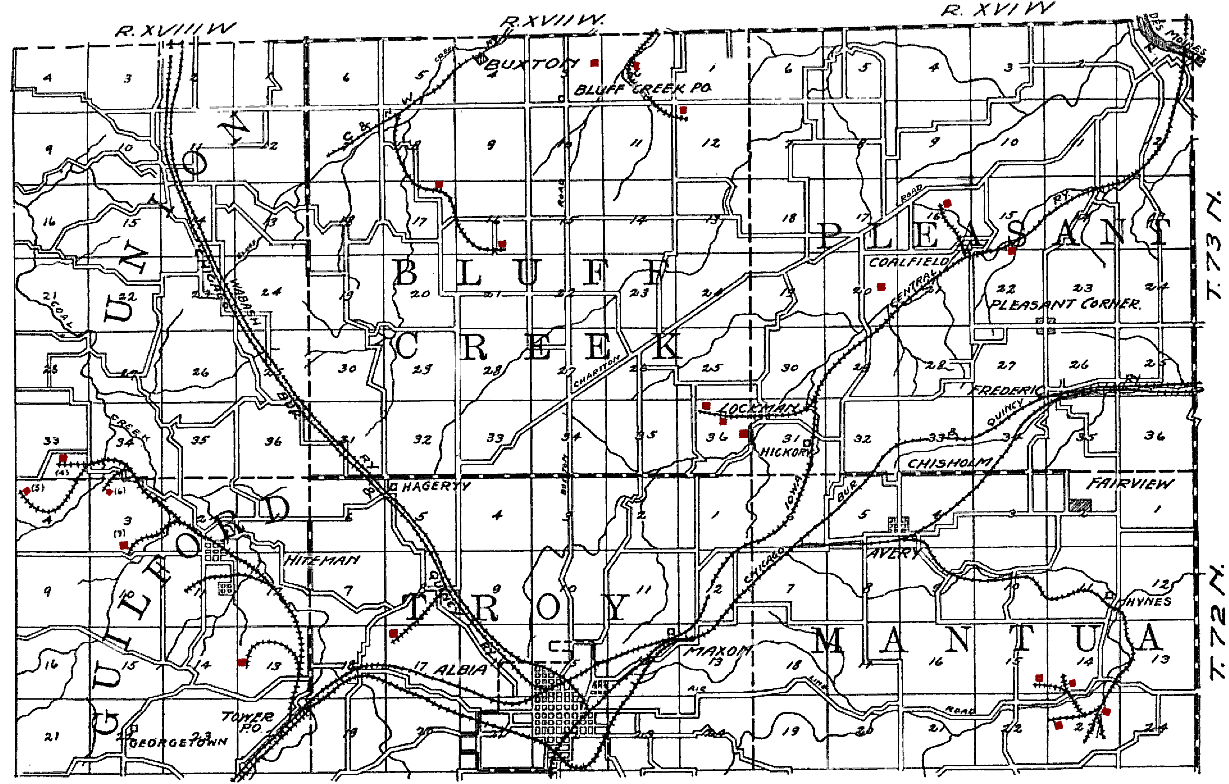
Map of the Albia area from 1908, showing the railroads, mining camps and coal mines (shown in red).

Albia was incorporated as a town in 1856. The town was named after Albia, New York, the former home of an early settler.

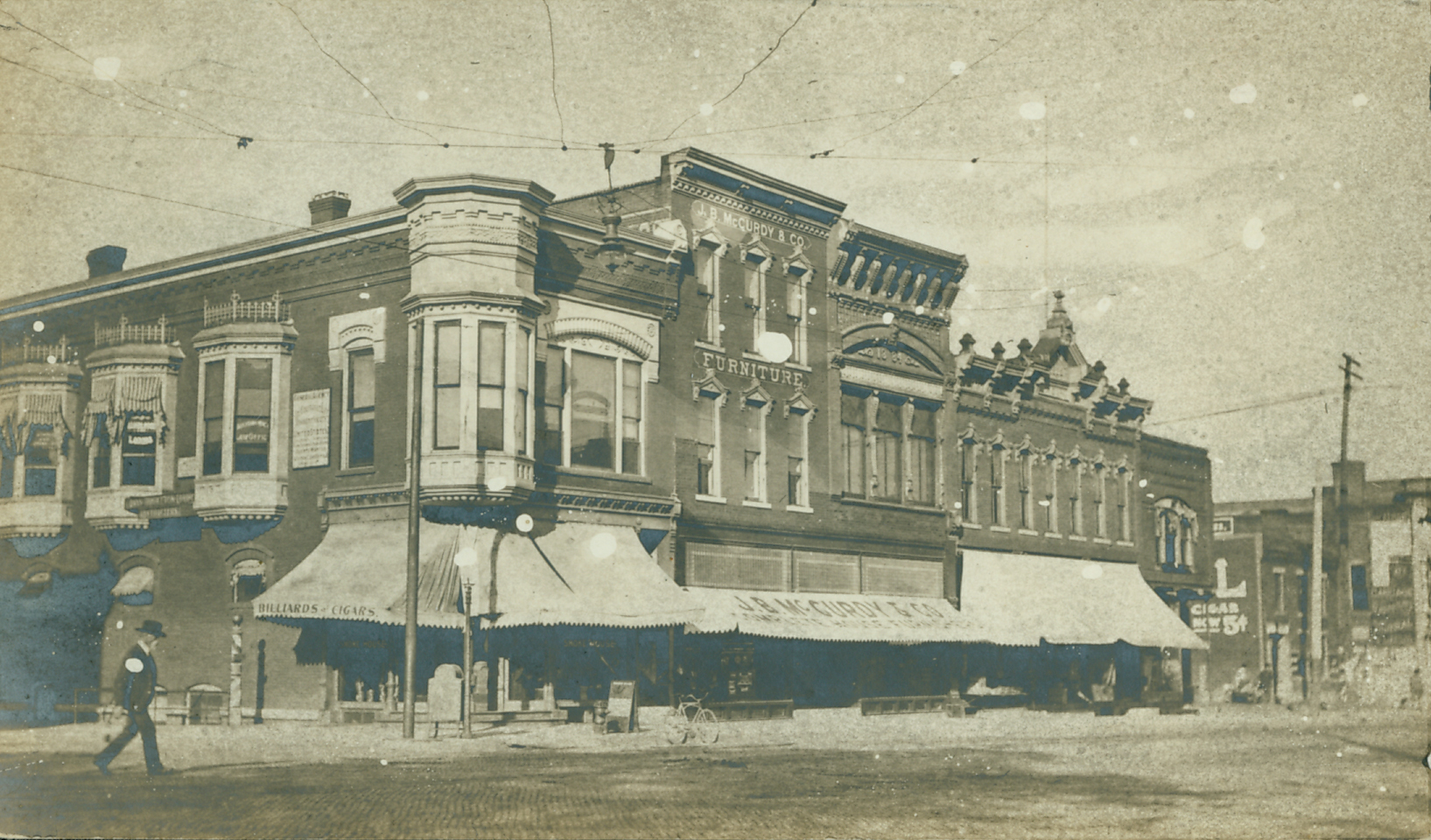
Main Street, 1890

On Feb. 14, 1893, there was a coal mine explosion in the Chicago and Iowa mine, about 2.5 miles west of Albia. This room and pillar mine had opened around 1877. By the time of the explosion, mining extended more than 1,000 yards from the hoisting shaft, and the mine employed 60 miners and 20 other men. One miner was killed outright and seven died later of their injuries, after a "shot" (gunpowder charge used to bring down the coal) ignited a dust explosion in the mine. This was one of only two major mine disasters in Iowa between 1888 and 1913.

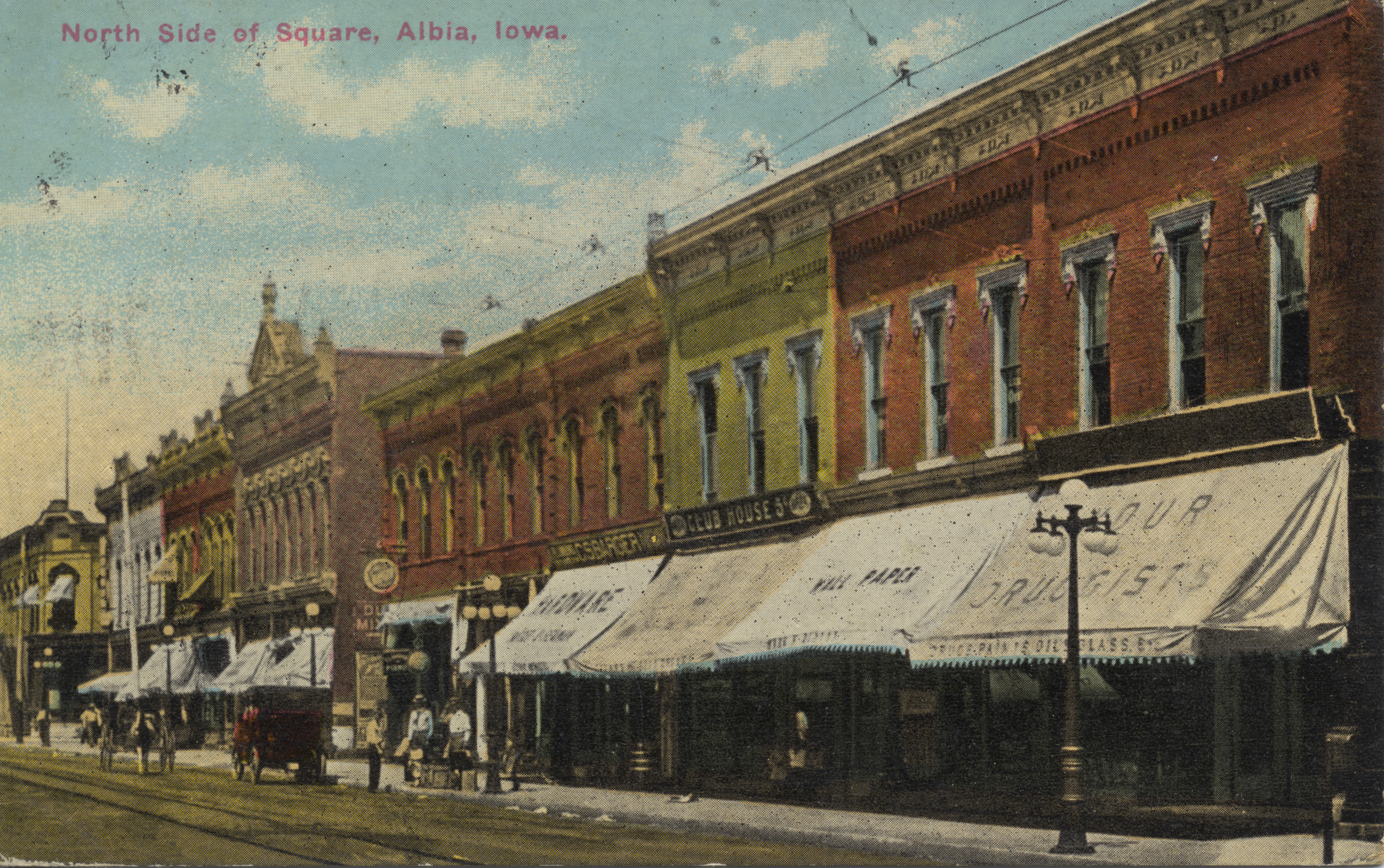
Historical North Side of Square

In the early 20th century, the region around Albia was dotted with coal mining camps and company towns. Of these, Buxton, 9 miles north of Albia, is the most widely studied. It had a large Black population. Other former coal camps in the area include Hiteman, Bluff Creek, Lockman, Coalfield, Hocking, and Hynes.

The growth in membership in the United Mine Workers union, as shown by the following data, is a useful measure of the importance of mining in the region. In 1902, UMW Locals 692 and 793 in Albia had an aggregate membership of 216. By 1912, UMW Locals 407, 782 and 793 in Albia had an aggregate membership of 338 (about 7.2% of the 1910 population). Miners in Hiteman, 5 miles northwest of town, joined the UMWA in 1898; between 1902 and 1912, membership grew from 450 to 688. Miners in Hynes, 7 miles east, joined the UMWA in 1896; between 1902 and 1912, membership grew from 330 to 543.

== Geography ==
According to the United States Census Bureau, the city has a total area of 3.19 square miles (8.26 km^{2}), all land.

=== Climate ===
According to the Köppen Climate Classification system, Albia has a hot-summer humid continental climate, abbreviated "Dfa" on climate maps.

Climate data for Albia, Iowa (elev. 880 feet), 1991–2020 normals, extremes 1894–present
Month	Jan	Feb	Mar	Apr	May	Jun	Jul	Aug	Sep	Oct	Nov	Dec	Year
Record high °F (°C)	71 (22)	79 (26)	90 (32)	93 (34)	104 (40)	105 (41)	110 (43)	113 (45)	104 (40)	96 (36)	82 (28)	71 (22)	113 (45)
Mean maximum °F (°C)	55.1 (12.8)	59.4 (15.2)	73.2 (22.9)	81.2 (27.3)	86.0 (30.0)	90.3 (32.4)	94.2 (34.6)	93.8 (34.3)	89.6 (32.0)	82.6 (28.1)	70.2 (21.2)	58.9 (14.9)	96.0 (35.6)
Mean daily maximum °F (°C)	31.3 (−0.4)	35.9 (2.2)	48.7 (9.3)	61.4 (16.3)	70.9 (21.6)	80.2 (26.8)	84.4 (29.1)	82.8 (28.2)	76.0 (24.4)	63.4 (17.4)	49.0 (9.4)	36.5 (2.5)	60.0 (15.6)
Daily mean °F (°C)	22.2 (−5.4)	26.3 (−3.2)	38.3 (3.5)	50.1 (10.1)	60.7 (15.9)	70.4 (21.3)	74.5 (23.6)	72.6 (22.6)	64.8 (18.2)	52.6 (11.4)	39.2 (4.0)	27.9 (−2.3)	50.0 (10.0)
Mean daily minimum °F (°C)	13.2 (−10.4)	16.8 (−8.4)	28.0 (−2.2)	38.8 (3.8)	50.5 (10.3)	60.6 (15.9)	64.6 (18.1)	62.4 (16.9)	53.5 (11.9)	41.8 (5.4)	29.5 (−1.4)	19.3 (−7.1)	39.9 (4.4)
Mean minimum °F (°C)	−9.0 (−22.8)	−4.1 (−20.1)	7.1 (−13.8)	24.1 (−4.4)	35.1 (1.7)	47.1 (8.4)	53.3 (11.8)	51.2 (10.7)	37.7 (3.2)	25.8 (−3.4)	12.2 (−11.0)	−1.6 (−18.7)	−12.8 (−24.9)
Record low °F (°C)	−29 (−34)	−31 (−35)	−15 (−26)	8 (−13)	21 (−6)	37 (3)	41 (5)	36 (2)	22 (−6)	5 (−15)	−8 (−22)	−26 (−32)	−31 (−35)
Average precipitation inches (mm)	1.13 (29)	1.49 (38)	2.02 (51)	3.77 (96)	4.86 (123)	5.18 (132)	4.02 (102)	4.04 (103)	3.57 (91)	2.80 (71)	2.14 (54)	1.47 (37)	36.49 (927)
Average snowfall inches (cm)	7.4 (19)	8.4 (21)	3.9 (9.9)	1.1 (2.8)	0.0 (0.0)	0.0 (0.0)	0.0 (0.0)	0.0 (0.0)	0.0 (0.0)	0.4 (1.0)	1.9 (4.8)	6.9 (18)	30 (76.5)
Average precipitation days (≥ 0.01 in)	6.6	7.3	8.3	10.8	12.4	11.7	8.9	9.1	7.8	8.4	6.8	7.0	105.1
Average snowy days (≥ 0.1 in)	4.3	4.4	2.1	0.4	0.0	0.0	0.0	0.0	0.0	0.2	1.1	3.7	16.2
Source 1: NOAA
Source 2: National Weather Service

== Demographics ==
Historical populations
Year	Pop.	±%
1860	620	—
1870	1,621	+161.5%
1880	2,435	+50.2%
1890	2,359	−3.1%
1900	2,889	+22.5%
1910	4,969	+72.0%
1920	5,067	+2.0%
1930	4,425	−12.7%
1940	5,157	+16.5%
1950	4,838	−6.2%
1960	4,582	−5.3%
1970	4,151	−9.4%
1980	4,184	+0.8%
1990	3,870	−7.5%
2000	3,706	−4.2%
2010	3,766	+1.6%
2020	3,721	−1.2%
Iowa Data Center; Source: U.S. Decennial Census,

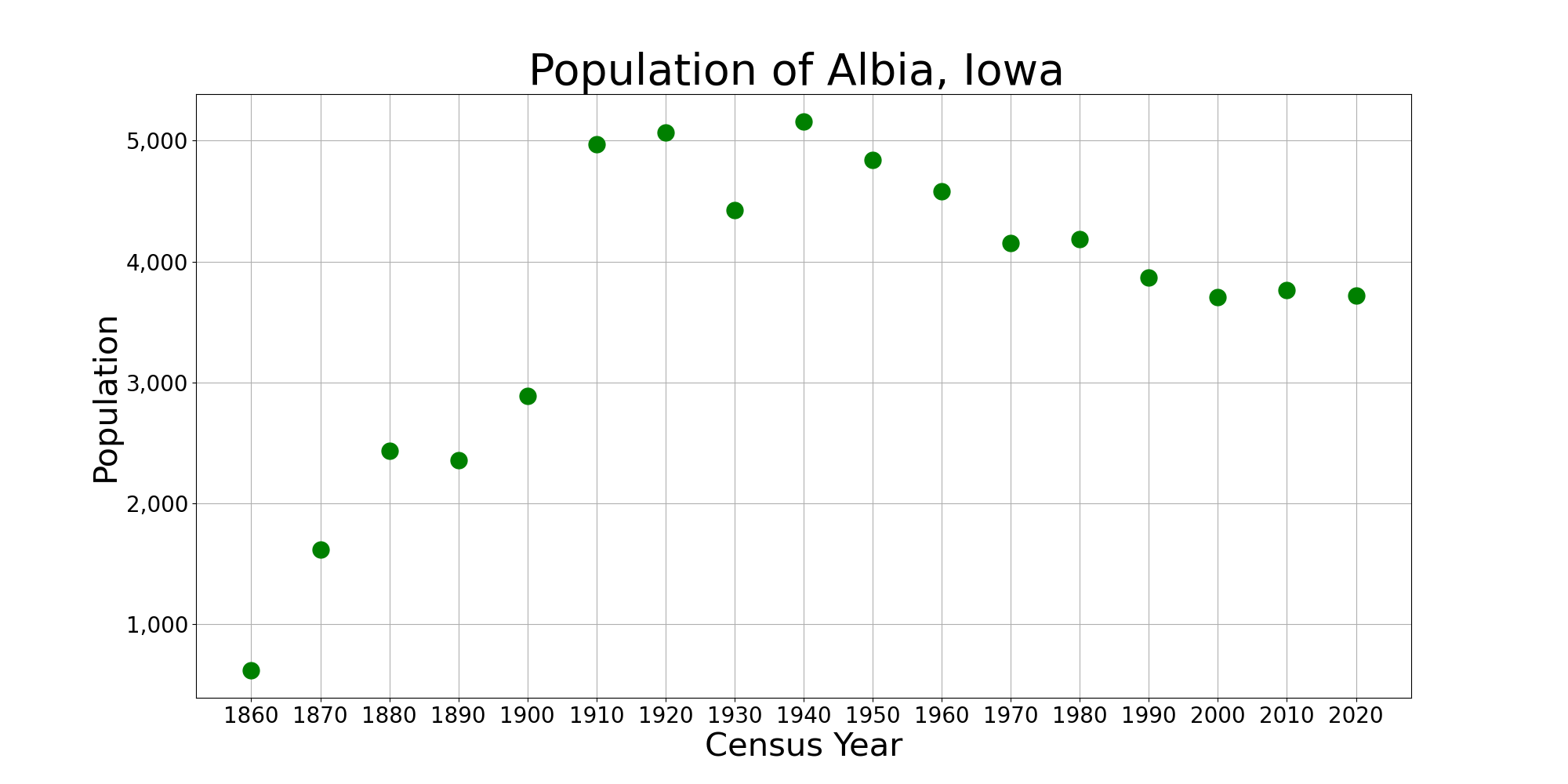
The population of Albia, Iowa from US census data

=== 2020 census ===
As of the 2020 census, there were 3,721 people, 1,545 households, and 943 families residing in the city. The population density was 1,151.2 inhabitants per square mile (444.5/km^{2}). There were 1,703 housing units at an average density of 526.9 per square mile (203.4/km^{2}); 9.3% of housing units were vacant. The homeowner vacancy rate was 1.3% and the rental vacancy rate was 6.1%.

The median age in the city was 38.6 years. The age distribution was 27.5% under the age of 20; 6.7% from 20 to 24; 23.3% from 25 to 44; 23.1% from 45 to 64; and 19.5% who were 65 years of age or older. In addition, 25.5% of residents were under the age of 18. The gender makeup of the city was 48.2% male and 51.8% female. For every 100 females there were 93.0 males, and for every 100 females age 18 and over there were 88.3 males age 18 and over.

0.0% of residents lived in urban areas, while 100.0% lived in rural areas.

Of households, 32.2% had children under the age of 18 living with them. Of all households, 42.5% were married-couple households, 7.2% were cohabitating-couple households, 19.0% were households with a male householder and no spouse or partner present, and 31.3% were households with a female householder and no spouse or partner present. About 39.0% of households were non-families, 32.9% were made up of individuals, and 16.2% had someone living alone who was 65 years of age or older.

Racial composition as of the 2020 census
Race	Number	Percent
White	3,503	94.1%
Black or African American	18	0.5%
American Indian and Alaska Native	1	0.0%
Asian	11	0.3%
Native Hawaiian and Other Pacific Islander	1	0.0%
Some other race	40	1.1%
Two or more races	147	4.0%
Hispanic or Latino (of any race)	88	2.4%

=== 2010 census ===
As of the census of 2010, there were 3,766 people, 1,540 households, and 960 families living in the city. The population density was 1,180.6 inhabitants per square mile (455.8/km^{2}). There were 1,763 housing units at an average density of 552.7 per square mile (213.4/km^{2}). The racial makeup of the city was 97.5% White, 0.3% African American, 0.2% Native American, 0.3% Asian, 0.4% from other races, and 1.3% from two or more races. Hispanic or Latino of any race were 1.9% of the population.

There were 1,540 households, of which 30.6% had children under the age of 18 living with them, 45.3% were married couples living together, 11.4% had a female householder with no husband present, 5.7% had a male householder with no wife present, and 37.7% were non-families. 32.5% of all households were made up of individuals, and 15.6% had someone living alone who was 65 years of age or older. The average household size was 2.37 and the average family size was 2.98.

The median age in the city was 40 years. 25.1% of residents were under the age of 18; 8.1% were between the ages of 18 and 24; 22.5% were from 25 to 44; 24.5% were from 45 to 64; and 19.8% were 65 years of age or older. The gender makeup of the city was 48.5% male and 51.5% female.

=== 2000 census ===
As of the census of 2000, there were 3,706 people, 1,531 households, and 943 families living in the city. The population density was 1,184.8 inhabitants per square mile (457.5/km^{2}). There were 1,708 housing units at an average density of 546.0 per square mile (210.8/km^{2}). The racial makeup of the city was 97.92% White, 0.32% African American, 0.32% Native American, 0.62% Asian, 0.24% from other races, and 0.57% from two or more races. Hispanic or Latino of any race were 0.84% of the population.

There were 1,531 households, out of which 29.8% had children under the age of 18 living with them, 46.8% were married couples living together, 11.5% had a female householder with no husband present, and 38.4% were non-families. 33.9% of all households were made up of individuals, and 19.2% had someone living alone who was 65 years of age or older. The average household size was 2.31 and the average family size was 2.97.

Age spread: 25.1% under the age of 18, 7.9% from 18 to 24, 24.2% from 25 to 44, 19.8% from 45 to 64, and 22.9% who were 65 years of age or older. The median age was 39 years. For every 100 females, there were 85.5 males. For every 100 females age 18 and over, there were 80.5 males.

The median income for a household in the city was $31,728, and the median income for a family was $41,607. Males had a median income of $33,025 versus $20,933 for females. The per capita income for the city was $16,843. About 4.3% of families and 9.2% of the population were below the poverty line, including 10.1% of those under age 18 and 4.7% of those age 65 or over.

== Education ==
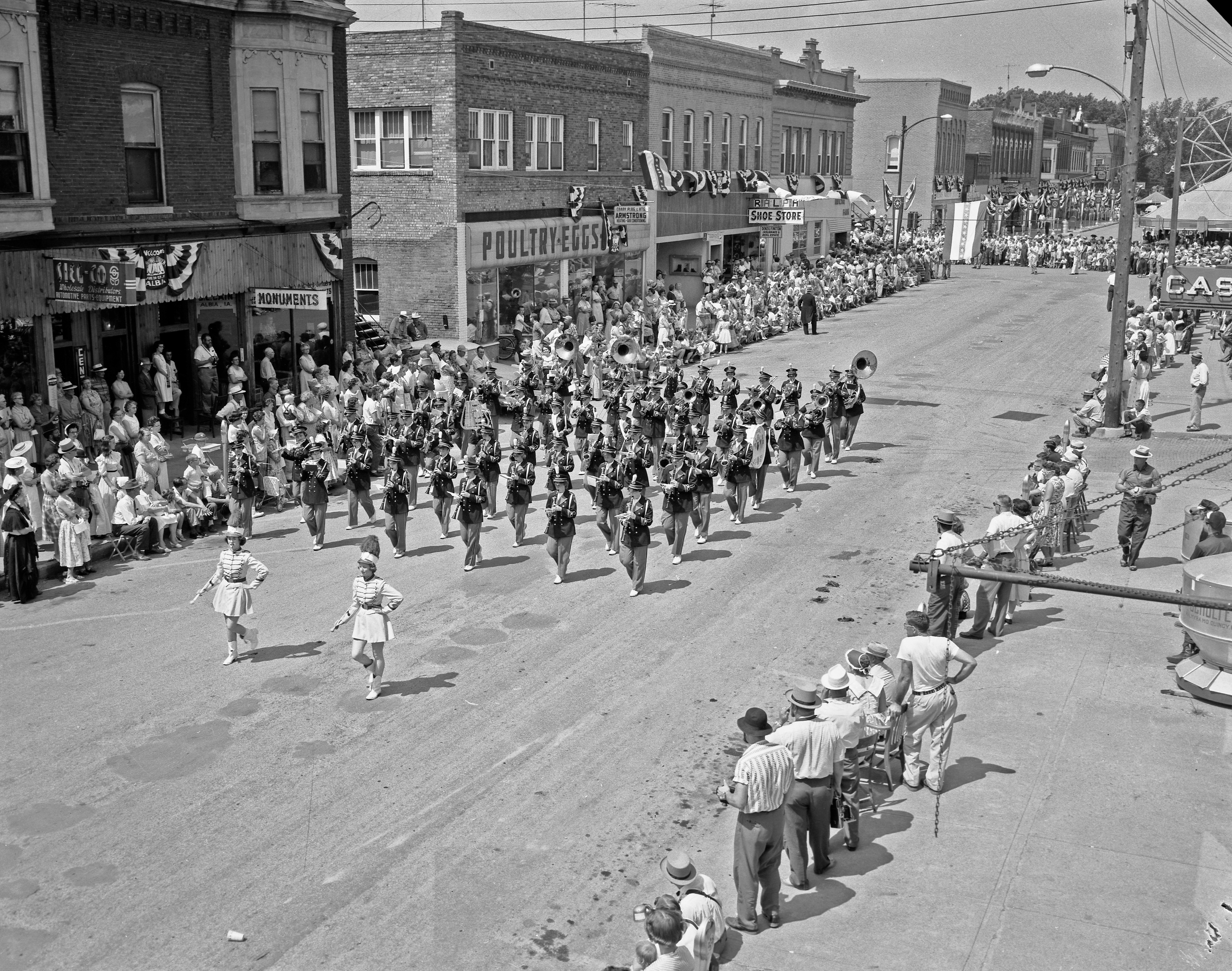
A parade outside Town Square, 1959

Albia Community School District operates public schools serving the community.

== Activities ==
In Albia, there's the "Monroe Aquatic Center", "Washington Park", and the "City Park". The aquatic center has two water slides, low dive, high dive, children's area, basketball hoops above the water, and lockers. The city park includes a basketball court, a baseball field, a tennis court, and a playground with swings.

== Notable people ==
- George Bennard (1873–1958), composer of "The Old Rugged Cross"
- Nathan E. Kendall (1868–1936) politician, the 23rd governor of Iowa
- John Judge (born 1944), politician, served in the Iowa State Senate
- Patty Judge (born 1943), politician, State Senator and Lieutenant Governor of Iowa
- Johnny Miler, né Miletich (1910–1976) Boxer, defeated Joe Louis in amateur bout
- Wendell Nedderman (1921–2019), president of The University of Texas at Arlington from 1972 to 1992
- Theodore Bolivar Perry, politician
- James Stevens (1892–1971), musician and writer, most notably Paul Bunyan
- Fred Townsend (1862–1918), politician and Iowa legislator, football player
- Josiah T. Young (1831–1907), Iowa Secretary of State, and mayor of Albia
- Taylor Yarkosky (born 1977), politician - Member of the Florida House of Representatives
