= National Register of Historic Places listings in Appanoose County, Iowa =

Location of Appanoose County in Iowa

This is a list of the National Register of Historic Places listings in Appanoose County, Iowa.

This is intended to be a complete list of the properties and districts on the National Register of Historic Places in Appanoose County, Iowa, United States. Latitude and longitude coordinates are provided for many National Register properties and districts; these locations may be seen together in a map.

There are 13 properties and districts listed on the National Register in the county.

This National Park Service list is complete through NPS recent listings posted March 21, 2025.

	Name on the Register	Image	Date listed	Location	City or town	Description
1	Appanoose County Courthouse	Appanoose County Courthouse	July 2, 1981 (#81000225)	Van Buren and N. 12th St. 40°44′02″N 92°52′28″W	Centerville	
2	Appanoose County Sheriff's House and Jail	Appanoose County Sheriff's House and Jail	October 30, 1997 (#97001292)	527 N. Main St. 40°44′02″N 92°52′54″W	Centerville	
3	CB&Q Passenger Depot	CB&Q Passenger Depot	August 28, 2003 (#03000833)	1124 S. 18th St. 40°43′24″N 92°52′05″W	Centerville	
4	Courthouse Square Historic District	Courthouse Square Historic District	October 30, 1997 (#97001291)	Roughly bounded by Van Buren, Haynes, Maple, and 10th Sts. 40°44′01″N 92°52′23″W	Centerville	
5	Drake Public Library	Drake Public Library	October 30, 1997 (#97001290)	115 Drake Ave. 40°43′55″N 92°52′20″W	Centerville	
6	Franklin Regular Baptist Church		February 20, 2008 (#08000087)	135th Ave. and 590th St. 40°37′20″N 93°01′58″W	Seymour	
7	Porter Hall	Porter Hall	January 24, 1980 (#80001429)	706 Drake Ave. 40°43′41″N 92°52′23″W	Centerville	
8	Second Baptist Church	Second Baptist Church	October 14, 1999 (#99001223)	422 S. 18th St. 40°43′47″N 92°52′05″W	Centerville	
9	Stratton House	Stratton House	September 9, 1975 (#75000677)	303 E. Washington St. 40°44′10″N 92°52′18″W	Centerville	
10	Sturdivant-Sawyer House	Sturdivant-Sawyer House	January 12, 1984 (#84001202)	707 Drake Ave. 40°43′41″N 92°52′20″W	Centerville	
11	U.S. Post Office	U.S. Post Office	November 7, 1978 (#78001204)	100 W. Maple St. 40°43′56″N 92°52′28″W	Centerville	
12	Vermilion Estate		April 26, 1978 (#78001205)	Valley Dr. 40°43′39″N 92°53′29″W	Centerville	
13	Wabash Combination Depot-Moravia	Wabash Combination Depot-Moravia	October 18, 1996 (#96001158)	W. North St. near its junction with Brandon St. 40°53′31″N 92°49′29″W	Moravia	

== See also ==
- List of National Historic Landmarks in Iowa
- National Register of Historic Places listings in Iowa
- Listings in neighboring counties: Davis, Lucas, Monroe, Putnam (MO), Schuyler (MO), Wapello, Wayne
