= Sawyer House =

Sawyer House (or Sawyer Homestead) may refer to the following locations on the National Register of Historic Places:

- Second C. A. Sawyer House, in Newton, Massachusetts
- Freeman-Brewer-Sawyer House, in Hillsboro, Illinois
- Louis Sawyer House, in Wyoming, Ohio
- Sawyer Farmhouse in Goshen, New York
- Sawyer Homestead (Sterling, Massachusetts)
- Sawyer House (Boxford, Massachusetts)
- Sawyer House (Monroe, Michigan)
- Sawyer-Wayside House, on the National Register of Historic Places listings in Lake County, Ohio
- Strickland-Sawyer House, on the National Register of Historic Places listings in Ellis County, Texas
- Sturdivant-Sawyer House, in Centerville, Iowa
- Watson-Sawyer House in Hamburg, Arkansas

== See also ==
- Sayer House (disambiguation)
