= Stratton House =

Stratton House may refer to:

In the United Kingdom

- Stratton House, London an office building in London
- Stratton Park, a country house at East Stratton, Hampshire

In the United States

- Smith-Joseph-Stratton House, Montgomery, Alabama, listed on the National Register of Historic Places in Montgomery County, Alabama
- Stratton House (Centerville, Iowa), listed on the National Register of Historic Places in Appanoose County, Iowa
- Stratton (Centreville, Maryland)
- Edward B. Stratton House, Newton, Massachusetts
- Bullen-Stratton-Cozzen House, Sherborn, Massachusetts
- William B. and Mary Chase Stratton House, Grosse Pointe Park, Michigan, listed on the National Register of Historic Places in Wayne County, Michigan
- Gov. Charles C. Stratton House, Woolwich Township, New Jersey, listed on the National Register of Historic Places in Gloucester County, New Jersey
- Walter Stratton House, Roxbury, New York
- Patterson–Stratton House, Eugene, Oregon, listed on the National Register of Historic Places in Lane County, Oregon
- Stratton–Cornelius House, Portland, Oregon
- C.C. Stratton House, Salem, Oregon, listed on the National Register of Historic Places in Marion County, Oregon
