= John Bushemi (politician) =

American politician from Indiana

John P. Bushemi

Member of the Indiana State Senate
- In office 1976–1990

Personal details
- Born: April 13, 1948 (age 78) Chicago, Illinois, U.S.
- Party: Democratic
- Education: Indiana University; Indiana University School of Law – Bloomington
- Occupation: lawyer

John Peter Bushemi (born April 13, 1948) is an American former politician from the state of Indiana. A Democrat, he served in the Indiana State Senate from 1976 to 1990. He is a lawyer.

Bushemi was born 13 April 1948 in Chicago, Illinois, the son of Samuel Joseph Bushemi. He is a nephew of Marion J. Bushemi and John A. Bushemi, and cousin of Victoria Caesar. Bushemi attended Indiana University Bloomington. He married Betty Ann Tiller on 26 September 1985.
