= Centerville Municipal Airport =

Centerville Municipal Airport may refer to:

- Centerville Municipal Airport (Iowa) in Centerville, Iowa, United States (FAA: TVK)
- Centerville Municipal Airport (Tennessee) in Centerville, Tennessee, United States (FAA/IATA: GHM)
