= KMGO =

- Centerville, Iowa; United States
- Broadcast area: Central Iowa
- Frequency: 98.7 MHz
- Branding: "Iowa Country"

Programming
- Format: Country
- Affiliations: AccuWeather; Fox News Radio

Ownership
- Owner: Edwin Brand; (Honey Creek Broadcasting, LLC)

History
- First air date: October 11, 1974

Technical information
- Licensing authority: FCC
- Facility ID: 35126
- Class: C1
- ERP: 100,000 watts
- HAAT: 137 meters (449 ft)
- Transmitter coordinates: 40°53′23″N 93°01′30″W

Links
- Public license information: Public file; LMS
- Webcast: Listen
- Website: kmgo.com

KMGO (98.7 MHz) is a radio station licensed to serve Centerville, Iowa, United States.

KMGO broadcasts a locally programmed new country format and is an affiliate for AccuWeather and Fox News Radio. The station is owned by Edwin Brand (Honey Creek Broadcasting, LLC).
