= Sayer House =

Sayer House may refer to:

- Villa Sayer, a residence at Haras de la Huderie in Glanville, Calvados, France
- Sayer House (Harris, Minnesota), listed on the NRHP in Chisago County, Minnesota, U.S.
- Mary Van Duzer-Sayer House, Cornwall, New York, NRHP-listed, in Orange County, New York, U.S.
- Hall-Sayers-Perkins House, Bastrop, Texas, listed on the NRHP in Bastrop County, Texas, U.S.
- Lemley-Wood-Sayer House, Ravenswood, West Virginia, NRHP-listed in Jackson County, West Virginia, U.S., U.S.
