= Andrew W. Tibbets =

American civil war soldier (c. 1830–1898)

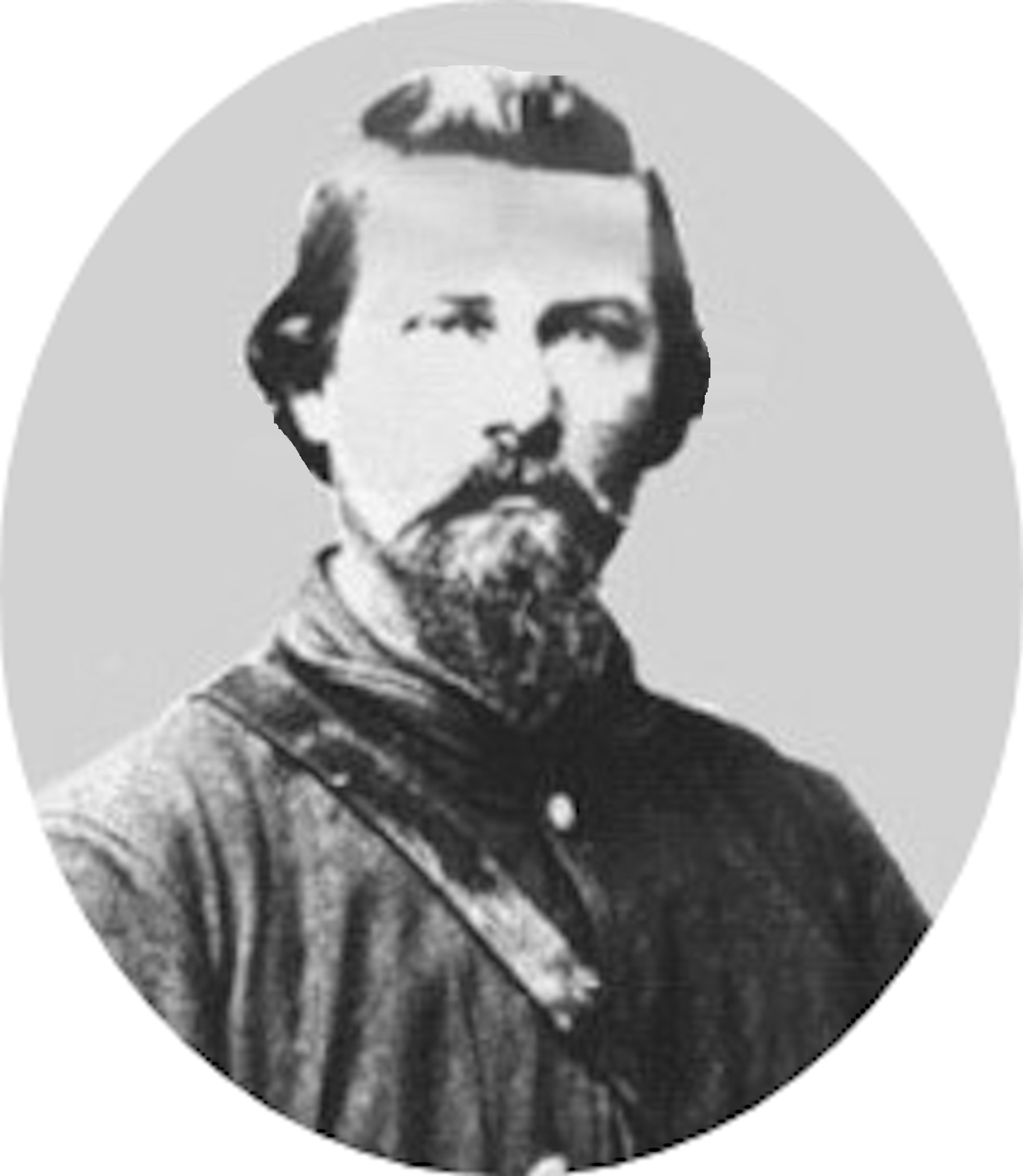
- Born: c. 1830; Clark County, Indiana
- Died: May 18, 1898
- Burial place: Allerton, Iowa
- Military career
- Allegiance: United States of America
- Branch: United States Army
- Rank: Private
- Units: Company I, 3rd Iowa Cavalry
- Conflicts: American Civil War
- Awards: Medal of Honor

Andrew W. Tibbets (c. 1830 – May 18, 1898) was an American soldier who fought in the American Civil War. Tibbets received his country's highest award for bravery during combat, the Medal of Honor. Tibbets medal was won for capturing the flag of the Confederate troop of Austin's Battery at Columbus, Georgia on April 16, 1865. He was honored with the award on June 17, 1865.

Tibetts was born in Clark County, Indiana, and entered service in Centerville, Iowa, and was buried in Allerton, Iowa.

== Medal of Honor citation ==
The President of the United States of America, in the name of Congress, takes pleasure in presenting the Medal of Honor to Private Andrew W. Tibbets, United States Army, for extraordinary heroism on 16 April 1865, while serving with Company I, 3d Iowa Cavalry, in action at Columbus, Georgia, for capture of flag and bearer, Austin's Battery (Confederate States of America).

== See also ==
- List of American Civil War Medal of Honor recipients: T–Z
