= Porter Hall (Centerville, Iowa) =

Historic house in Iowa, United States

- U.S. National Register of Historic Places
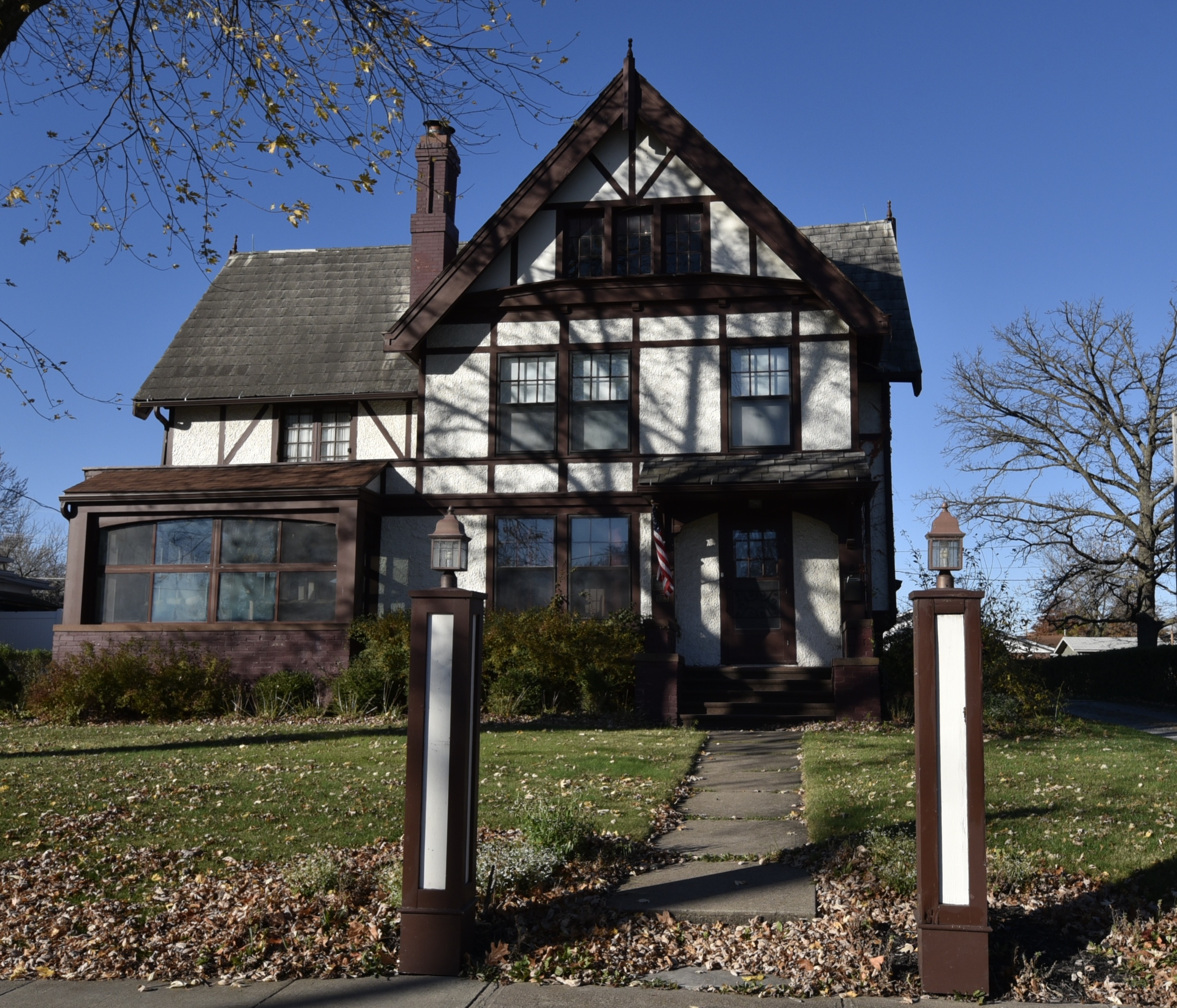

- Location within Iowa Location within the United States
- Location: 706 Drake Ave. Centerville, Iowa
- Coordinates: 40°43′41″N 92°52′23″W
- Area: less than one acre
- Architectural style: Picturesque Tudor Revival
- NRHP reference No.: 80001429
- Added to NRHP: January 24, 1980

Porter Hall is a historic residence located in Centerville, Iowa, United States. The 2½-story frame house exhibits aspects of the Picturesque Tudor Revival style, especially in the half-timbering and stucco. The house gained its present appearance during the ownership of Dr. Charles James in the 1910s and 1920s. There is some question as to whether this is an older 1880s house that has been extensively remodeled. It receives its name from Claude R. Porter who owned this property from 1906 to 1909. Porter was a Democrat, who served two terms in the Iowa House of Representatives, two terms in the Iowa Senate, United States Attorney for the Southern District of Iowa, and a member of the Interstate Commerce Commission. He was also a perennial candidate for Governor of Iowa and the U.S. Senate from Iowa, but lost every election to his Republican opponent. The house was listed on the National Register of Historic Places in 1980.
