= KCOG =

- Centerville, Iowa; United States
- Broadcast area: Appanoose County, Iowa
- Frequency: 1400 kHz
- Branding: 103.9 KCOG The Legend

Programming
- Format: Classic hits

Ownership
- Owner: Iowa Media Network

History
- First air date: February 27, 1949
- Call sign meaning: Keep Calling On God

Technical information
- Licensing authority: FCC
- Facility ID: 33736
- Class: C
- Power: 420 watts (day); 840 watts (night)
- Transmitter coordinates: 40°44′47″N 92°54′18.7″W
- Translator: 103.9 K280GY (Centerville)

Links
- Public license information: Public file; LMS
- Webcast: Listen live
- Website: iowamedianetwork.com

KCOG (1400 AM) is a radio station broadcasting a syndicated Classic Hits format. The station is licensed to serve the community of Centerville, Iowa, United States. The station is owned by Iowa Media Network.

== Translator ==
KCOG programming is also carried on a broadcast translator station to extend or improve the coverage area of the station.

Broadcast translator for KCOG
Call sign	Frequency	City of license	FID	ERP (W)	HAAT	Class	FCC info
K280GY	103.9 FM	Centerville, Iowa	148610	250	149 m (489 ft)	D	LMS
