= Simon Estes =

American opera singer

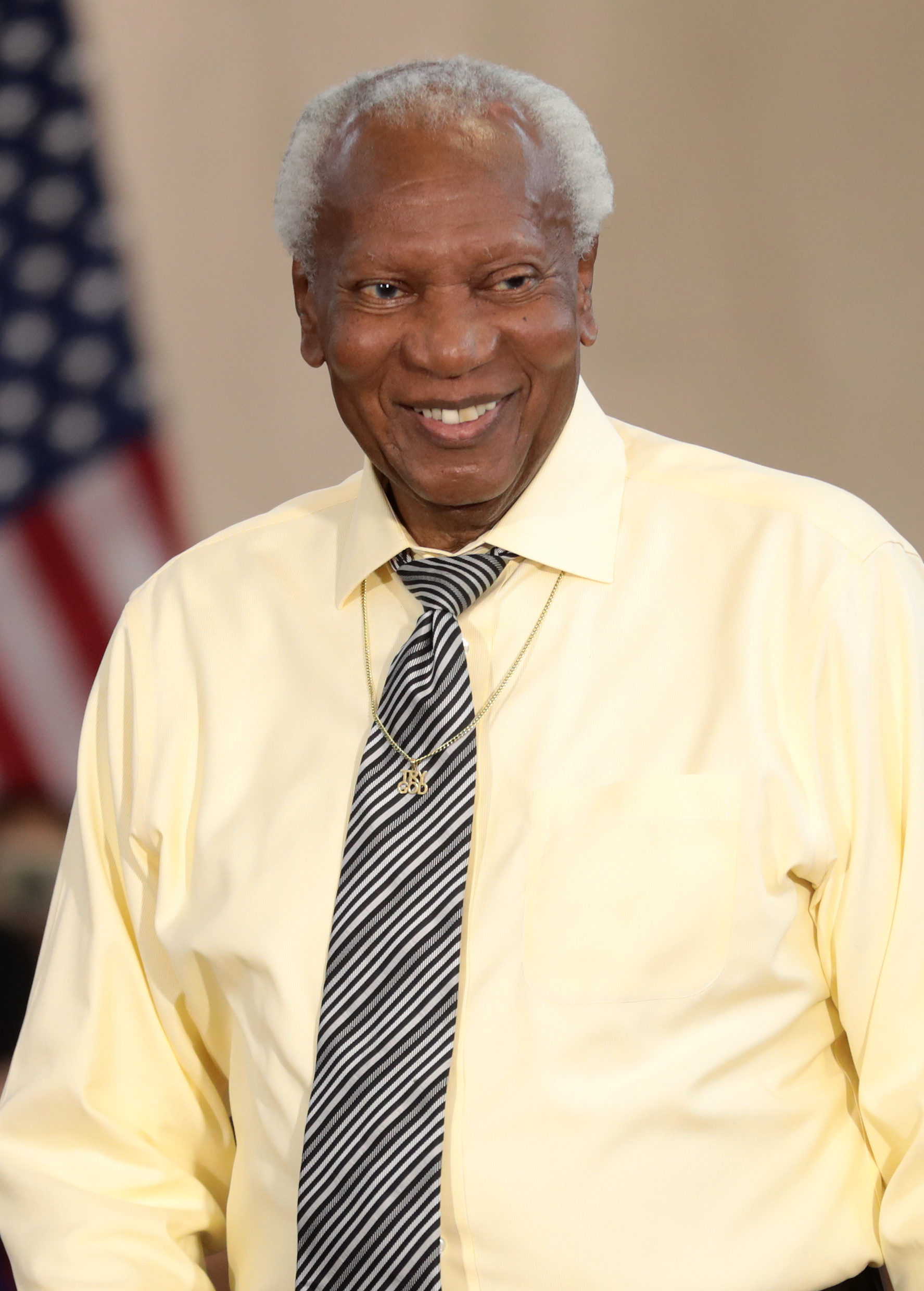
Estes performing in August 2019.

Simon Estes (born March 2, 1938) is an operatic bass-baritone of African-American descent who had a major international opera career beginning in the 1960s. He has sung at most of the world's major opera houses as well as in front of presidents, popes and internationally renowned figures and celebrities including Bill Clinton, Richard Nixon, Boris Yeltsin, Yasser Arafat, Nelson Mandela and Desmond Tutu. Notably, he was part of the first generation of black opera singers to achieve widespread success and is viewed as part of a group of performers who were instrumental in helping to break down the barriers of racial prejudice in the opera world.

== Early life and education ==
Estes was born in Centerville, Iowa, the son of Ruth Jeter Estes and Simon Estes. His father was a coal-miner and his grandfather was a former slave who had been sold at auction for $500. Named for his father, Estes was called 'Billy' within his family circle to avoid confusion when addressing the two. One of five children, Estes has three sisters and a younger brother. His family was heavily involved in their local Baptist church, and his earliest musical experiences were had there. He remained active with church musical activities and participated in school music programs throughout his youth.

In 1957 Estes entered the University of Iowa, originally with the intent of studying pre-med. He changed his major to psychology and then religion before finally deciding to switch to vocal music through the influence of faculty member Charles Kellis. At the time Estes had been singing in the university's "Old Gold Singers" (he was notably the group's first black singer) and his voice had grabbed Kellis's interest. Kellis became Estes's first voice teacher and it was he who introduced Estes to opera. After finishing his undergraduate studies, Estes pursued further education at the Juilliard School in 1964, a pursuit which was made possible through funds raised in Iowa.

== Career ==
Like many African-American artists of his day, Estes decided to go to Europe where racial prejudice was not as much of a barrier as it was in the United States. In 1965 he made his professional opera debut as Ramfis in Giuseppe Verdi's Aida at the Deutsche Oper Berlin to a warm reception. The following year he scored a major success when he won a bronze medal at Moscow's Tchaikovsky Competition. The competition win led to an invitation from President Lyndon Johnson to perform at the White House in 1966 and several offers for engagements at major opera houses in Europe soon followed.

Estes kept a very busy schedule performing in European opera houses during the late 1960s and the 1970s. He drew particular acclaim for performing leading roles in operas by Richard Wagner. He appeared at such houses as La Scala, Covent Garden, the Opéra National de Paris, the Liceu, the Hamburg State Opera, the Bavarian State Opera, the Vienna State Opera and the Zurich Opera among others. He also sang at several notable music festivals, including the Salzburg Festival and on Continental tours by the Glyndebourne Festival. In 1978 he notably became the first black male, African-American or otherwise, to sing a leading role at the prestigious Bayreuth Festival when he sang the lead role in Wagner's Der fliegende Holländer. The performance was a personal triumph for him and he went on to sing at Bayreuth for the next six consecutive years. He returned to Bayreuth again in 1985 to sing the Dutchman again; a performance that was captured on video and is still considered one of the best recordings of that role.

While Estes's career was thriving in the best European houses, he continued to be spurned by many of the major American houses during the 1970s. His debut with the Lyric Opera of Chicago in 1971 was in the minor role of the Ghost of Nino in Semiramide, and his successive roles at that house were not any bigger. The Metropolitan Opera did not even attempt to engage him in the 1960s; in 1976 he sang a single tour performance of Bellini's Norma with the Met at Wolf Trap. More favorable to him was the San Francisco Opera (SFO) with whom he sang several good roles in 1967, including the 4 villains in The Tales of Hoffmann and Carter Jones in the United States premiere of Gunther Schuller's The Visitation. He returned to the SFO several times during his career, singing Ramfis in Giuseppe Verdi's Aida (1972), Don Pedro in L'Africaine (1972), Raimondo in Lucia di Lammermoor (1972), the Dutchman in The Flying Dutchman (1979), Marke in Wagner's Tristan und Isolde (1980), Amonasro in Aida (1981), and Escamillo in Georges Bizet's Carmen (1981).

In 1981 Estes was finally offered a contract to sing at the home theatre of the Metropolitan Opera in New York City. He accepted, but at the time was cautioned by Leontyne Price, the first African-American to become a leading prima donna at the Met, about the difficult road ahead. Price, who suffered actual threats to her life when she first opened at the Met, explained, "Simon, it's going to be even more difficult for you. Because you are a black male, the discrimination will be greater. You have a beautiful voice; you are musical, intelligent, independent and handsome. With all of these ingredients, you are a threat. It will be more difficult for you than it was for me." However, the Met audience and critics responded favourably to Simon's house debut on January 4, 1982, as Hermann in Wagner's Tannhäuser with Richard Cassilly in the title role and Leonie Rysanek as Elisabeth.

Estes went on to sing in the next six consecutive seasons at the Met, portraying such roles as Amfortas in Wagner's Parsifal and Orest in Richard Strauss's Elektra. In 1985, he sang Porgy in the Met's first production of Gershwin's Porgy and Bess. In 1986, he sang Wotan in the inauguration of the legendary Ring production at the Metropolitan Opera directed by Otto Schenk. He returned to the Met in 1990 to sing Porgy again and for the last time in 1999 to portray Amonasro to Sharon Sweet's Aida. Perhaps his greatest Met moment was singing the role of Amonasro to Price's Aida for her farewell opera performance which was telecast live on national television on January 3, 1985.

== Humanitarian work ==
More recently, Estes has turned his attention to the fight against HIV/AIDS. At the forefront of Artists for HIV/AIDS prevention and education, Estes leads a collective voice of artists, who through music and arts, seek to break down socio-economic barriers as well as the stigma associated with the disease.

On July 9, 2010, he performed at the World Cup during the opening "Tribute to South Africa" at the FIFA Gala Concert in Johannesburg, South Africa. There he learned about the increasing problem of malaria in South Africa and decided also to get engaged in the fight against this illness.

In 2013, the Simon Estes Foundation inaugurated a program called "Iowa Students Care," to engage Iowa students in the cause of eliminating malaria in Africa by raising funds to provide treated bed nets for African children. Its "Eliminate Malaria Campaign" was engaged in partnership with the United Nations Foundation and its Nothing But Nets Campaign, and was endorsed the governor and lieutenant governor of the state of Iowa. Activities include selling a benefit CD called "Save the Children, Save their Lives", and an Iowa Students Care Christmas Concert to be held on December 15 in Ames, Iowa, which will also include the Des Moines Symphony led by Joseph Giunta.

In 2017, Estes donated a public performance for a nonprofit organization, the Foundation for the Revival of Classical Culture, at Carnegie Hall in a June 29, 2017 event entitled "Tribute to Sylvia Olden Lee." He played King Philip in scenes from the opera Don Carlos.

== Educator ==
Estes is currently a visiting professor of music at the Des Moines Area Community College (DMACC) Ankeny Campus. Before that, Estes was a professor of music at Wartburg College in Waverly, Iowa where he gives voice lessons when he is in residence. He has performed in Wartburg's Christmas concert, Christmas With Wartburg, and has been known to go on domestic and international spring tours with Wartburg's concert choir. He is listed on the artist faculty of Boston University and he is also the F. Wendell Miller Distinguished Artist in Residence at Iowa State University in Ames, Iowa. His many honorary degrees include a doctorate from Iowa State University, and he was named a Distinguished Alumnus of the University of Iowa.

== Personal life ==
In 1980, Estes married Yvonne Baer. They had three daughters, Jennifer, Lynne, and Tiffany. After 21 years, the couple divorced. Baer is now a consultant in Zurich. In 2001, Estes married Ovida Stong, a nurse who had cared for his mother in Iowa.

== Discography ==
- Haydn: Harmoniemesse / Leonard Bernstein
- Wagner Der fliegende Holländer / Bayreuth Festival, conducted Woldemar Nelsson (1985)
- Berlioz Roméo et Juliette / Philadelphia Orchestra / Riccardo Muti + Jessye Norman, John Aler (1986)
- Bizet / Carmen / Orchestre National de France / Seiji Ozawa + Jessye Norman, Mirella Freni, Neil Shicoff (1989)
- Gershwin Porgy and Bess (excerpt) / Berlin Radio Symphony Orchestra / Slatkin + Roberta Alexander (1985)
- Spirituals
- Verdi Arias / Philharmonia / Deldu
- Stravinsky Oedipus Rex / Esa-Pekka Salonen + Vinson Cole
- Stravinsky Le chant du rossignol / Orchestre National de France / Pierre Boulez + Murray, Rolfe-Johnson
- Mozart Requiem / Philharmonia / Carlo Maria Giulini + Dawson, Van Ness, Lewis
- Saint-Saëns Samson et Delilah / ROH / Sir Colin Davis + Carreras, Baltsa
- Handel Messiah / Bavarian Symphony Orchestra / Sir Colin Davis + Margaret Price, Schwartz, Burrows
- Handel Judas Maccabeaus
- Faure Requiem / Staatskapelle Dresden /Sir Colin Davis + Lucia Popp
- Beethoven Ninth Symphony / Carlo Maria Giulini
- Verdi Oberto / Teatro Communale Bologna / Zoltán Peskó + Cortez, Grilli, Gulin (1977)
- Verdi Don Carlos / ROH / Carlo Maria Giulini + Domingo, Caballé, Verrett, Milnes (1969)
- Verdi Requiem / Schuricht + Sweet, Araiza, Van Ness
- Verdi Requiem / Berlin Philharmonic/Carlo Maria Guilini + Sweet, Quivar, Cole
- De Falla Atlántida / Spanish National Orchestra / Colomer + Berganza, Bayo

== Selected awards and honors ==
- 1965 — Third Prize, ARD International Music Competition, Munich
- 1966 — Bronze Medal, International Tchaikovsky Competition, Moscow
- 1971 — National Academy of Recording Artists
- 1988 — United States Constitution Bicentennial Medal
- 1996 — Iowa Award (Iowa's highest citizen honor, awarded every five years)
- 2004 — Licia Albanese-Puccini Foundation Award, New York
- 2012 — Gold Medal of Gran Teatre del Liceu in Barcelona, Spain
- 2021 — Robert D.Ray Iowa Character Counts Award. Centerville Iowa.
