= Jonathan Mathews =

American baseball coach

Jonathan Richard Mathews (born March 18, 1972) is an American professional baseball coach for the San Diego Padres of Major League Baseball.

Mathews is from Centerville, Iowa. The Colorado Rockies selected him in the 42nd round of the 1994 MLB draft. After his playing career, Mathews served as a coach at Indian Hills Community College in Centerville, and in the Baltimore Orioles and Arizona Diamondbacks systems. The Padres hired Mathews to their major league staff as their outfield coach before the 2017 season. After the season, the Padres reassigned him to a minor league coaching role, where he remains as of 2022.
