= Second Baptist Church (Centerville, Iowa) =

- U.S. National Register of Historic Places
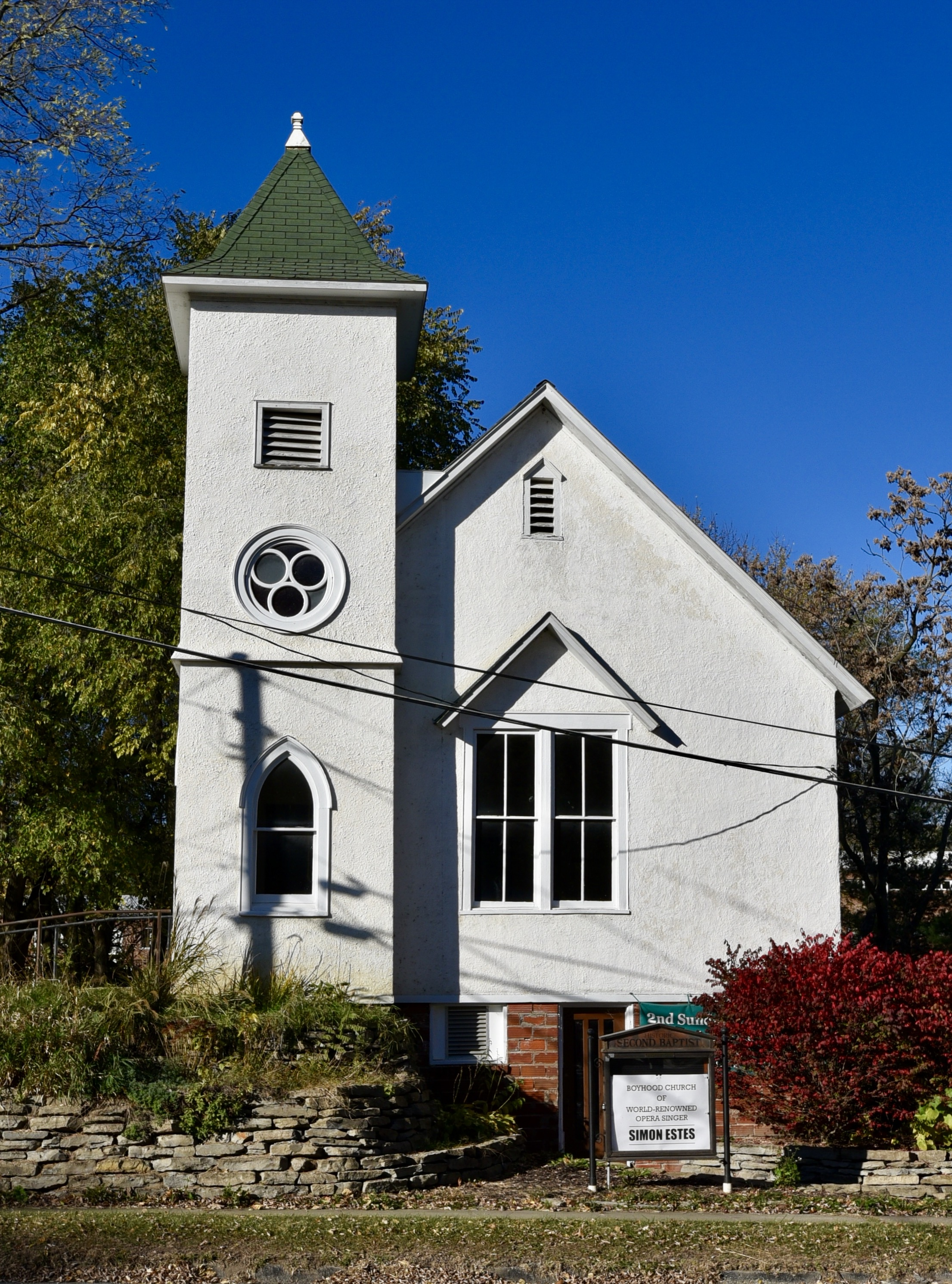

- Location within Iowa Location within the United States
- Location: 422 S. 18th St. Centerville, Iowa
- Coordinates: 40°43′47″N 92°52′4″W
- Area: less than one acre
- Built: 1902
- Architectural style: Late Gothic Revival
- MPS: Centerville MPS
- NRHP reference No.: 99001223
- Added to NRHP: October 14, 1999

Second Baptist Church is an historic church building located in Centerville, Iowa, United States. It was listed on the National Register of Historic Places in 1999.

== History ==
The congregation was organized in 1893 by African Americans. There were twelve people in the congregation when the church began. The congregation grew in size and by 1902 they desired their own church building. They began fundraising and the cornerstone for the structure was laid in June of that year. The wood-framed structure was designed in the Gothic Revival style.

Coal mining in the area began to decline in the 1920s and the congregation's membership peaked in the 1930s at 126 people. Opera singer Simon Estes sang in the church choir in the 1940s. The congregation continued to use the church until the early 1990s. The building then sat empty for a short time until efforts to preserve it began in 1996. The restoration project was completed in 2003 and it is now used for musical and other events.
