= Appanoose County Community Railroad =

Overview
- Headquarters: Centerville, Iowa
- Reporting mark: APNC
- Locale: Iowa
- Dates of operation: 1983–2016
- Successor: Iowa Southern Railway

Technical
- Track gauge: 4 ft 8 1/2 in (1,435 mm) standard gauge

The Appanoose County Community Railroad (reporting mark APNC) was based out of Centerville, Iowa. It was a shortline running to the community of Albia, Iowa, where it distributed cars from Centerville to be put on the BNSF Railway's trains.

The railroad ran its first train on December 18, 1984. The railroad was created via a grassroots effort by local residents and civic leaders of Centerville, eventually receiving federal and state funding. Tracks and diesel locomotives were purchased from the Burlington Northern Railroad and the bankrupt Rock Island Line.

The railroad was hit hard when the local Rubbermaid plant in Centerville (APNC's premier customer) closed its doors on September 15, 2006. At least 75% of the cargo hauled by the shortline was from Rubbermaid. The railroad was partly operated by the county. In 2016, a new railroad, the Iowa Southern Railway (ISRY), took over operations on the line. It is one of the short-line railroads operated by Progressive Rail Incorporated.

== Excursion trains ==
Every July, the APNC Railroad offered train rides from Moravia, Iowa. The train traveled from Moravia to Albia. Several different trains were operated each day, and one of the two GP7s pulled them.

The APNC railroad, now Iowa Southern, passes through four Iowa towns: Centerville, Udell, Moravia and Albia.
