= Vermilion Estate =

Historic house in Iowa, United States

- U.S. National Register of Historic Places
- Location within Iowa Location within the United States
- Location: Valley Dr. Centerville, Iowa
- Coordinates: 40°43′40″N 92°52′34″W
- Area: 26 acres (11 ha)
- Built: 1870
- Architect: C.A. Dunham
- Architectural style: Italianate
- NRHP reference No.: 78001205
- Added to NRHP: April 26, 1978

The Vermilion Estate is a historic building located in Centerville, Iowa, United States. W.F. Vermilion was a native of Kentucky who settled in Iowa after earning his medical degree from Rush Medical College in Chicago. He served as a captain in the Union Army during the Civil War. After the war he was admitted to the Iowa Bar, and served a term in the Iowa Senate as a Republican.

The Italianate style structure was designed for the Vermilions by Burlington, Iowa architect C.A. Dunham from the architectural firm of Dunham and Jordan. Completed in 1870, the two-story frame house rests on a stone foundation, has bracketed eaves, and is capped with a hipped roof. The house is part of a 26-acre (11 ha) estate just outside the western city limits of Centerville. It was originally a 40-acre (16 ha) estate, and Dr. Vermilion did rely on livestock or horses for part of his livelihood. Most of the acreage was used for grazing land, and the crops that were cultivated on it were for livestock feed. The gazebo, barn and granary were built on the estate during the Vermilion's ownership. The garage (c. 1910), playhouse (c. 1920), and chicken house (1942) were built later. The estate was listed on the National Register of Historic Places in 1978.
