= Sawyer House (Boxford, Massachusetts) =

Historic house in Massachusetts, United States

- U.S. National Register of Historic Places
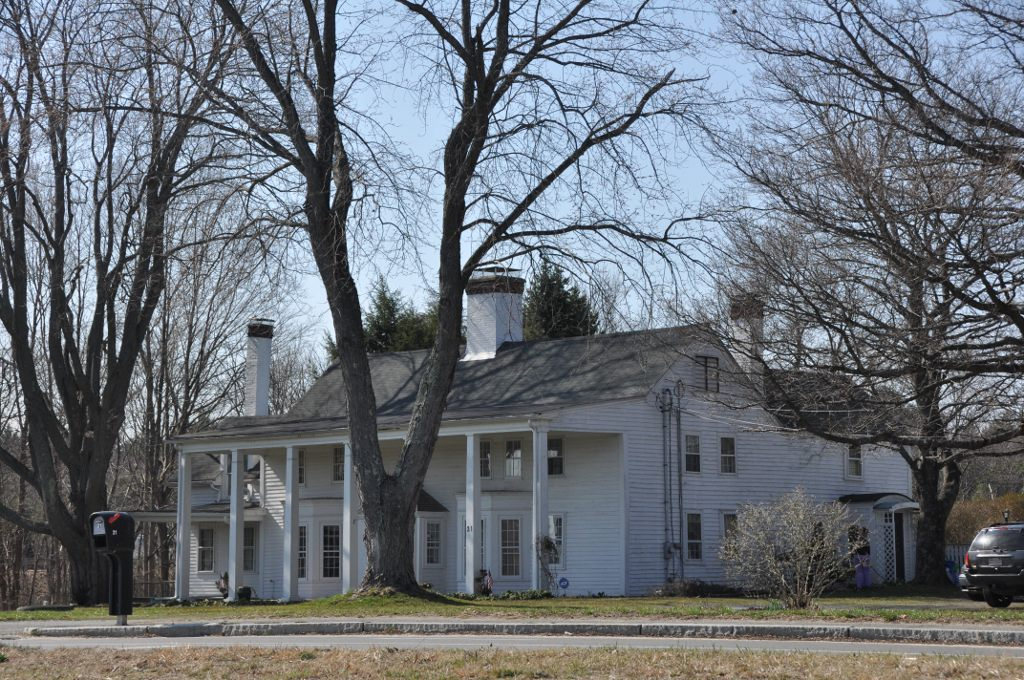

- Location within Massachusetts Location within the United States
- Location: 21 Endicott Road, Boxford, Massachusetts
- Coordinates: 42°37′41″N 70°58′39″W
- Architectural style: Colonial
- MPS: First Period Buildings of Eastern Massachusetts TR
- NRHP reference No.: 90000194
- Added to NRHP: March 9, 1990

The Sawyer House is a historic First Period house in Boxford, Massachusetts. It is a 2 1/2-story central-chimney house with an attached rear two-story wing. A two-story full-width portico supported by seven turned columns shelters the front of the house. Like many First Period houses, this one was built in stages, and exhibits a variety of architectural styles despite its early origins. The first portion to be built was the center chimney and the two-story section to its right, in c. 1700. Later in the First Period the rooms to the left of the chimney were added. The rear wing was added in the 19th century, as was the front portico. There two further additions in the 20th century, including a sun room at the rear where the 19th-century addition meets the main house, and single-story shed-roofed addition on the west gable end, running the full depth of the house.

The house was listed on the National Register of Historic Places in 1990.

== See also ==
- National Register of Historic Places listings in Essex County, Massachusetts
- List of the oldest buildings in Massachusetts
