= Appanoose County Sheriff's House and Jail =

Historic house in Iowa, United States

- U.S. National Register of Historic Places
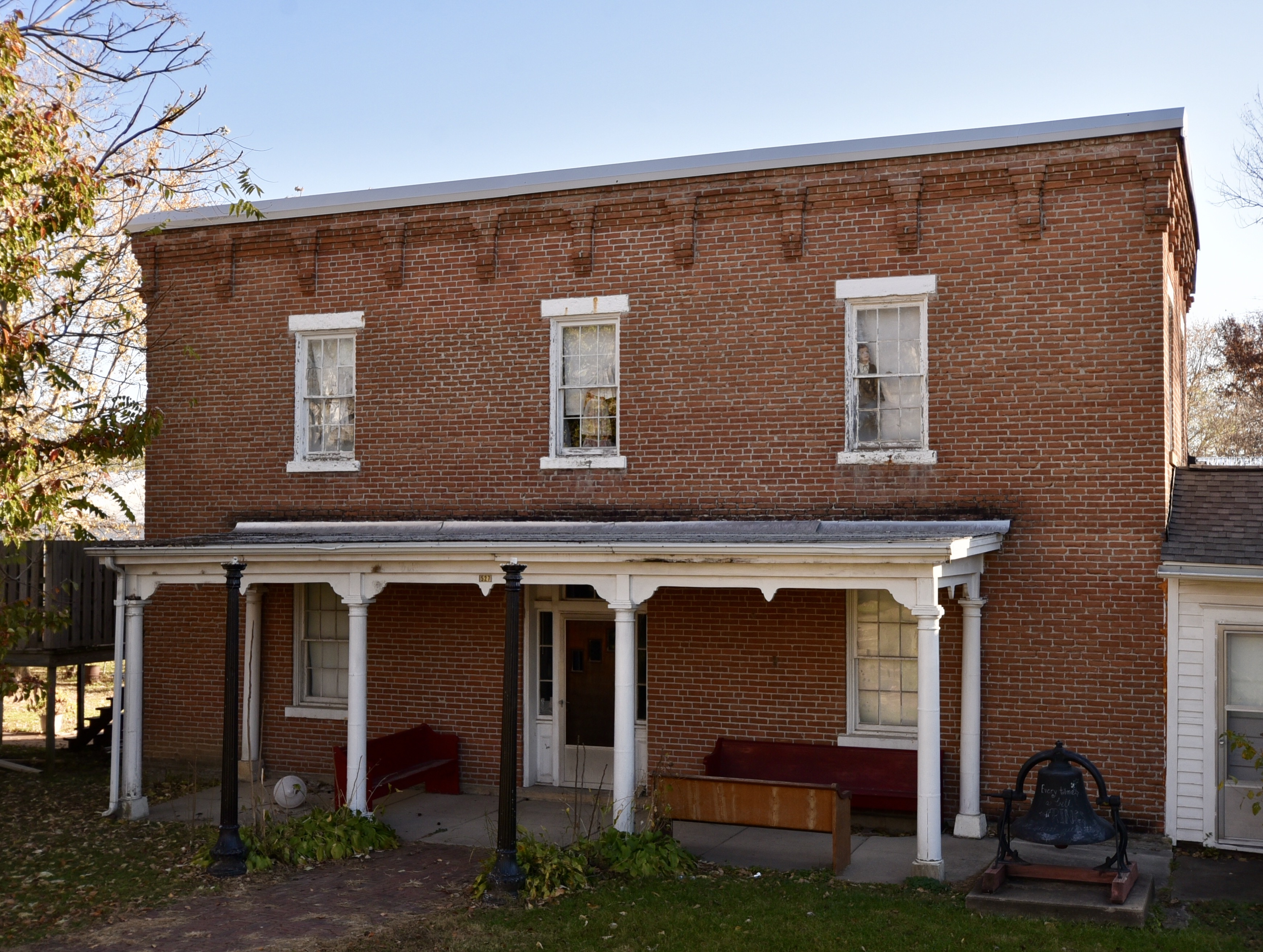

- Location within Iowa Location within the United States
- Location: 527 N. Main St. Centerville, Iowa
- Coordinates: 40°44′13″N 92°52′26″W
- Area: Less than one acre
- Built: 1872
- Built by: Jacob Shaw; Thomas Wentworth; Pauly Jail Building Co.
- Architectural style: Late Victorian
- MPS: Centerville MPS
- NRHP reference No.: 97001292
- Added to NRHP: October 30, 1997

The Appanoose County Sheriff's House and Jail is a historic structure located in Centerville, Iowa, United States. Provisions for a jail in Appanoose County were not realized until 1855 when a small stone building was constructed. It was used for about ten years when one of the inmates easily escaped.

The county sent its inmates to Wapello County until 1872 when this facility was completed. Jacob Shaw and Thomas Wentworth built the two-part facility. The front portion of the structure is a two-story brick structure that served as the sheriff's residence. The single-story stone jail facility was in the rear of the structure. A single story frame wing that served as a kitchen and pantry was added to the south end of the house around 1879. In 1904 the Pauly Jail Building Company of St. Louis designed and installed the steel and iron cells when the building was remodelled. There were four cells for men and two for juveniles or women. A frame addition was made to the jail around the same time. A shed roof was added around 1940 and connected this addition to the kitchen addition, and created a carport.

The facility is located on the east side of Main Street, one and one-half blocks north of Centerville's Courthouse Square. The grade of Main Street has been raised over the years and it is now necessary to descend a set of steps to reach the front yard and entrance of the building. The facility was used as the county's jail until the mid-1960s, and in 1973 the county Board of Supervisors gave the building to the Appanoose County Historical Society for use as a museum. It was placed on the National Register of Historic Places in 1997.
