= Franklin Regular Baptist Church =

- U.S. National Register of Historic Places
- Location within Iowa Location within the United States
- Location: 135th Ave. and 590th St.
- Nearest city: Seymour, Iowa
- Coordinates: 40°37′20″N 93°1′58″W
- Area: 3 acres (1.2 ha)
- Built: 1880-1881
- Architectural style: Late 19th And 20th Century Revivals
- NRHP reference No.: 08000087
- Added to NRHP: February 20, 2008

Franklin Regular Baptist Church, also known simply as Franklin Baptist Church, is a historic church building located southeast of Seymour in rural Appanoose County, Iowa, United States. The white frame church is associated with the no longer extant village of Livingston and its founder Livingston Parker. Parker was an Upstate New York native who relocated to Ohio before homesteading in Appanoose County in 1854. The Baptist Society was formed in Franklin Township on April 12, 1862, in the home of Peter Angle. Livingston Parker served as moderator for most of the community's Covenant Meetings before he was ordained and called as a circuit preacher for churches in Exline, Iowa, St. John, Missouri, and Livingston. The congregation in Livingston met in member homes until it was able to raise the money to complete the church building in 1881. The church originally faced a road, but the county built 135th Avenue behind the church in the 1950s. The congregation remained in existence until 1967. The church building began to deteriorate until 1999 when the local cemetery association began to look after it. It was added to the National Register of Historic Places in 2008.
