= United States Post Office (Centerville, Iowa) =

- U.S. Post Office
- U.S. National Register of Historic Places
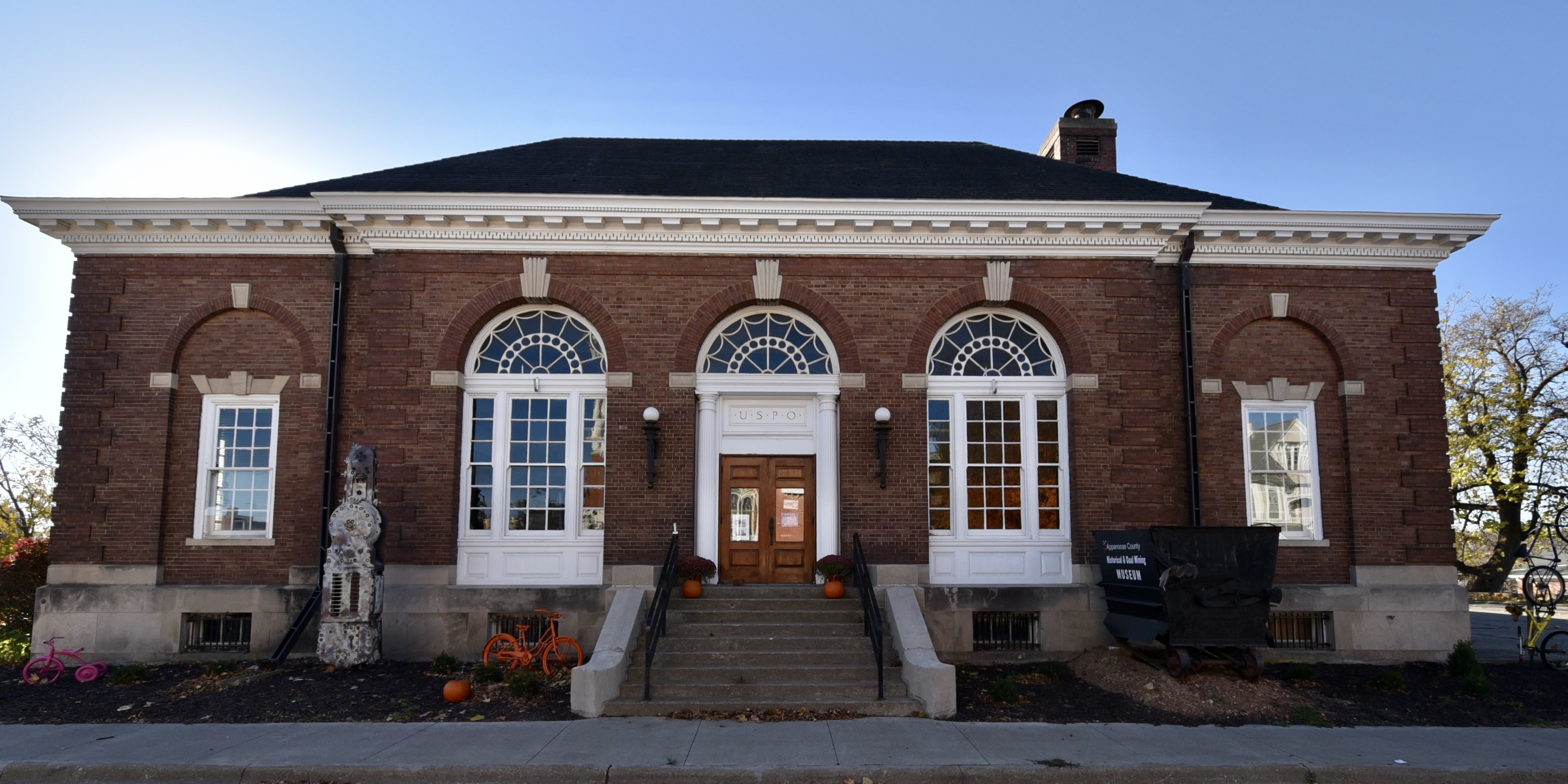

- Location within Iowa Location within the United States
- Location: 100 W. Maple St. Centerville, Iowa
- Coordinates: 40°43′56″N 92°52′28″W
- Area: less than one acre
- Built: 1904
- Architect: James Knox Taylor
- Architectural style: Georgian Revival
- NRHP reference No.: 78001204
- Added to NRHP: November 7, 1978

The former United States Post Office is a historic building located in Centerville, Iowa, United States. The Georgian Revival style structure was designed by the architectural section of the U.S. Treasury Department, which was under the supervision of James Knox Taylor at that time. Completed in 1904, the main block of the building is five bays wide, and three deep. It has quoined corners, and it is capped with a hipped roof with a wooden modillion cornice and a narrow, decorative frieze. The roof originally had a cupola in the center and a balustrade. An addition was built onto the west side of the building in 1932, and an enclosed loading dock was added in 1951. The post office moved into a new facility on North Tenth Street in 1977. The building was listed on the National Register of Historic Places in 1978. It was acquired in 1982 by the Appanoose County Historical Society for use as their museum.

== See also ==
- List of United States post offices
