= Sturdivant-Sawyer House =

Historic house in Iowa, United States

- U.S. National Register of Historic Places
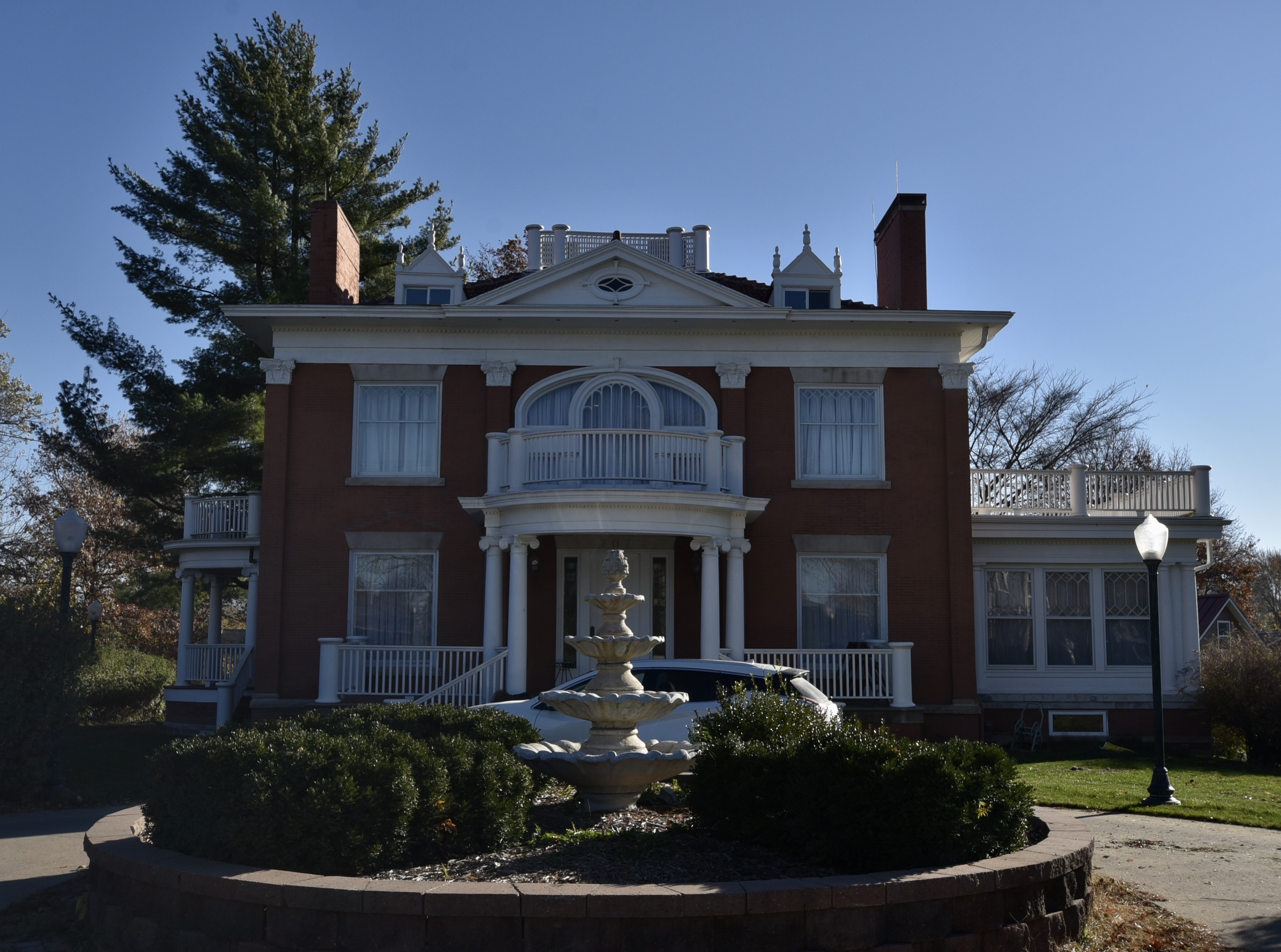

- Location within Iowa Location within the United States
- Location: 707 Drake Ave. Centerville, Iowa
- Coordinates: 40°43′41″N 92°52′20″W
- Area: 1.2 acres (0.49 ha)
- Built: 1902
- Architect: Charles Edward Eastman, Des Moines, Iowa
- Architectural style: Colonial Revival; Italian Villa
- NRHP reference No.: 84001202
- Added to NRHP: January 12, 1984

Sturdivant-Sawyer House is a historic residence located in Centerville, Iowa, United States. The house was built by Francis M. Drake, a former Governor of Iowa and founder of Drake University in Des Moines, as a wedding gift for his daughter Mary Drake Sturdivant. The Sturdivants owned house until 1908, and then again from 1914 to 1917. J. L. Sawyers, a Drake son-in-law, used the house as a medical clinic from 1908 to 1914 while he resided in the Drake House. Frank S. Payne bought the house in 1917. He was a local attorney who served two terms in the Iowa General Assembly, was president of Iowa Southern Utilities Company, and president of the Centerville National Bank. His wife, Grace, served in the leadership of various local women's organizations.

The house features Colonial Revival stylistic elements on a structure that follows an Italian Villa-type plan. Its most striking features are the two cyrtostyle porches with balconies above on the north and west elevations. The main facade on the west features a Palladian window above the porch. The basement-level garage was added sometime before 1924, and the sun porch above it was added in the mid-1950s. It was listed on the National Register of Historic Places in 1984.
