= Courthouse Square Historic District (Centerville, Iowa) =

Historic district in Iowa, United States

- U.S. National Register of Historic Places
- U.S. Historic district
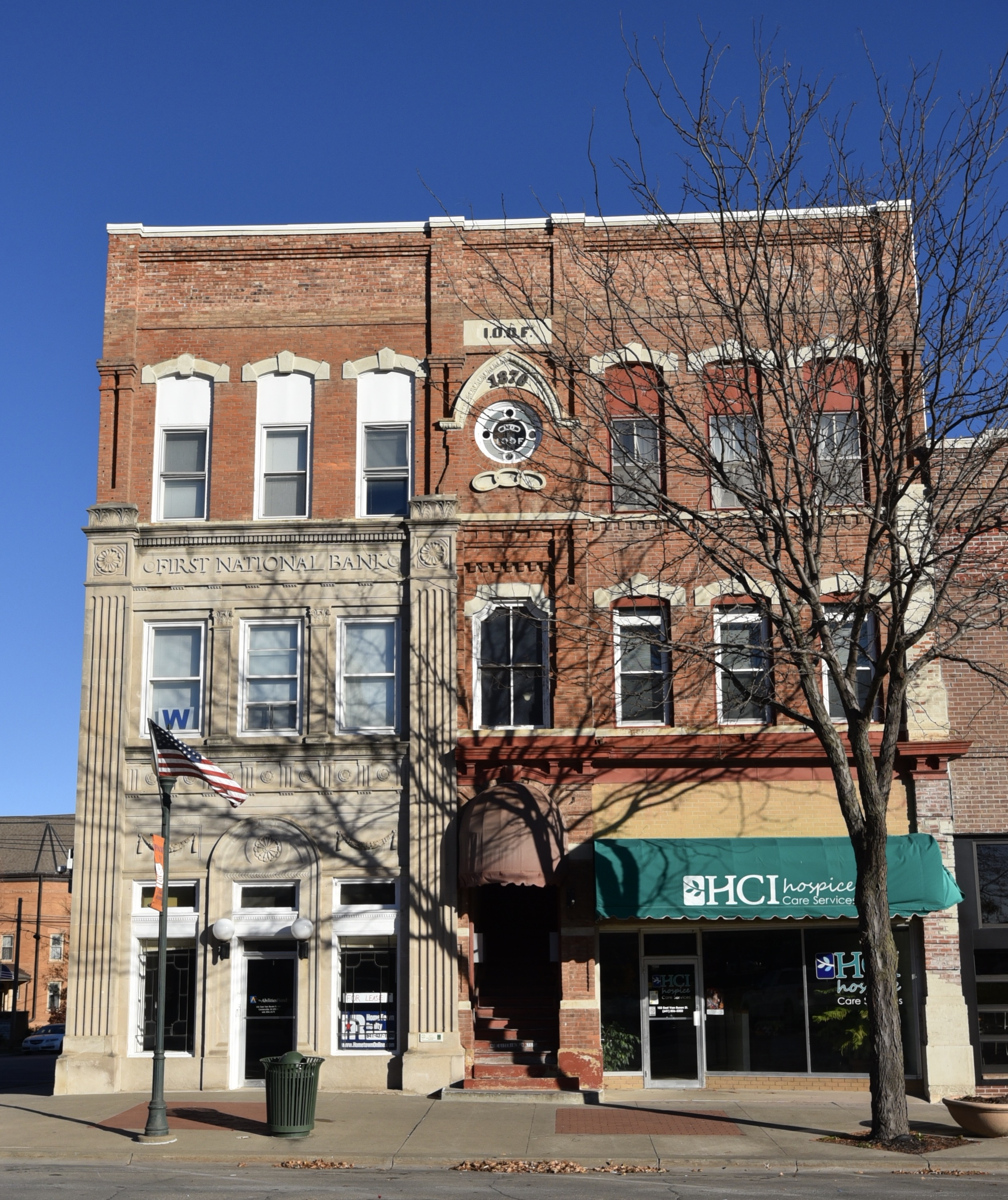

- Location within Iowa Location within the United States
- Interactive map showing the location of Courthouse Square Historic District
- Location: Centerville, Iowa
- Coordinates: 40.7343°N 92.8743°W
- Built: 1876
- Architect: Dunham, Charles A.; Smith & Gage
- Architectural style: Gothic, Queen Anne, Romanesque
- MPS: Centerville MPS
- NRHP reference No.: 97001291
- Added to NRHP: October 30, 1997

The Courthouse Square Historic District in Centerville, Iowa, was placed on the National Register of Historic Places in 1997 through the efforts of the Centerville Historic Preservation Commission. The district consists of an area centered on the town square and bounded by Van Buren Street, Haynes Avenue, Maple Street and 10th Street. The Appanoose County Courthouse is located in the center of the Courthouse Square District.
