= John Bushemi =

John A. Bushemi
- Born: April 19, 1917; Centerville, Iowa
- Died: February 19, 1944 (aged 26); Eniwetok, central Pacific
- Cause of death: Killed in action
- Resting place: Mount Mercy Cemetery, Gary, Indiana
- Citizenship: U.S.
- Occupation: photojournalist
- Years active: 1936–1944
- Employer(s): Gary Post-Tribune and the U.S. government
- Known for: World War II combat photography in Yank magazine
- Parent(s): Pietro Buscemi and Angelina Cariota Buscemi
- Awards: Bronze Star and a Purple Heart for U.S. military service

John A. Bushemi (April 19, 1917 – February 19, 1944) was an American, best known for his service as a World War II combat photographer and filmmaker for the U.S. Army. Bushemi, the son of Sicilian immigrants, was born in Centerville, Iowa, and grew up in Taylorville, Illinois, and Gary, Indiana. He joined the Gary Post-Tribune in 1936 as an apprentice photographer and became known for his sports photography. While working at the Post-Tribune he earned the nickname of "One Shot" for his abilities to capture moments on film with one click of his camera shutter. Bushemi enlisted in the army in June 1941. After taking basic training at Fort Bragg, North Carolina, he remained there as a staff photographer in its public relations office. In June 1942 Bushemi was reassigned as a staff photographer to Yank, a weekly magazine for enlisted men, and was based in its editorial office in New York City. In November 1942 Bushemi was transferred to Hawaii, where he and Yank correspondent Merle Miller opened its Pacific bureau.

Bushemi covered the Pacific Theater of Operations for Yank, including the fighting in New Georgia, Munda, Solomon Islands, Makin, Tarawa, and Kwajalein, and was killed in action at Eniwetok in the central Pacific in 1944. Bushemi received a posthumous Bronze Star and a Purple Heart for his military service. Bushemi's photographs have appeared in Yank, the Saturday Evening Post, the New York Times Magazine, the Gary Post-Tribune, the Field Artillery Journal, and in museum and library exhibitions. Among other awards for his photography, Bushemi was inducted into the Indiana Journalism Hall of Fame in 2001.

== Early life ==
Bushemi was born in Centerville, Iowa, on April 19, 1917. He was the son of Italian immigrants, the seventh of nine children (six boys and three girls). John's father, Pietro Buscemi, was a native of Calascibetta, Sicily, who immigrated to the United States in 1906, while John's mother, Angelina Cariota, arrived in 1909 with Pietro and Angelina's eldest son, Mario (later called Marion J. Bushemi), and a daughter, Vincenzina (later called Margaret V. Polizzotto). Pietro worked in coal mining in Iowa. In 1925 the family moved to Taylorville, Illinois, where Pietro worked for the Peabody Coal Company. The family surname was Americanized to Bushemi in the early 1930s. In May 1930, the family relocated to Gary, Indiana, where Pietro found employment at U.S. Steel.

As a teen John participated in Golden Gloves boxing tournaments and earned spending money during the Great Depression giving haircuts in the basement of his family's home. Bushemi attended Gary's Lew Wallace High School, but quit school during his junior year to work in the steel mills with his father and brothers. Intending to become a professional photographer, Bushemi used wages from his steel industry job to purchase his first camera. He developed the film in a darkroom set up in the family's home in Gary.

== Career ==
=== News photographer ===
On June 24, 1936, at age nineteen, Bushemi was hired by the Gary Post-Tribune as an apprentice photographer and was best known for his action shots of sporting events. Bushemi's snapshots of sports, breaking news, and crime scenes earned him the nickname of "One Shot" because of his ability to capture significant moments on film with one click of his camera's shutter. Bushemi's sports photos won awards in contests sponsored by the Indiana Associated Press and the Inland Daily Press Association, but he could also capture quieter settings and nature scenes. Bushemi joined U.S. Army in 1941 and became the inspiration for the Post-Tribune's "Dear Johnny" newsletter, which summarized happenings at home for soldiers who were stationed overseas.

In July 1941 Bushemi was inducted into the U.S. Army at Fort Benjamin Harrison in Indianapolis, Indiana, and took basic training at Fort Bragg, North Carolina. He was appointed to Fort Bragg's public relations office as a staff photographer, where his fellow staff member and close friend was Marion Hargrove, author of See Here, Private Hargrove (1942), a bestseller made into a subsequent movie about Hargrove's experiences in the military. Bushemi was included as a principal character in Hargrove's book. Bushemi's publicity photo of Hargrove appeared on the book's back cover.

=== Combat photographer ===
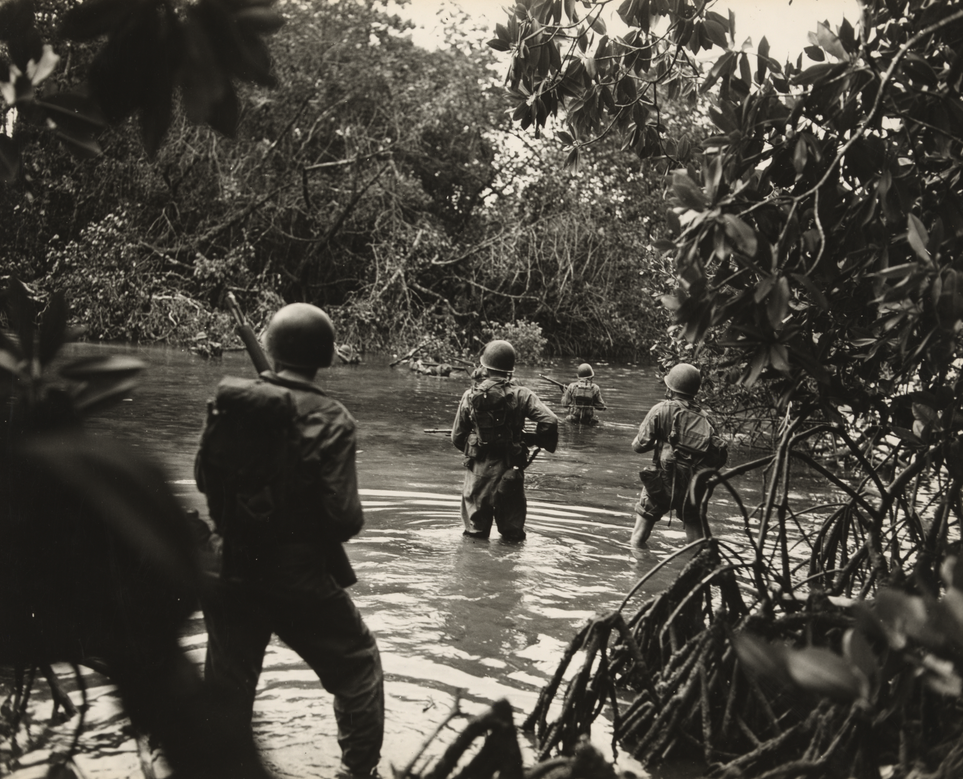
Operations Against the Japanese on Arundel and Sagekarsa Islands by John Bushemi, 1943.

In June 1942 Bushemi was assigned as a staff photographer to Yank, a new weekly magazine for the army's enlisted men. Bushemi was first assigned to the Yank editorial offices in New York City. While based in New York City, Bushemi shot photographs to illustrate articles on subjects such as women working at the Aberdeen Proving Ground, desert warfare training in California, the World Series, and Hollywood actresses.

In November 1942 Bushemi and staff writer Merle Miller were transferred to Hawaii to open Yank's Pacific bureau. While stationed at Waikiki, Bushemi learned the techniques of filmmaking from Colonel Frank Capra, the former Hollywood director. In addition to taking still photographs, Bushemi shot several movies while covering the Pacific War. Bushemi cut and edited the films himself, adding "A One Shot Production" to the beginning of each one. From Yank's base in Hawaii, Bushemi traveled on assignment to New Caledonia, the Fiji Islands, and Australia. Bushemi’s photographs were part of the exhibition "Yank Illustrates the War" held at the Museum of Modern Art in the spring of 1943. Several Bushemi photographs have appeared on the covers of Yank.

In August 1943 Bushemi covered his first combat assignment in New Georgia in the Solomon Islands with Yank correspondent Mack Morriss. Bushemi's photographs were published with Morriss's feature stories in the October 15, November 19, and November 26, 1943, issues of Yank. Bushemi's next combat assignment, in November 1943, was at Makin and Tarawa in the Gilbert Islands, where he was the only photographer to cover both invasions. Bushemi's article, "Death Battle at Tarawa", appeared in the December 24, 1943, issue of Yank, after editorial revisions were made in the New York office. Bushemi's photographs at Tarawa didn’t turn out well and were not published; however, Yank made extensive use of his photographs from Makin, including a cover photo and in accompanying articles in the December 31, 1943, issue. For his work Bushemi used a Bell and Howell movie camera, a Rolleiflex, and a handheld Speed Graphic, which he often used for combat photos. In January 1944 Bushemi and Miller covered combat during Operation Flintlock at Kwajalein atoll in the Marshall Islands. Bushemi's Marshall Islands photographs, among his last, appeared in the March 10, 1944, issue of Yank with Miller's article, "After the Battle of Kwajalein". While boarding a landing craft after the battle, Bushemi broke a finger in his left hand, but refused to return to Honolulu as he anticipated his next combat assignment. Bushemi was covering his fifth battle assignment for Yank when he was killed in action on February 19, 1944. Bushemi and Miller had landed on Eniwetok atoll, 350 miles northwest of Kwajalein in the central Pacific, when Bushemi, who was at the front filming and photographing the American landing, was fatally wounded.

== Death and legacy ==
On February 19, 1944, shrapnel from 60mm enemy mortar shells exploded near a group of journalists and photographers covering the American landing on Eniwetok atoll in the central Pacific. Bushemi was critically wounded in the head, neck, and leg. After combat medics treated Bushemi on Eniwetok, he was transported to the USS Neville, where he died later that day. His last words to Merle Miller, one of the Yank correspondents who covered the Pacific War and was with Bushemi at Eniwetok, were: "Be sure to get those pictures back to the office." Bushemi's military rank at the time of his death was staff sergeant (technician 3rd grade). He was the second of four Yank staff photographers killed during the war.

On February 22 a memorial service was held aboard the Neville for Bushemi and Lieutenant Kermit Chapman, who was also killed in the fighting at Eniwetok. A telegram notified Bushemi's family of his death on February 29 and a memorial service was held in Gary, Indiana, on March 3, 1944. Bushemi's body was among the 3,000 American servicemen's bodies returned to the U.S. mainland in October 1947. On November 5, 1947, a high requiem mass was held at Saint Mark Church in Gary. Bushemi is buried in Mount Mercy Cemetery in Gary, Indiana.

== Works ==
- "An American Soldier" cover photo, Field Artillery Journal, January 1942 issue.
- Cover photo, Yank, May 30, 1943, issue, British edition
- Cover photo, Yank, October 17, 1943, British edition
- Cover photo, Yank, November 28, 1943, British edition
- Cover photo, Yank, March 31, 1944, issue
- Feature story photos for "Story of an Infantry Battle in New Georgia" by Mack Morriss, Yank, October 15, 1943, issue
- Feature story photos for "The Five-Day Attack on Hastings Ridge" by Mack Morriss, Yank, November 19, 1943, issue
- Feature story photos for "Jungle Mop-Up" by Mack Morriss, Yank, November 26, 1943, issue
- Feature story photos for "After the Battle of Kwajalein" by Merle Miller, Yank, March 10, 1944, issue
- "Death Battle at Tarawa", written by Bushemi, with revisions from Yank editors in New York, December 24, 1943, issue.
- Bushemi photographs have appeared in the Saturday Evening Post, the New York Times Magazine, and the Gary Post-Tribune.

== Honors and awards ==
- Awarded a posthumous Bronze Star (June 1944) and a Purple Heart by the U.S. government for military service.
- Received a correspondent's valor medal from the National Headliners Club.
- Inducted into the News Photographer's Hall of Fame in New York City in 1944.
- Merle Miller dedicated his book, Island 49 (1945), to Bushemi.
- The Veterans of Foreign Wars Post in Gary, Indiana, was named in Bushemi's honor in 1946.
- The U.S. Army Reserve Training Center in Gary, Indiana, was dedicated to Bushemi's memory in 1957.
- Indiana Associated Press named its award for best new photograph of the year in Bushemi's honor.
- Honored with a posthumous exhibition of his work at the Library of Congress.
- Honored with a posthumous exhibition of his work at the Gary Public Library, April 30–May 21, 1944, that included 200 Bushemi photos. The exhibition was sponsored by Yank and the Gary Post-Tribune.
- Inducted into the Indiana Journalism Hall of Fame in 2001.

== Sources ==
- The Best From YANK The Army Weekly. New York: E. P. Dutton and Co. 1945.
- Boomhower, Ray E. (2004). "One Shot": The World War II Photography of John A. Bushemi. Indianapolis: Indiana Historical Society. ISBN 0871951746.
- Boomhower, Ray E. (Winter 2002). "John A. Bushemi: Combat Photographer". Traces of Indiana and Midwestern History. 14 (1). Indianapolis: Indiana Historical Society: 4–15.
- Lane, James B. (1978). City of the Century: A History of Gary, Indiana. Bloomington: Indiana University Press. ISBN 9780253111876.
- Weithas, Art (1991). Close to Glory: The Untold Stories of WWII By the GIs Who Saw and Reported the War — YANK MAGAZINE Correspondents. Austin, TX: Eakin Press. ISBN 0-89015-825-8.
