= Stratton House (Centerville, Iowa) =

Historic house in Iowa, United States

- U.S. National Register of Historic Places
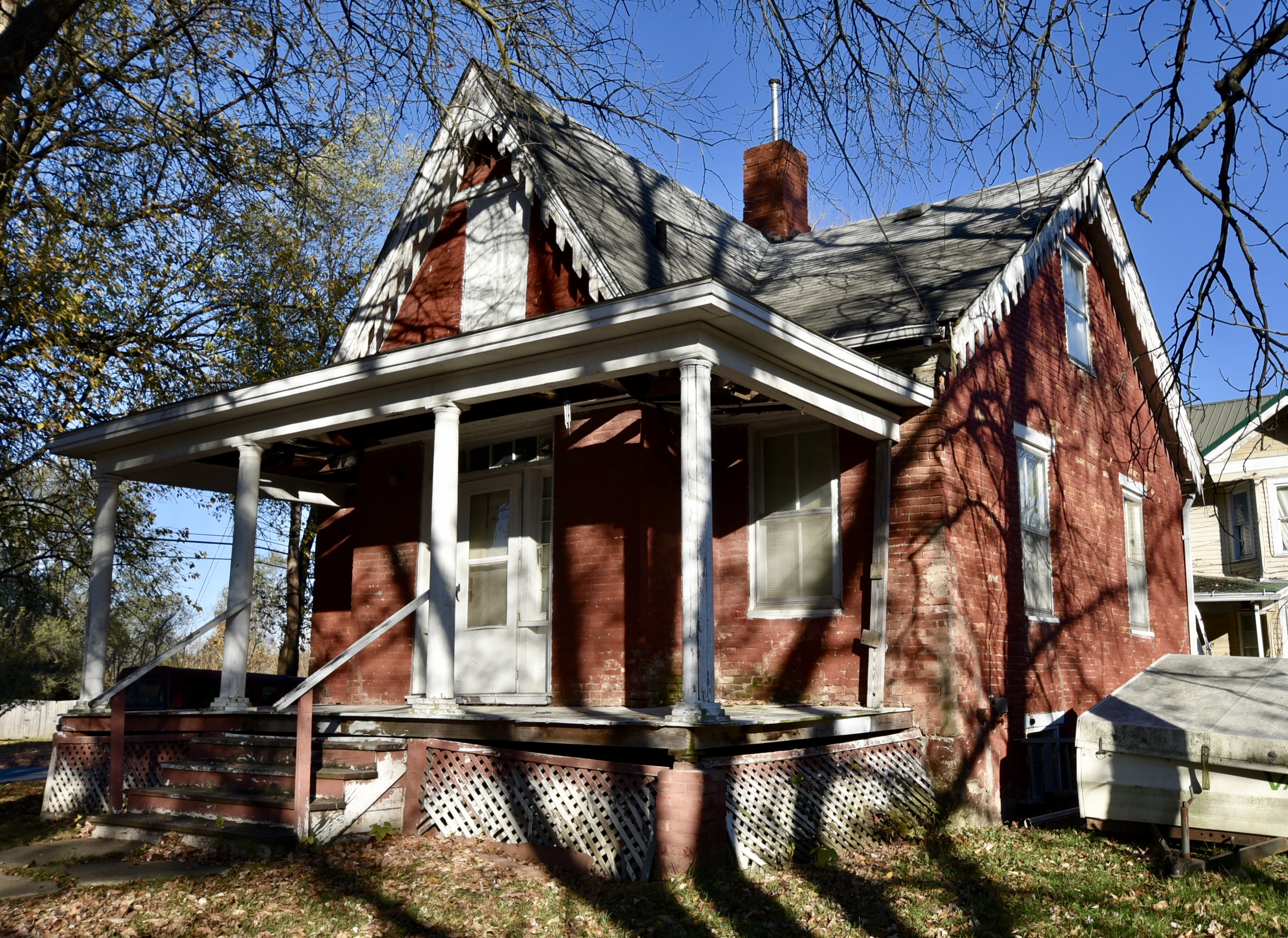

- Location within Iowa Location within the United States
- Location: 303 E. Washington St. Centerville, Iowa
- Coordinates: 40°44′09″N 92°52′19″W
- Area: less than one acre
- Built: 1858
- Architectural style: Gothic Revival
- NRHP reference No.: 75000677
- Added to NRHP: September 9, 1975

Stratton House is a historic residence located in Centerville, Iowa, United States. The 1½-story brick house exhibits aspects of the Gothic Revival style, especially in its plan, steeply pitched gables and bargeboard trim. It was built by Jonathan F. Stratton. Stratton was a Pennsylvania native who moved to Michigan in 1820 where he was a surveyor, community leader, commissioner of highways and Justice of the Peace. In 1841 he was the first person to stake a claim in Appanoose County, near present-day Cincinnati, Iowa. After moving to Udell Township two years later his home was the location for the first religious service and the first election in the county. His wife taught several local children in their home making it the first school in the northern part of the county. He opened the first grist mill in the county in 1845. The following year, Stratton surveyed, platted and settled Centerville, which had been named the new county seat. He built this house in 1858, and died here in 1884. It was listed on the National Register of Historic Places in 1975.
