= Second C. A. Sawyer House =

Historic house in Massachusetts, United States

- C. A. Sawyer House (Second)
- U.S. National Register of Historic Places
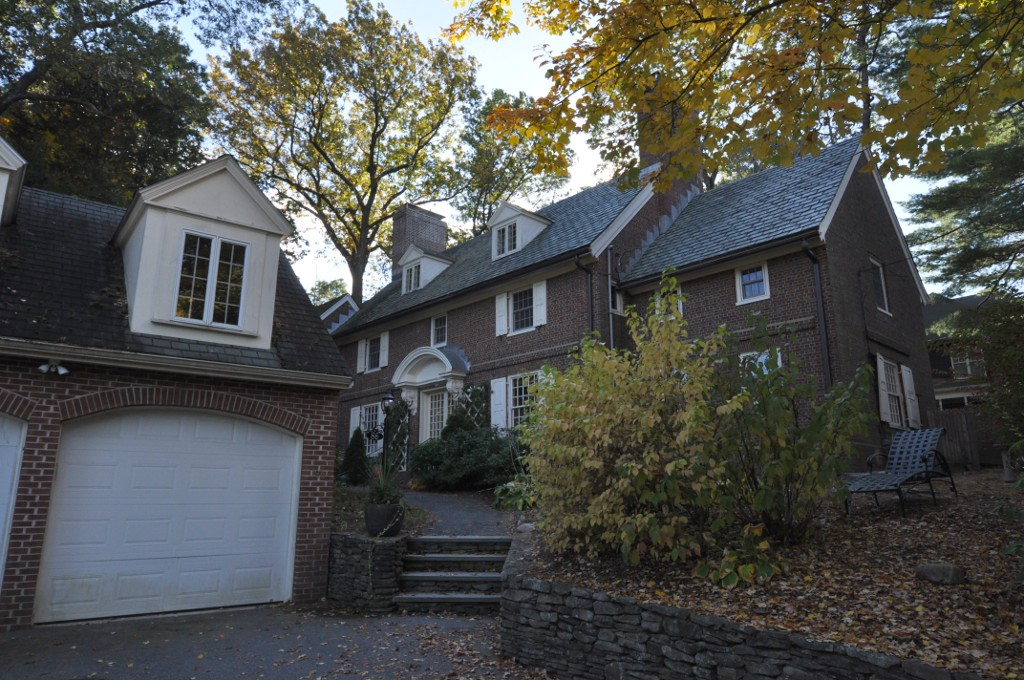

- Location within Massachusetts Location within the United States
- Location: 86 Waban Ave., Newton, Massachusetts
- Coordinates: 42°19′28″N 71°14′5″W
- Built: 1919
- Architect: Derby & Robinson
- Architectural style: Colonial Revival
- MPS: Newton MRA
- NRHP reference No.: 90000043
- Added to NRHP: February 16, 1990

The Second C. A. Sawyer House is a historic house at 86 Waban Ave. in Newton, Massachusetts. The 2 1/2-story brick building was designed by Derby and Robinson and built in 1919. It is a well-executed example of Colonial Revival styling in brick, and demonstrates infill construction in established neighborhoods. It is the second of three houses designed by Derby and Robinson for Charles Adrian Sawyer, a builder, and built between 1910 and 1926.

The house was listed on the National Register of Historic Places in 1990 as "C. A. Sawyer House (Second)". The National Register incorrectly lists it at 221 Prince Street.

== See also ==
- National Register of Historic Places listings in Newton, Massachusetts
