= Drake Public Library =

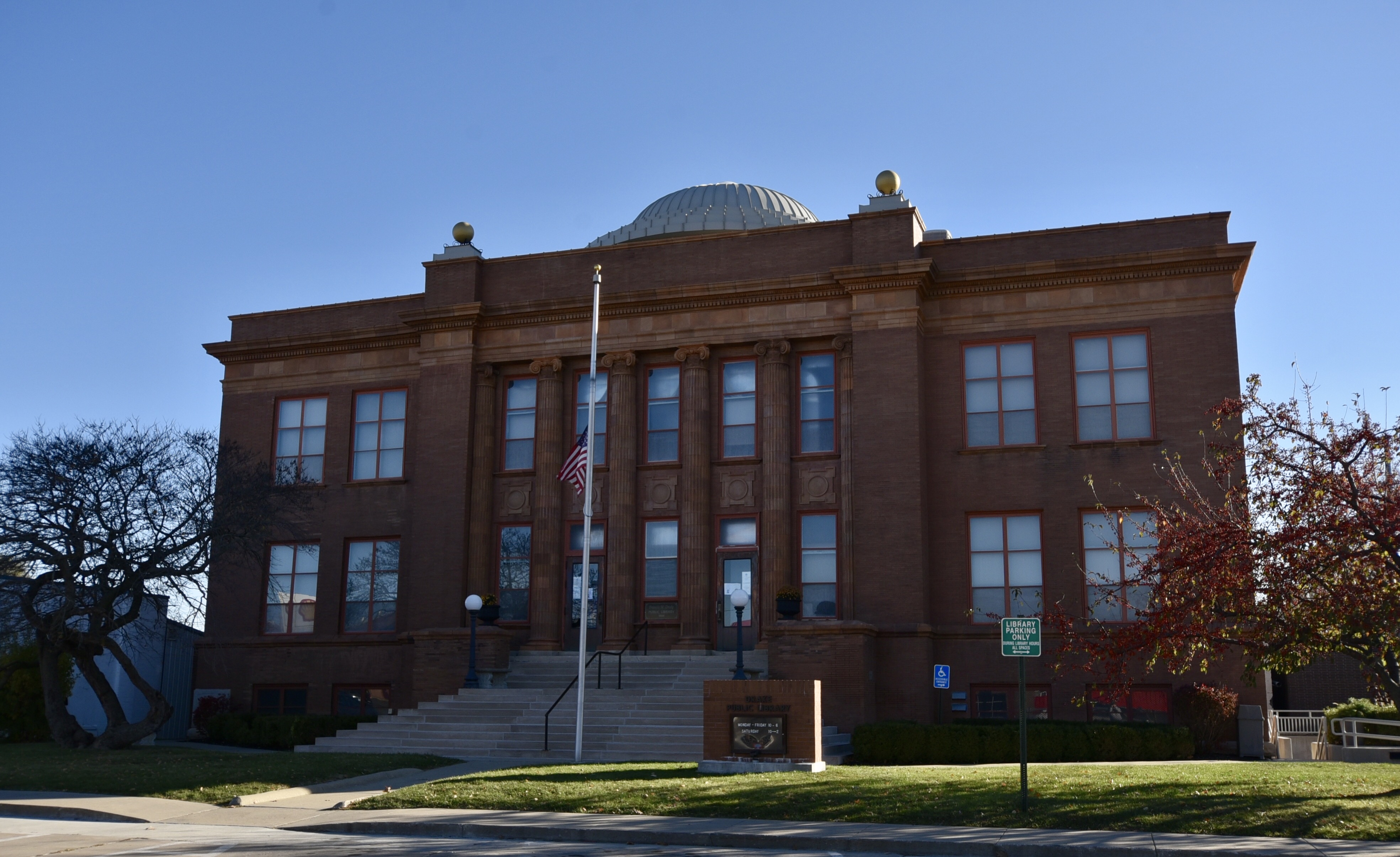
- Location: 115 Drake Ave. Centerville, Iowa, United States
- Type: Public
- Established: 1868

Other information
- Director: Jami Livingston
- Website: drakepubliclibrary.org
- Drake Public Library
- U.S. National Register of Historic Places
- Location within Iowa Location within the United States
- Coordinates: 40°43′55″N 92°52′20″W
- Area: Less than one acre
- Built: 1903
- Built by: J.W. Sanderson
- Architect: C.E. Eastman
- Architectural style: Classical Revival
- MPS: Centerville MPS
- NRHP reference No.: 97001290
- Added to NRHP: October 30, 1997

Drake Public Library is a public library located in Centerville, Iowa, United States. It was established in 1901, and the building was placed on the National Register of Historic Places in 1997.

== History ==
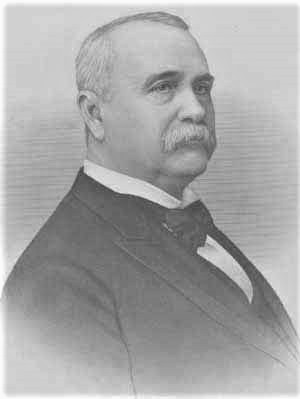
Francis M. Drake

Previous to the establishment of a public library, Centerville had a reading room founded by the Ladies of the Reading Room Library Association Group in 1896. Around the turn of the 20th century citizens started to investigate the possibility of establishing a library and approaching the Carnegie Corporation of New York to fund a new building. They approached Francis M. Drake, a former Civil War general, local attorney, banker, businessman, governor of Iowa and philanthropist to join their effort. He refused saying he would prefer to fund the new library himself. Drake sent an official proposal to the city council on April 9, 1901. He would donate both the new building and the books with the requirement that the city was to maintain the building and take care of the annual expenses. The building was designed in the Neoclassical style by Des Moines architect C.E. Eastman. J.W. Sanderson of Burlington, Iowa was contracted to build the new library for $23,521. Its dedication was held on January 15, 1903. A handicapped entrance and an elevator were added to the building in 1986. Renovation of the glass dome was done in 2003, and an interior renovation was completed in 2008.

== Architecture ==
The 49-by-92-foot (15 by 28 m) brick structure is two stories in height, and built on a raised foundation. The central pavilion of the main facade features columns in the Ionic order and a shallow dome over the center of the roof. Heavy pilasters frame the center and are capped with large stone orbs. The two entrance doors are reached by a large exterior staircase. Two rectangular wings extend from the pavilion. The north wing originally housed the books, while the south wing housed the reading rooms. The circulation desk is in the rotunda, which is capped with a stained glass dome. A curving staircase that was originally located in the east side of the rotunda has been replaced by the elevator, and a new staircase was built in the northeast corner.
