= Centerville Municipal Airport (Iowa) =

- IATA: none; ICAO: KTVK; FAA LID: TVK

Summary
- Airport type: Public
- Owner: City of Centerville
- Serves: Centerville, Iowa
- Elevation AMSL: 1,023 ft (312 m)
- Coordinates: 40°41′04″N 092°54′04″W

Map
- Location of airport in Iowa/United States TVK (the United States)

Runways
Direction	Length		Surface
Direction	ft	m	Surface
16/34	4,099	1,249	Concrete

Statistics (2008)
- Aircraft operations: 5,750
- Based aircraft: 12
- Source: Federal Aviation Administration

Centerville Municipal Airport (ICAO: KTVK, FAA LID: TVK) is a city-owned public-use airport located three nautical miles (6 km) southwest of the central business district of Centerville, a city in Appanoose County, Iowa, United States. According to the FAA's National Plan of Integrated Airport Systems for 2009–2013, it is categorized as a general aviation airport.

Although many U.S. airports use the same three-letter location identifier for the FAA and IATA, this airport is assigned TVK by the FAA and no designation from the IATA.

== Facilities and aircraft ==
Centerville Municipal Airport covers an area of 178 acres (72 ha) at an elevation of 1,023 feet (312 m) above mean sea level. It has one runway designated 16/34 with a concrete surface measuring 4,099 by 75 feet (1,249 x 23 m).

For the 12-month period ending July 2, 2008, the airport had 5,750 general aviation aircraft operations, an average of 15 per day. At that time there were 12 aircraft based at this airport: 92% single-engine and 8% multi-engine.

== See also ==
- List of airports in Iowa
