= Mary Van Duzer-Sayer House =

Historic house in New York, United States

- U.S. National Register of Historic Places
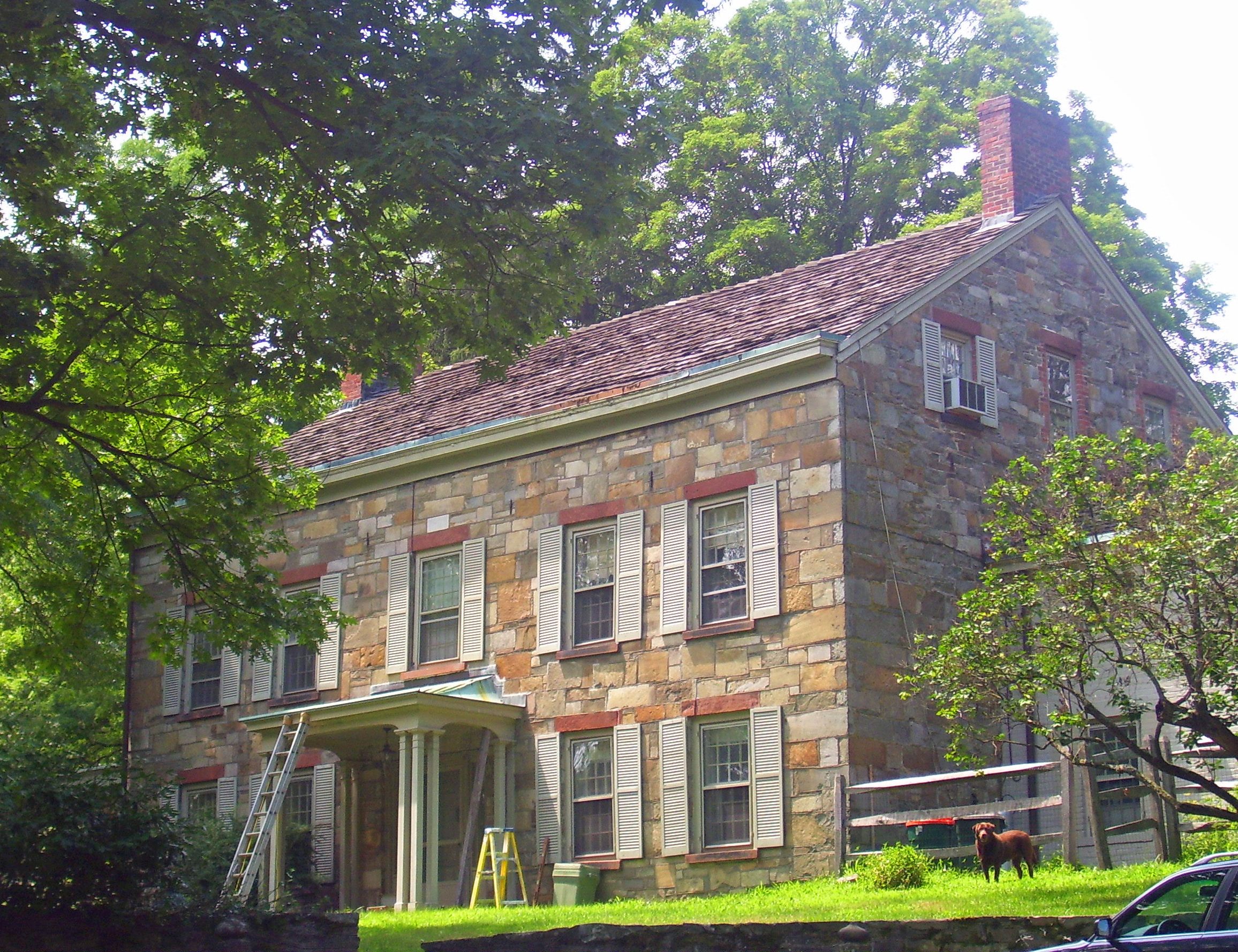
- Front (east) elevation and north profile, with work on house, 2008
- Location: Mountainville, NY
- Nearest city: Newburgh
- Coordinates: 41°24′42″N 74°04′56″W
- Area: 154 acres (62 ha)
- Built: 1832
- Architectural style: Federal style
- MPS: Historic and Architectural Resources of Cornwall
- NRHP reference No.: 96000155
- Added to NRHP: 1996

The Mary Van Duzer-Sayer House is the main residence of a 154-acre (62 ha) former farm on Taylor Road near the hamlet of Mountainville in the Town of Cornwall, New York, United States. It is a stone Federal style house built in 1832.

Mary Van Duzer was the granddaughter of Isaac Van Duzer, one of Cornwall's early settlers and landowners. The farm she built with her husband was the southern tip of her grandfather's original landholdings. It remained in her family until 1903. In 1996 it was listed on the National Register of Historic Places (NRHP).

== Property ==
There are two contributing resources to the NRHP listing: the house and a neighboring root cellar built into the slope behind it. Both are located at the front of the property, which extends to the Metro-North Port Jervis Line tracks to the rear traversing Schunemunk Mountain.

The house is two stories high and five bays wide. It is faced in coursed fieldstone, quoined at the corners with larger stones. A cornice runs around the entire gabled roof, shingled in wood with a brick chimney at the north. The windows have brownstone sills and lintels in front and brick surrounds on the north elevation, consistent with a brick addition on that side. On the south is a flat-roofed porch supported by five wooden columns, running the entire length of that side.

A portico, with ten square wood columns, Tuscan capitals, a pent roof and slate-tiled floor shelters the main entrance. Above the central window on the second story is a small stone with "1832" engraved into it.

The paneled wooden door leads into a center hall. Surrounding rooms have many intact original features and woodwork, including two Adamesque mantels supported by fluted pilasters. Upstairs, the bedrooms also contain much original finishing and trim.

== History ==
Before marrying William Sayer in 1831, Mary Van Duzer obtained the farm parcel from her father Henry. It was the southern end of her grandfather's original holdings, by then mostly subdivided and sold. The house was built the next year and the couple operated the farm and raised their family. The former did well enough that the Orange County Agricultural Society considered it a prize farm in 1841.

Sayer is listed as the property owner as late as 1859. In 1875, the owner was an A.J. Sayer, and then in 1903 Margaret Scott. It has remained a private residence throughout its existence.
