= Appanoose County Courthouse =

- U.S. National Register of Historic Places
- U.S. Historic district – Contributing property
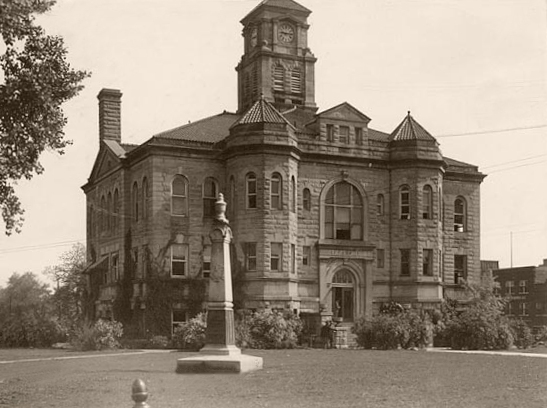

- Location within Iowa Location within the United States
- Interactive map showing the location for Appanoose County Courthouse
- Location: Centerville, Iowa
- Coordinates: 40°44′1.58″N 92°52′28.09″W
- Built: 1903
- Built by: W.M. Peatman
- Architect: Wetherell & Gage
- Architectural style: Late 19th and 20th Century Revivals
- Part of: Courthouse Square Historic District (ID97001291)
- MPS: County Courthouses in Iowa TR
- NRHP reference No.: 81000225
- Added to NRHP: July 2, 1981

The Appanoose County Courthouse is located in the county seat of Centerville, Iowa, United States. The courthouse was placed on the National Register of Historic Places in 1981. In 1997 it was included as a contributing property in the Courthouse Square Historic District.

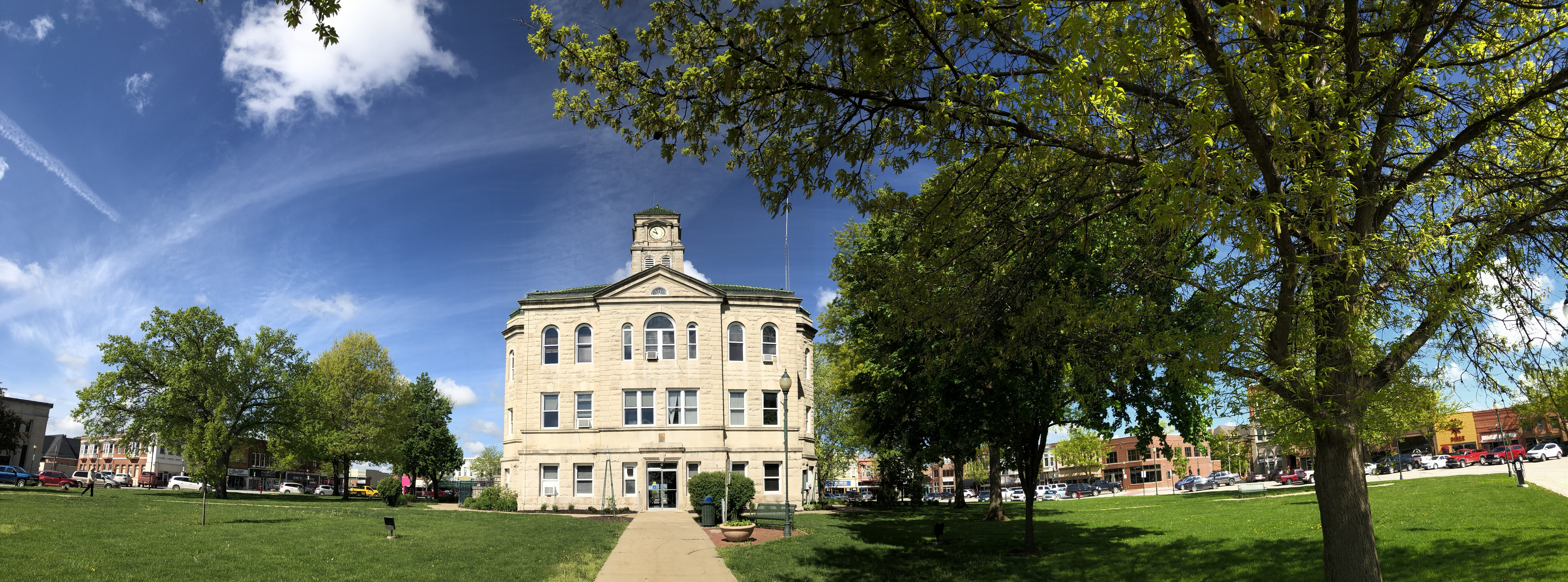
Appanoose County Courthouse in April 2019.

== History ==
The first structure used for court purposes in Appanoose County was also used as a storeroom and a blacksmith's shop. The first true courthouse was a 24-by-20-foot (7.3 by 6.1 m) structure built in 1848 for $160 in Centerville. After the county outgrew this building, court sessions were held in the Methodist and Presbyterian churches while another courthouse was built. It was a two-story, brick building built for $23,000. In 1891 it was declared unsafe and condemned.

The architects for the present courthouse was the Des Moines architectural firm of Wetherell and Gage. In February 1903 the contract, exclusive of heating and plumbing, was awarded to William Peatman, the amount of his bid being $69,900. The cornerstone was laid on May 21, 1903. The courthouse was dedicated on September 12, 1904, and rededicated in a festive ceremony on September 12, 2004.

== Architecture ==
The two-story rusticated limestone structure is built on a high foundation. Its eclectic appearance combines large polygonal bays and rock-faced stone from the medieval revivals with classical details found in the pediments and the pilastered main entrance. A large round arch window is located over the main entrance, and the building is capped with a two-stage central clock tower.
