= Centerville, Iowa =

Centerville
- City
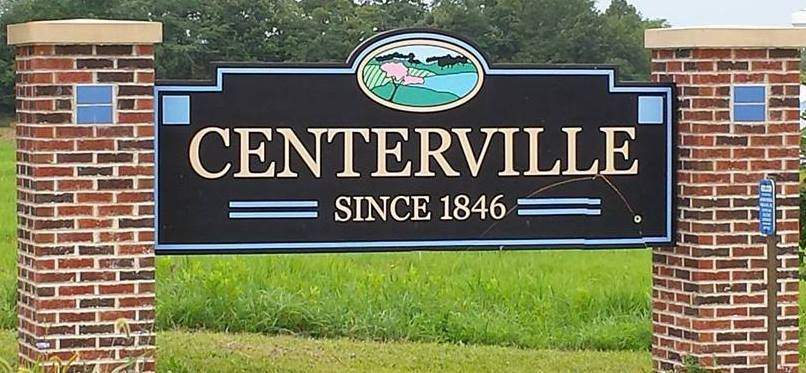
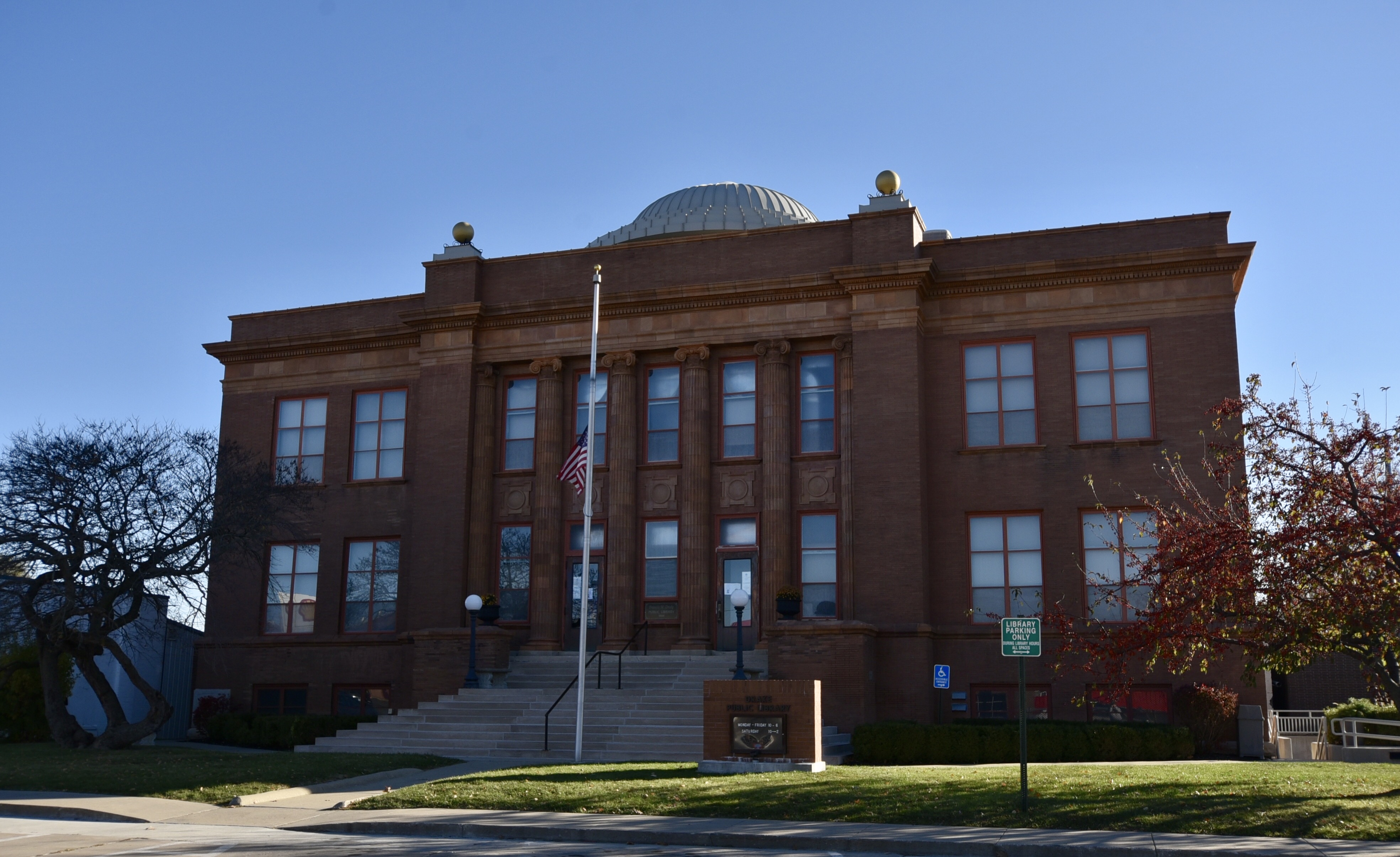
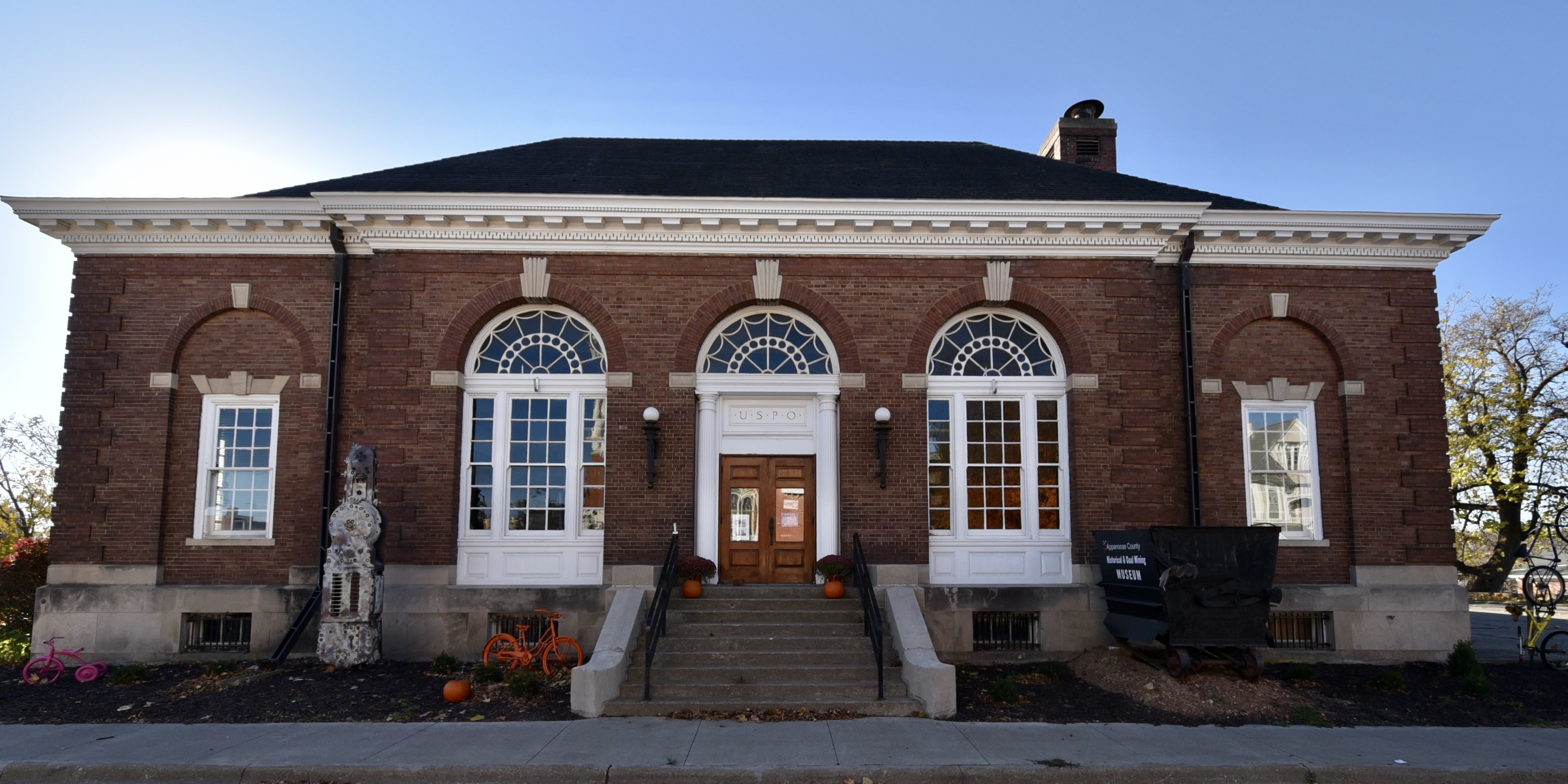
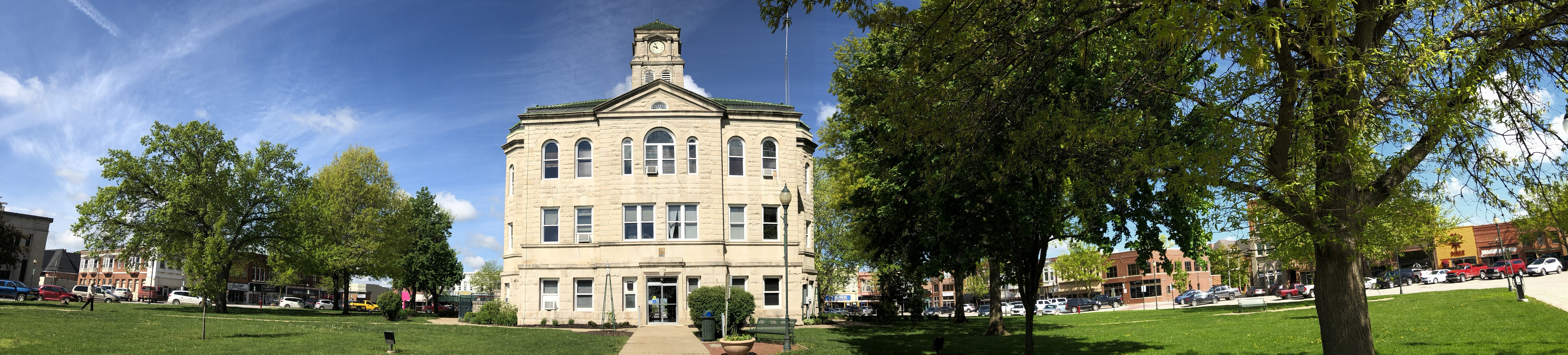
- Centerville welcome sign Drake Public Library Centerville US Post Office Appanoose County Courthouse and Square

- Seal Logo

- Location of Centerville, Iowa

- Location within Iowa Location within the United States
- Coordinates: 40°44′15″N 92°52′50″W
- Country: US
- State: Iowa
- County: Appanoose
- Founded: 1846
- Incorporated: January 23, 1857
- Founder: Jonathon Stratton
- Named for: William Tandy Senter

Area
  - Total: 4.86 sq mi (12.60 km^{2})
  - Land: 4.84 sq mi (12.53 km^{2})
  - Water: 0.031 sq mi (0.08 km^{2})
- Elevation: 1,007 ft (307 m)

Population (2020)
  - Total: 5,412
  - Density: 1,120/sq mi (432/km^{2})
- Time zone: UTC−6 (Central (CST))
  - Summer (DST): UTC−5 (CDT)
- ZIP Code: 52544
- Area code: 641
- FIPS code: 19-12315
- GNIS feature ID: 467589
- Website: www.centerville-ia.org

Centerville is a city in and the county seat of Appanoose County, Iowa, United States. The population was 5,412 in the 2020 census, a decline from 5,924 in 2000. After the turn of the 20th century Centerville's coal mining industry attracted European immigrants from Sweden, Italy, Croatia, and Albania. Centerville is also home of the largest town square in the state of Iowa and a campus of Indian Hills Community College.

== History ==
Founded in 1846 by Jonathon Stratton under the name of "Chaldea," the city was planned around a unique two-block long city square. The name was later changed to Senterville, named after William Tandy Senter, a prominent Tennessee politician. When incorporation papers were filed in 1855, someone mistook the name for a misspelling and corrected it to Centerville. Incorporation was made official on January 23, 1857.

=== A mining town ===
The first coal mine in Centerville was opened in 1868, with its mine shaft about one-half mile from the Chicago, Burlington and Quincy Railroad depot. Horse-power was used to raise coal from the mines until 1872, when the Watson Coal Company opened a mine equipped with a steam hoist. The Centerville Block Coal Company, organized in 1894, consolidated the operation of numerous mines in the region to become the dominant mining company. In 1914, Centerville Block Coal produced over 100,000 tons of coal, ranking among the top 24 coal producers in the state. Centerville Block's largest competitor, formed around the same time, was the Scandinavian Coal Company, organized by a group of Swedish immigrants. By 1938, coal production in the Centerville region was 600,000 tons per year. The mines were in the Mystic coal bed, 125 feet below ground in Centerville but exposed at the surface in Mystic, 5 miles to the northwest.

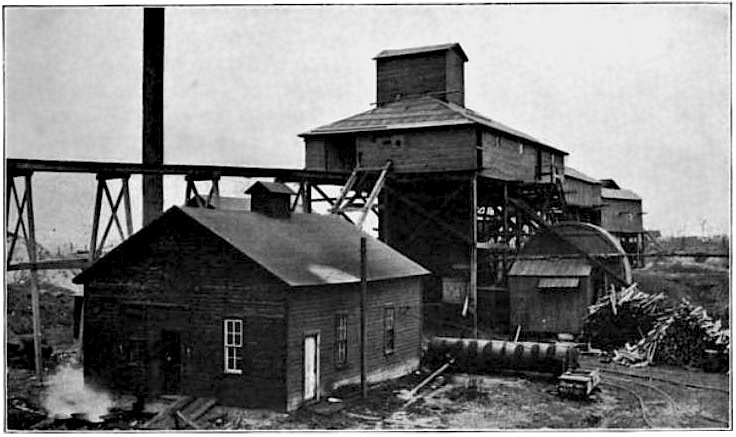
The upper works of the Relay Mine No. 3, circa 1908.

Centerville Block Coal's Relay Mine Number 3 was located on the west side of town (Number 31 on the map). By 1908, the coal face was a mile from the base of the shaft. Mules were used to haul trains of loaded coal tubs to the main haulage way, where they were hauled by a continuous loop of cable the last half mile to the shaft. The coal seam here was about 3 feet thick, and the shaft was 107 feet deep. A centrifugal blower 12 feet in diameter provided ventilation, and compressed air was used to power mining machinery.

Local Assembly 1020 of the Knights of Labor was based in Centerville and had a membership of 150 in 1884. On April 1, 1885, 325 miners in town went on strike, protesting a 20% drop in wages reflecting a decrease in the demand for coal during the summer months. Later, the United Mine Workers of America had a very strong presence in Centerville. In 1912, UMWA Local 553 in Centerville had 1194 members, making it the second largest UMWA local in the country. The largest UMWA local was in Buxton, Iowa.

In 1910, the Scandinavian Coal Company drilled a 550-foot exploratory hole in Centerville, discovering a deposit of gypsum and anhydrite 10 feet thick near the bottom. The Centerville Gypsum Company was formed to exploit this deposit, and between 1912 and 1913, the company bored a shaft down to the gypsum. Water problems delayed the opening of the mine until 1917, and commercial production began in 1919. The mine was closed in the early 1930s.

The Sunshine Mine, about 3 miles west of Centerville (number 30 on the map), was very small in 1908, with just a horse-powered hoist at the pit head. By the 1930s, this was a large mine with an attached mining camp and a mountain of mine waste 500 feet long. The Sunshine Mine Drive-In is a theater on the former mine site that opened in 2005, but has since closed and fallen into disrepair.

=== The post-coal era ===
Centerville experienced its peak population in the early 1900s as the popularity of coal peaked. After that point, as usage dwindled, the coal industry that had been the community's life blood collapsed. In the 1950s and 1960s a civic movement to promote new industries began. This effort culminated in the building of Rathbun Dam, near the city of Rathbun, Iowa, forming Rathbun Lake, known as "Iowa's Ocean", that was dedicated on July 31, 1971, by President Richard M. Nixon.

In June 2006 the Centerville Daily Iowegian reported that the city's largest employer, a Rubbermaid plant, that opened in Centerville in 1985, would shut down in September 2006 displacing 500 workers. In 2007, the former Rubbermaid building was purchased by Lee Container, a manufacturer of products made of high density polyethylene plastic resin.

The Southern Iowa Railroad was an electric interurban connecting Centerville to Moravia with a branch to Mystic. The railroad disbanded in 1967. The Appanoose County Community Railroad (APNC) was a short-line railroad founded in 1984, operating on discarded former rail lines, and connecting to the BNSF railroad in Albia. The APNC was succeeded by the Iowa Southern Railway in 2016 and still provides rail service to the city.

== Geography ==
Centerville is located in south-central Iowa at the junction of Iowa Highway 2 and Iowa Highway 5.

According to the United States Census Bureau, the city has a total area of 4.89 square miles (12.67 km^{2}), of which 4.86 square miles (12.59 km^{2}) is land and 0.03 square miles (0.08 km^{2}) is water.

=== Climate ===
According to the Köppen Climate Classification system, Centerville has a hot-summer humid continental climate, abbreviated "Dfa" on climate maps.

Climate data for Centerville, Iowa, 1991–2020 normals, extremes 1893–present
Month	Jan	Feb	Mar	Apr	May	Jun	Jul	Aug	Sep	Oct	Nov	Dec	Year
Record high °F (°C)	80 (27)	78 (26)	90 (32)	90 (32)	101 (38)	104 (40)	110 (43)	110 (43)	106 (41)	94 (34)	81 (27)	74 (23)	110 (43)
Mean maximum °F (°C)	55.5 (13.1)	59.7 (15.4)	73.6 (23.1)	81.5 (27.5)	86.1 (30.1)	90.6 (32.6)	91.4 (33.0)	93.9 (34.4)	89.5 (31.9)	82.2 (27.9)	70.1 (21.2)	59.4 (15.2)	95.2 (35.1)
Mean daily maximum °F (°C)	32.7 (0.4)	37.7 (3.2)	50.5 (10.3)	62.9 (17.2)	72.3 (22.4)	81.5 (27.5)	85.8 (29.9)	84.3 (29.1)	76.3 (24.6)	64.4 (18.0)	50.3 (10.2)	38.0 (3.3)	61.4 (16.3)
Daily mean °F (°C)	22.3 (−5.4)	26.8 (−2.9)	38.5 (3.6)	50.0 (10.0)	60.3 (15.7)	70.3 (21.3)	74.5 (23.6)	72.6 (22.6)	64.2 (17.9)	52.5 (11.4)	39.1 (3.9)	28.1 (−2.2)	49.9 (10.0)
Mean daily minimum °F (°C)	12.0 (−11.1)	16.0 (−8.9)	26.5 (−3.1)	37.1 (2.8)	48.4 (9.1)	59.1 (15.1)	63.1 (17.3)	60.9 (16.1)	52.1 (11.2)	40.6 (4.8)	27.9 (−2.3)	18.2 (−7.7)	38.5 (3.6)
Mean minimum °F (°C)	−7.5 (−21.9)	−2.5 (−19.2)	8.9 (−12.8)	24.3 (−4.3)	36.3 (2.4)	48.7 (9.3)	56.3 (13.5)	53.6 (12.0)	39.7 (4.3)	27.0 (−2.8)	13.1 (−10.5)	0.8 (−17.3)	−11.6 (−24.2)
Record low °F (°C)	−30 (−34)	−24 (−31)	−17 (−27)	6 (−14)	27 (−3)	39 (4)	45 (7)	39 (4)	23 (−5)	0 (−18)	−11 (−24)	−28 (−33)	−30 (−34)
Average precipitation inches (mm)	0.99 (25)	1.26 (32)	2.15 (55)	3.88 (99)	5.22 (133)	4.71 (120)	3.45 (88)	3.86 (98)	3.85 (98)	3.01 (76)	2.19 (56)	1.46 (37)	36.03 (917)
Average snowfall inches (cm)	7.1 (18)	5.0 (13)	3.2 (8.1)	1.7 (4.3)	0.0 (0.0)	0.0 (0.0)	0.0 (0.0)	0.0 (0.0)	0.0 (0.0)	0.3 (0.76)	1.9 (4.8)	2.3 (5.8)	21.5 (54.76)
Average precipitation days (≥ 0.01 in)	5.3	6.2	6.7	9.2	11.4	9.8	7.1	7.9	6.8	7.8	6.2	5.1	89.5
Average snowy days (≥ 0.1 in)	3.2	3.4	1.4	0.4	0.0	0.0	0.0	0.0	0.0	0.2	0.8	2.0	11.4
Source 1: NOAA
Source 2: National Weather Service

== Demographics ==
Historical population
Year	Pop.	±%
1850	1,137	—
1860	509	−55.2%
1870	1,037	+103.7%
1880	2,475	+138.7%
1890	3,668	+48.2%
1900	5,256	+43.3%
1910	6,936	+32.0%
1920	8,486	+22.3%
1930	8,147	−4.0%
1940	8,413	+3.3%
1950	7,625	−9.4%
1960	6,629	−13.1%
1970	6,531	−1.5%
1980	6,558	+0.4%
1990	5,936	−9.5%
2000	5,924	−0.2%
2010	5,528	−6.7%
2020	5,412	−2.1%
Iowa Data Center; Source: U.S. Decennial Census

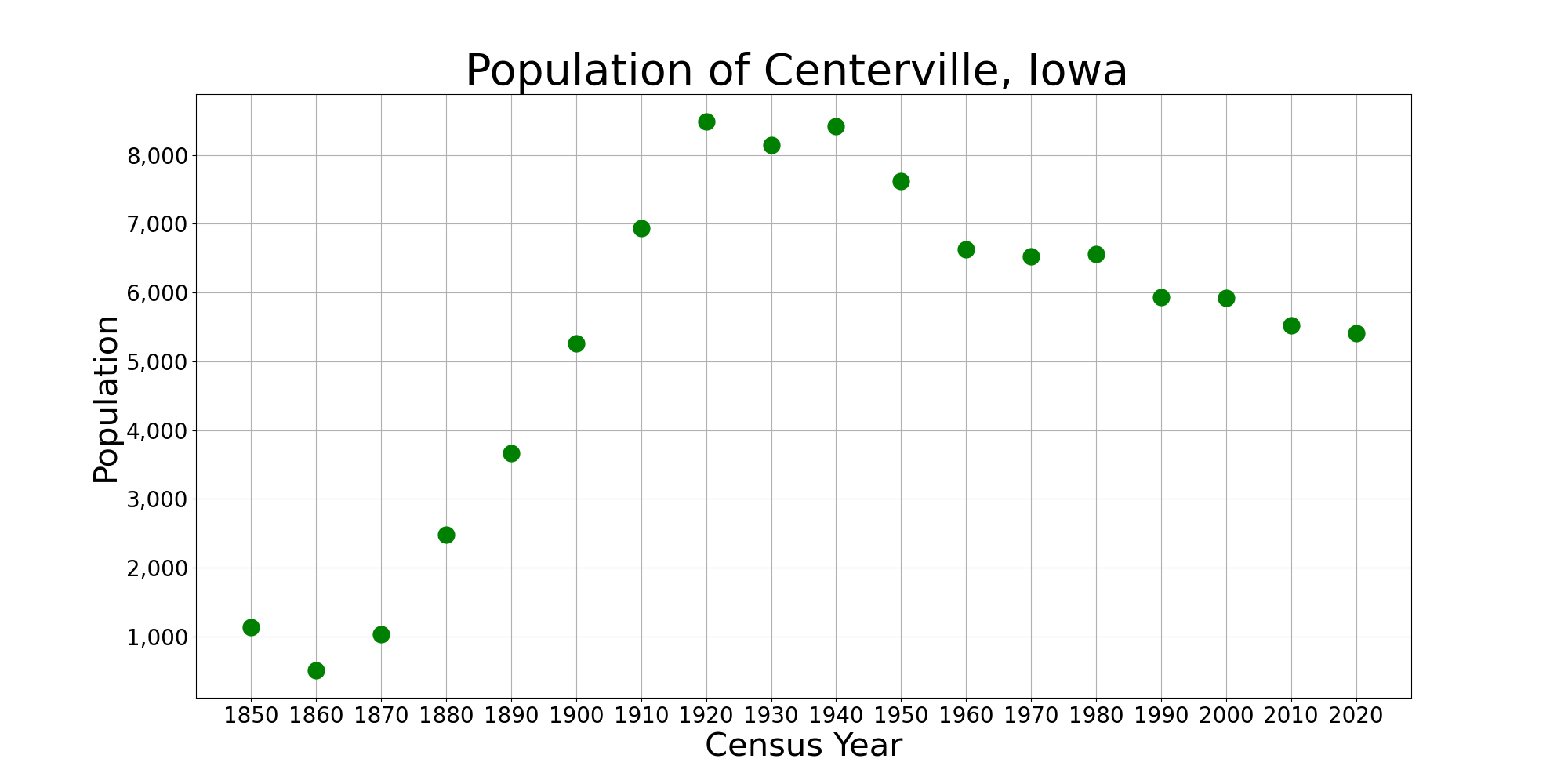
Centerville population, from US census data

=== 2020 census ===
As of the 2020 census, there were 5,412 people, 2,378 households, and 1,315 families residing in the city. The population density was 1,119.9 inhabitants per square mile (432.4/km^{2}). There were 2,734 housing units at an average density of 565.8 per square mile (218.4/km^{2}).

The median age was 42.3 years. 21.9% of residents were under the age of 18 and 21.8% were 65 years of age or older. 5.9% of residents were between the ages of 20 and 24, 22.7% were from 25 to 44, and 25.5% were from 45 to 64. The gender makeup of the city was 47.4% male and 52.6% female. For every 100 females there were 90.0 males, and for every 100 females age 18 and over there were 87.1 males age 18 and over.

There were 2,378 households, of which 25.4% had children under the age of 18 living with them. Of all households, 36.5% were married-couple households, 7.9% were cohabiting-couple households, 19.9% were households with a male householder and no spouse or partner present, and 35.7% were households with a female householder and no spouse or partner present. About 44.7% of households were non-families, 39.0% of all households were made up of individuals, and 18.2% had someone living alone who was 65 years of age or older.

95.1% of residents lived in urban areas, while 4.9% lived in rural areas. There were 2,734 housing units, of which 13.0% were vacant. The homeowner vacancy rate was 3.8% and the rental vacancy rate was 12.3%.

Racial composition as of the 2020 census
Race	Number	Percent
White	5,020	92.8%
Black or African American	70	1.3%
American Indian and Alaska Native	13	0.2%
Asian	55	1.0%
Native Hawaiian and Other Pacific Islander	4	0.1%
Some other race	29	0.5%
Two or more races	221	4.1%
Hispanic or Latino (of any race)	165	3.0%

=== 2010 census ===
As of the census of 2010, there were 5,528 people, 2,491 households, and 1,411 families residing in the city. The population density was 1,137.4 inhabitants per square mile (439.2/km^{2}). There were 2,838 housing units at an average density of 584.0 units per square mile (225.5 units/km^{2}). The racial makeup of the city was 96.5% White, 0.9% African American, 0.4% Native American, 0.3% Asian, 0.3% from other races, and 1.5% from two or more races. Hispanic or Latino of any race were 1.9% of the population.

There were 2,491 households, of which 27.5% had children under the age of 18 living with them, 38.4% were married couples living together, 13.9% had a female householder with no husband present, 4.3% had a male householder with no wife present, and 43.4% were non-families. 37.9% of all households were made up of individuals, and 17.6% had someone living alone who was 65 years of age or older. The average household size was 2.17 and the average family size was 2.84.

The median age in the city was 41.8 years. 22.6% of residents were under the age of 18; 9% were between the ages of 18 and 24; 22.2% were from 25 to 44; 26.1% were from 45 to 64; and 20.2% were 65 years of age or older. The gender makeup of the city was 46.6% male and 53.4% female.

=== 2000 census ===
As of the census of 2000, there were 5,924 people, 2,583 households, and 1,516 families residing in the city. The population density was 1,310.5 inhabitants per square mile (506.0/km^{2}). There were 2,935 housing units at an average density of 649.3 units per square mile (250.7 units/km^{2}). The racial makeup of the city was 97.35% White, 0.81% African American, 0.14% Native American, 0.37% Asian, 0.44% from other races, and 0.89% from two or more races. Hispanic or Latino of any race were 1.52% of the population.

There were 2,583 households, out of which 27.3% had children under the age of 18 living with them, 43.4% were married couples living together, 11.9% had a female householder with no husband present, and 41.3% were non-families. 36.3% of all households were made up of individuals, and 18.7% had someone living alone who was 65 years of age or older. The average household size was 2.21 and the average family size was 2.88.

Age spread: 23.3% under the age of 18, 8.9% from 18 to 24, 25.2% from 25 to 44, 19.9% from 45 to 64, and 22.8% who were 65 years of age or older. The median age was 39 years. For every 100 females, there were 82.4 males. For every 100 females age 18 and over, there were 78.0 males.

The median income for a household in the city was $25,498, and the median income for a family was $36,855. Males had a median income of $28,333 versus $21,207 for females. The per capita income for the city was $13,574. About 11.3% of families and 18.2% of the population were below the poverty line, including 18.2% of those under age 18 and 14.7% of those age 65 or over.

== Economy ==
Largest employers (2019)
Employer	Size Class
Barker Co. Ltd	250-499
Lee Container	100-249
Mercy One Centerville Medical Center	100-249
Centerville Community School District (and affiliated schools)	100-249
Walmart Supercenter	100-249
Hy-Vee	100-249
Fareway	100-249
C&C Machining	50-99

== Arts and culture ==
=== Pancake Day ===
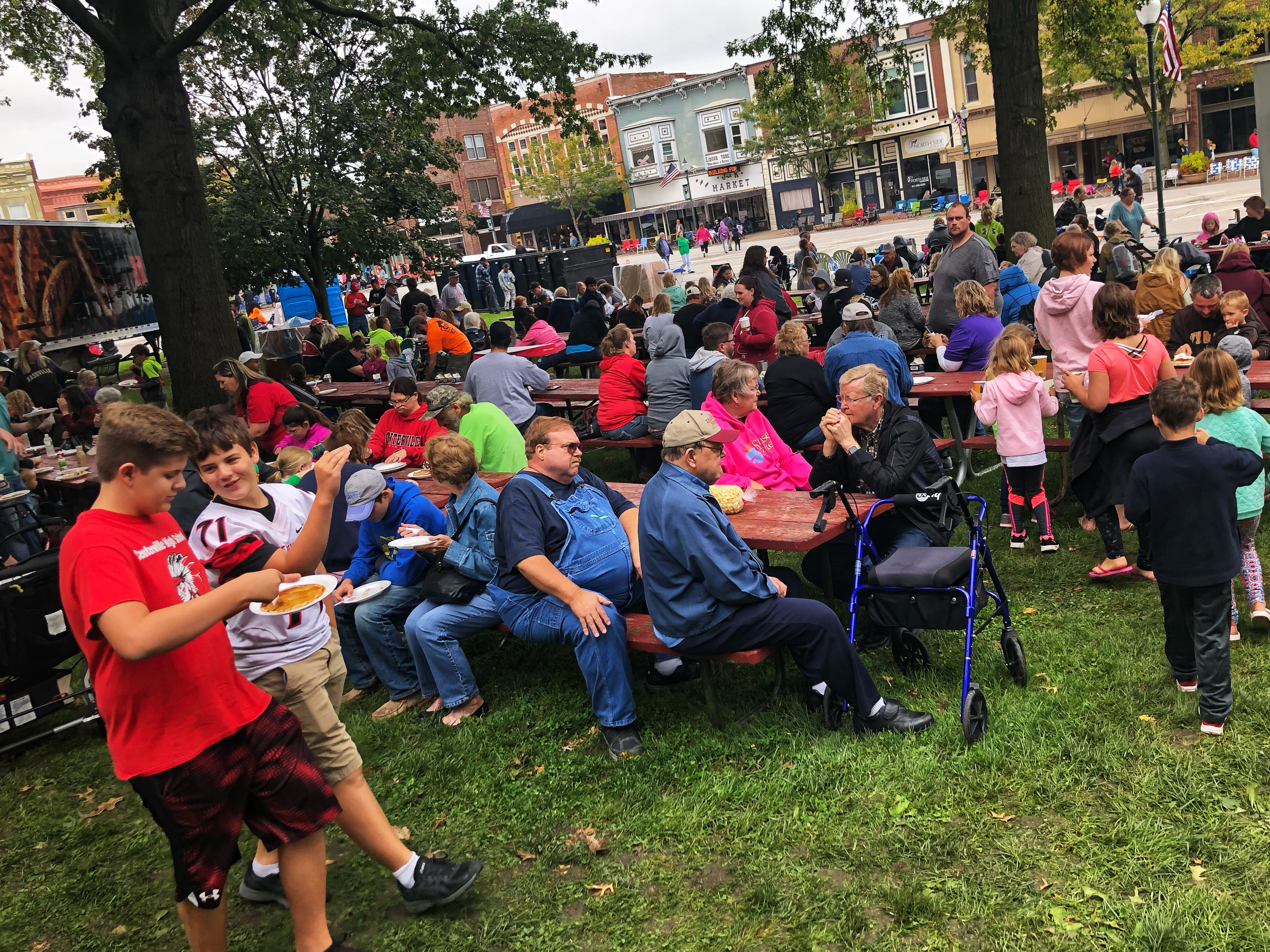
Pancake Day in Centerville draws thousands of visitors annually

Since 1949, the city has conducted an annual Pancake Day festival. For the first five years, the celebration was held the first Thursday in October until 1954 when it was moved to the last Thursday in September. In 1965 the celebration was moved to the last Saturday in September. Pancake Day is a time for local businesses and organizations to cook up pancakes which they provide for free to their customers to show thanks for their continued patronage. The event that is held in the Courthouse Square Historic District features a morning kiddie parade, a larger afternoon parade with a unique double-loop parade route, a beauty queen contest and free entertainment. On Pancake Day 2021, the Guinness World Record was set when 14,000 pancakes served in four hours.

Pancake Day has been attended by Tennessee Senator Estes Kefauver; James Cash Penney; Philip W. Pillsbury; former Governor of New York, W. Averell Harriman; Muriel Humphrey; Rocky Marciano; and Centerville Native Simon Estes. Entertainers have included Thomas Ian Nicholas, Barbara Mandrell, and Minnie Pearl.

=== Croatian Fest ===
Croatian Fest was held in Centerville from 1987 to 2008.

=== Historic Buildings ===
- Post office.
- Drake Public Library, established in 1901; listed on National Register of Historic Places.
- Appanoose County Sheriff's House and Jail

== Education ==
The school district serving Centerville is the Centerville Community School District. It consists of Centerville High School, Howar Middle, Lakeview Elementary, Central Ward Elementary all located in Centerville. Central Ward Elementary closed in 2020 when classes were moved to Lakeview Elementary.

The first Centerville High School graduate—and the one and only graduate from the Class of 1876—was Jennie Drake, the daughter of former Governor of Iowa Francis M. Drake. The first African-American graduate was Joseph Edwin Herriford, a graduate from the Class of 1885.

=== College ===
Centerville is the home of the Centerville Campus of Indian Hills Community College, a two-year community college, that was established in 1930 as Centerville Junior College, later known as Centerville Community College. On October 1, 1970, the college became the Centerville Campus of Indian Hills Community College when it merged as an Iowa Area XV Community College, which has its main campus located in Ottumwa, Iowa, known as the Ottumwa Campus of Indian Hills Community College. In 1970 the present Centerville Campus of Indian Hills Community College was built on North First Street in Centerville, Iowa.

== Media ==
=== Newspapers ===
- Appanoose Weekly

=== Radio stations ===
==== AM ====
- KCOG 1400 The True Oldies Channel

==== FM radio ====
- KMGO 98.7 Iowa's # 1 Country
- KCOG 103.9 (re-broadcast of the KCOG 1400 AM signal)
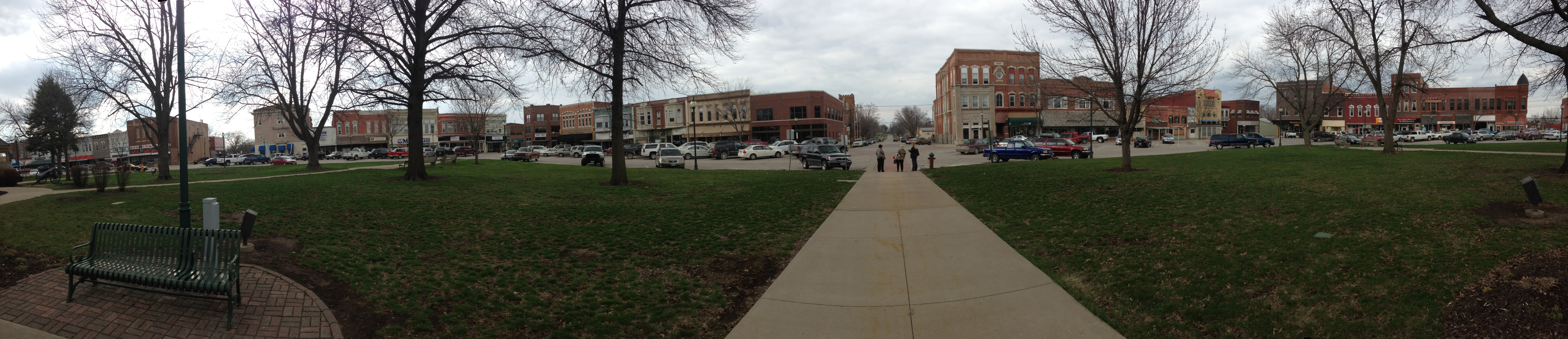
View from the town square

A new main campus building was constructed in 2024/2025 and was occupied in 2025

== Infrastructure ==
=== Transport ===
- Iowa Highway 2 runs east–west through Centerville and Iowa Highway 5 runs north–south.
- Iowa Southern Railway (ISRY), formerly Appanoose County Community Railroad, operated by Progressive Rail, Inc. with class one connections with BNSF, CP, and NS.
- Centerville Municipal Airport, on the southwest edge of Centerville.

=== Utilities ===
Alliant Energy provides electric power and gas. Windstream Holdings, Mediacom, and Natel offer cable television, landline telephone, and internet service. Rathbun Regional Water Association provides drinking water and related services. Centerville Municipal Water is an independent entity that provides water and sewer services. Multiple privately owned trash haulers offer trash removal. Recycling services are available at the Rathbun Area Solid Waste Commission (RASWC).

=== Health care ===
MercyOne Centerville, part of the MercyOne system of hospitals, provides emergency, clinical, and specialty medical services.

== Notable people ==
- Manuel Bromberg, artist
- John Bushemi, photographer
- Francis M. Drake, Governor of Iowa
- Richard Dudman, journalist
- Simon Estes, bass-baritone opera singer
- Mack Garner, jockey in Hall of Fame
- Jonathan Mathews, professional baseball coach
- Rick Mathews, professional baseball coach and scout
- Harry J. Middleton, journalist, writer, and museum director
- Mike Morris, pro football player
- Claude Payton, actor
- Claude R. Porter, government official and politician
- Edna May Spooner, actress
- H.N. Swanson, literary agent
- Andrew W. Tibbets, Medal of Honor recipient in the American Civil War
- John K. Valentine, 29th Lieutenant Governor of Iowa
- Himie Voxman, clarinetist
- Madison M. Walden, Lieutenant Governor of Iowa
