= National Register of Historic Places listings in Davis County, Iowa =

Location of Davis County in Iowa

This is a list of the National Register of Historic Places listings in Davis County, Iowa.

This is intended to be a complete list of the properties and districts on the National Register of Historic Places in Davis County, Iowa, United States. Latitude and longitude coordinates are provided for many National Register properties and districts; these locations may be seen together in a map.

There are 12 properties and districts listed on the National Register in the county, including one National Historic Landmark.

This National Park Service list is complete through NPS recent listings posted March 21, 2025.

	Name on the Register	Image	Date listed	Location	City or town	Description
1	Bloomfield Public Library	Bloomfield Public Library	October 13, 2015 (#15000721)	107 N. Columbia; 40°45′09″N 92°24′59″W	Bloomfield	
2	Bloomfield Square	Bloomfield Square	November 7, 1976 (#76000756)	Madison, Jefferson, Franklin, and Washington Sts. 40°45′05″N 92°24′52″W	Bloomfield	
3	Davis County Courthouse	Davis County Courthouse	May 3, 1974 (#74000779)	Bloomfield Town Sq. 40°45′10″N 92°25′01″W	Bloomfield	
4	William Findley House	William Findley House	June 9, 1978 (#78001213)	302 E. Franklin St. 40°45′01″N 92°24′43″W	Bloomfield	
5	"Lockkeeper's" House		October 14, 2009 (#09000826)	Whitefish Trail; 40°53′35″N 92°12′26″W	Eldon	
6	Stringtown House		April 16, 1974 (#74000780)	East of Centerville on Iowa Highway 2; 40°45′34″N 92°24′10″W	Centerville	
7	Trimble-Parker Historic Farmstead District		March 21, 2003 (#03000125)	23981 240th St. 40°43′01″N 92°22′12″W	Bloomfield	
8	Troy Academy	Troy Academy	June 23, 1976 (#76000758)	Off Iowa Highway 2; 40°44′47″N 92°12′03″W	Troy	
9	James B. Weaver House	James B. Weaver House	May 15, 1975 (#75000680)	Weaver Park Rd. (U.S. Route 63); 40°45′18″N 92°24′44″W	Bloomfield	
10	West Grove United Methodist Church	West Grove United Methodist Church	May 26, 2004 (#04000514)	21944 Echo Ave., 40°43′32″N 92°33′23″W	West Grove	
11	Asa Wilson House	Asa Wilson House	December 10, 1982 (#82000404)	207 S. Washington; 40°45′00″N 92°24′46″W	Bloomfield	
12	Henry Wishard House	Henry Wishard House	December 15, 2004 (#04001350)	406 W. Jefferson St. 40°45′05″N 92°25′11″W	Bloomfield	

== Former listings ==
	Name on the Register	Image	Date listed	Date removed	Location	City or town	Description
1	Clay Avenue Bridge		June 25, 1998 (#98000795)	May 8, 2002	Clay Ave. and 118th St. over intermittent stream 40°44′45″N 92°23′59″W	Drakesville vicinity	Relocated to McGowen recreation area in 1999.
2	Russell Octagon House	Russell Octagon House	October 8, 1976 (#76000757)	June 11, 1998	SW of Bloomfield off U.S. 63	Bloomfield vicinity	
3	Tarrence Round Barn		June 30, 1986 (#86001424)	May 22, 1998	Off IA 2	Bloomfield vicinity	Destroyed by a storm in May 1988.

== See also ==
- List of National Historic Landmarks in Iowa
- National Register of Historic Places listings in Iowa
- Listings in neighboring counties: Appanoose, Jefferson, Monroe, Schuyler (MO), Scotland (MO), Van Buren, Wapello
