= Russell Octagon House =

Historic house in Iowa, United States

Coordinates: 40.72°N 92.56°W

- Formerly listed on the U.S. National Register of Historic Places
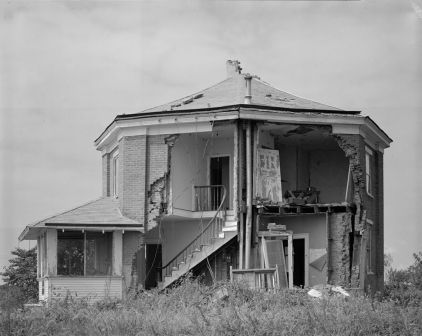
- Russell Octagon House deteriorating in 1983

- Location within Iowa Location within the United States
- Nearest city: Bloomfield, Iowa
- Built: 1859
- Architectural style: Octagon Mode
- NRHP reference No.: 76000757
- Removed from NRHP: June 11, 1998

The Russell Octagon House, built in 1859, was a historic octagonal house in Bloomfield, Iowa, United States. It was also known as the Cook House. Once listed on the National Register of Historic Places, it was removed on June 11, 1998. Apparently it had deteriorated due to the poor quality of its original building materials and the lack of maintenance.
