= L. D. Hotchkiss =

American journalist

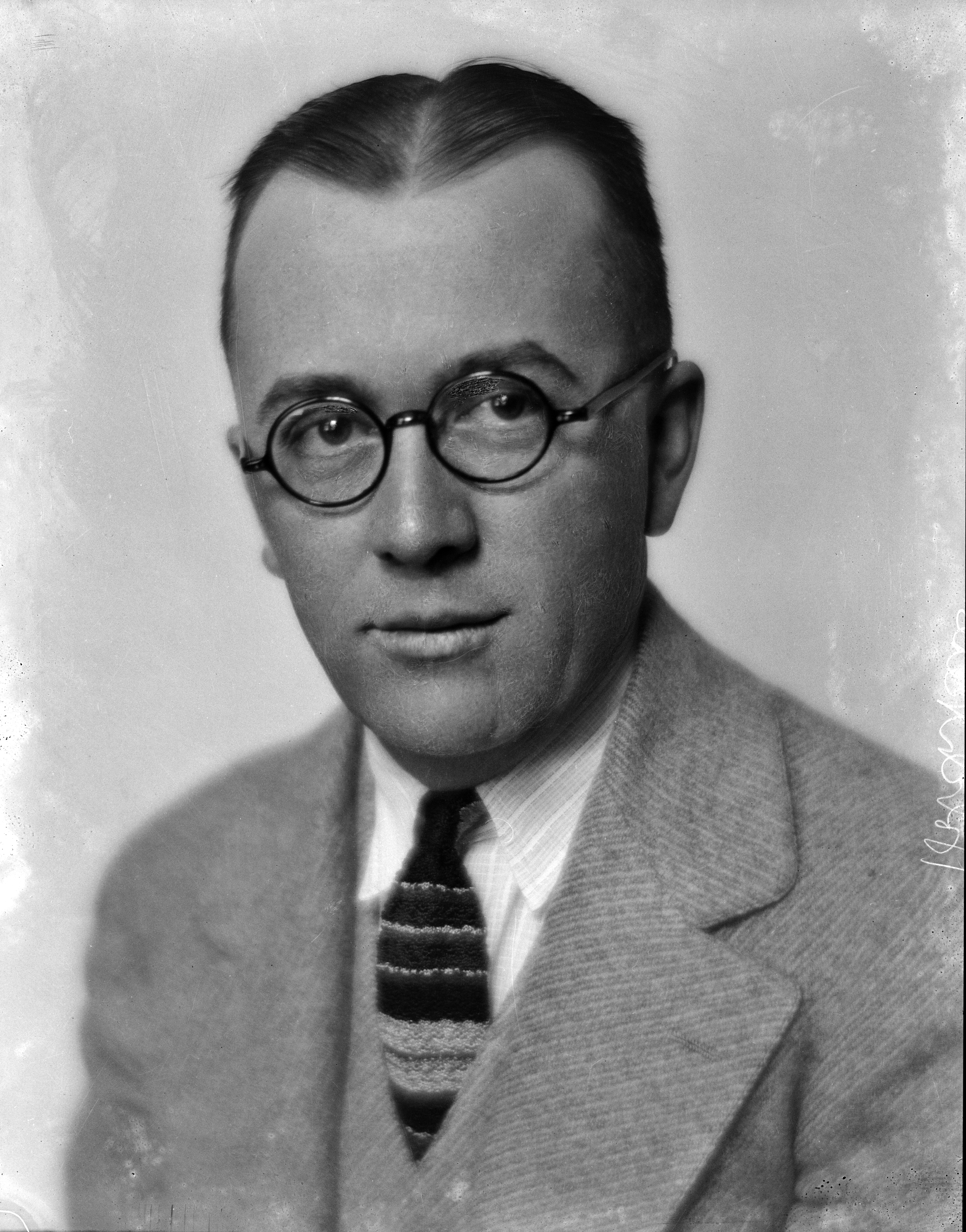
L. D. Hotchkiss

Loyal Durand Hotchkiss (November 25, 1893 – April 15, 1964) was an American newspaper journalist who served as the editor-in-chief of the Los Angeles Times.

The son of Willis M. and Jan Margaret (Ritchie) Hotchkiss, he was born in Bloomfield, Iowa, where he attended public school. In 1916, he graduated from the University of Iowa.

Hotchkiss worked at the Des Moines Daily News, the Rockwell City (IA) Advocate, the Des Moines Capital and the Des Moines Register-Tribune. In 1920, he moved to California, where he worked for William Randolph Hearst’s Los Angeles Examiner. Two years later he moved across town to work for Harry Chandler’s Los Angeles Times, where he would stay for the next 36 years. In 1926, Hotchkiss was named city editor. He became assistant managing editor in 1933, managing editor in 1934, editor in 1945 and editor-in-chief in 1957. Hotchkiss retired in 1958.

In 1938, Hotchkiss, his publisher Norman Chandler, and the Times-Mirror Company (owner of the Los Angeles Times) were jointly found guilty of contempt of court for editorials that commented on pending court cases. The Times took its fight for freedom of the press to the U.S. Supreme Court, where the newspaper was vindicated on December 8, 1941. The newspaper was awarded the 1942 Pulitzer Prize for Public Service "for its successful campaign which resulted in the clarification and confirmation for all American newspapers of the right of free press as guaranteed under the Constitution."

== Notes ==
"L.D. Hotchkiss, Retired Editor of Times, Dies," Los Angeles Times, April 17, 1964.
