= West Grove United Methodist Church =

- U.S. National Register of Historic Places
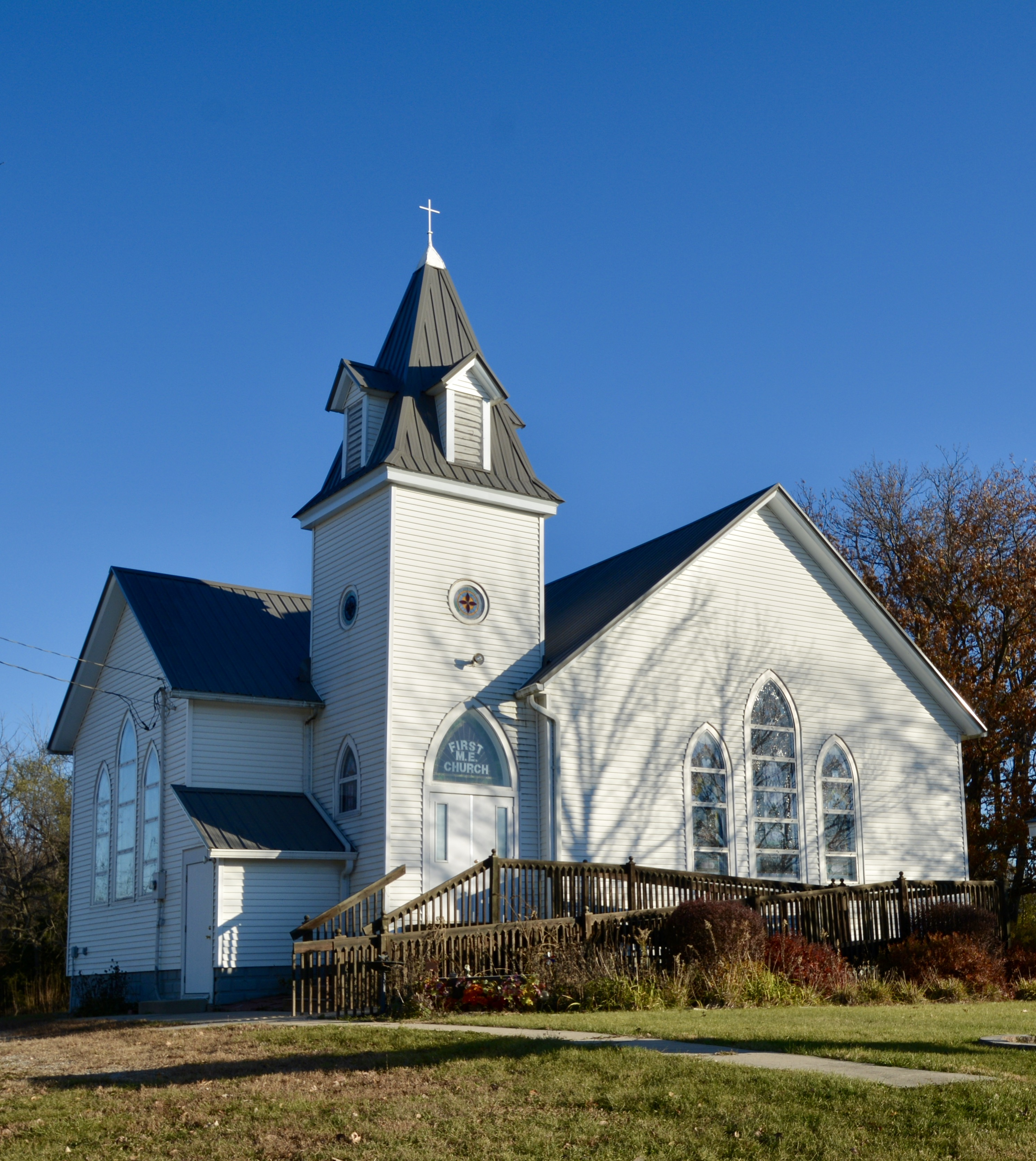

- Location within Iowa Location within the United States
- Location: 21944 Echo Ave. West Grove, Iowa
- Coordinates: 40°43′33″N 92°33′24″W
- Area: less than one acre
- Built: 1904
- Architect: Methodist Board of Church Extension
- Architectural style: Gothic Revival
- NRHP reference No.: 04000514
- Added to NRHP: May 26, 2004

West Grove United Methodist Church is located in the Unincorporated community of West Grove, Iowa, United States. West Grove has always been a Crossroads village, serving the surrounding rural area. At one time it had five churches, and now it has been reduced to this one. The site was originally that of Cumberland Presbyterian Church, which had been organized in 1854 and built in 1881. It eventually became a Lyceum Hall, a school, and then left unoccupied until it was torn down in 1902.

The Methodist Episcopal Church had been formally organized in West Grove in 1899, although it had been active in town since 1871. The men of the church and friends of the church built the current frame Gothic Revival sanctuary. They followed building plans provided by the Methodist Board of Church Extension. It was completed in 1904 for $2,000. The congregation almost disbanded and lost its church in the 1920s through the abandonment of services. It was affiliated with the Methodist Church after the Methodist Episcopal, Methodist Episcopal Church, South, and the Methodist Protestant Church united in 1939. Its affiliation changed to the United Methodist Church after the Methodist Church united with the Evangelical United Brethren Church in 1968. The church building was added to the National Register of Historic Places in 2004.
