= Stringtown House =

Historic house in Iowa, United States

- U.S. National Register of Historic Places
- Location within Iowa Location within the United States
- Location: East of Bloomfield off Iowa Highway 2
- Nearest city: Troy, Iowa
- Coordinates: 40°43′51″N 92°12′01″W
- Area: less than one acre
- Built: 1832
- Architectural style: Saltbox
- NRHP reference No.: 74000780
- Added to NRHP: April 16, 1974

The Stringtown House is located east of Bloomfield near the unincorporated community of Troy in rural Davis County, Iowa, United States. Stringtown was the first town to be established in the county. It was originally named Harpersville, then it was changed to Dover, before it became Stringtown. At one point in time, the town had a mill, store, and hotel and other houses, but none of them are extant. Byron Wilson built this house in 1832. It is believed to be the oldest house still standing in the county, and the only one in its original condition. It is a 1½-story frame Saltbox structure was used as a stagecoach stop. The house was listed on the National Register of Historic Places in 1974.
