= James B. Weaver House =

Historic house in Iowa, United States

- U.S. National Register of Historic Places
- U.S. National Historic Landmark
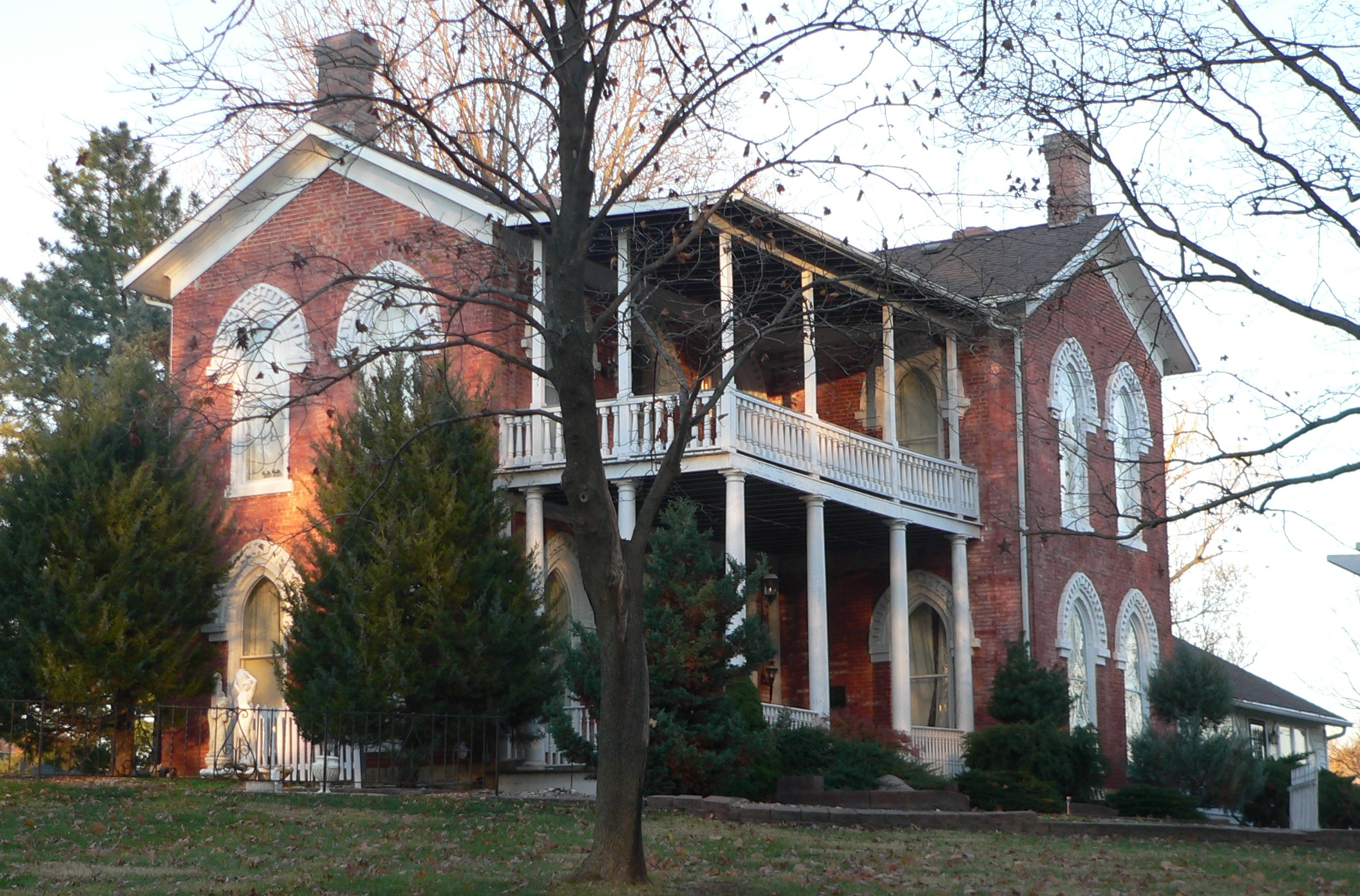

- Location within Iowa Location within the United States
- Location: 102 Weaver Road; Bloomfield, Iowa
- Coordinates: 40°45′19.2″N 92°24′45.4″W
- Area: 1 acre (0.40 ha)
- Built: 1865
- NRHP reference No.: 75000680

Significant dates
- Added to NRHP: May 15, 1975
- Designated NHL: May 15, 1975

The James B. Weaver House is a historic house at 102 Weaver Road (United States Route 63) in Bloomfield, Iowa. Built in 1865, it was the home of James Weaver (1833-1912) until 1890. Weaver, a populist and anti-monopolist, was the Greenback candidate for president in 1880 and the Populist candidate in 1892. The house was declared a National Historic Landmark in 1975.

== Description and history ==
The Weaver House is located north of downtown Bloomfield, on the east side of Weaver Road just north of its junction with North Street. It is a two-story L-shaped brick structure, with a gabled roof, five corbelled chimneys, and a single-story ell to the rear. A two-story porch is set in the crook of the L. The most prominent feature of the exterior is the windows of its principal elevations, which are set in arched openings framed by dentillated brick hoods.

The house was built in 1865 for James B. Weaver, an Ohio native who settled in newly formed Bloomfield in 1847. Politically active, he helped organize Iowa's Republican Party, and served in the Union Army in the American Civil War. A champion of the rural farm electorate, he ran for President of the United States on the Greenback Party ticket in 1880, and the populist People's Party in 1892, having helped form the party out of a group of reform-oriented organizations the previous year.

Weaver lived in this house until 1890, when he moved to Des Moines. After passing through several private owners, it was acquired by the Davis County Chautauqua Association, which operated it for a time as a historic house museum. It was eventually returned to private ownership.

== See also ==
- List of National Historic Landmarks in Iowa
- National Register of Historic Places listings in Davis County, Iowa
