= William Findley House =

Historic house in Iowa, United States

- U.S. National Register of Historic Places
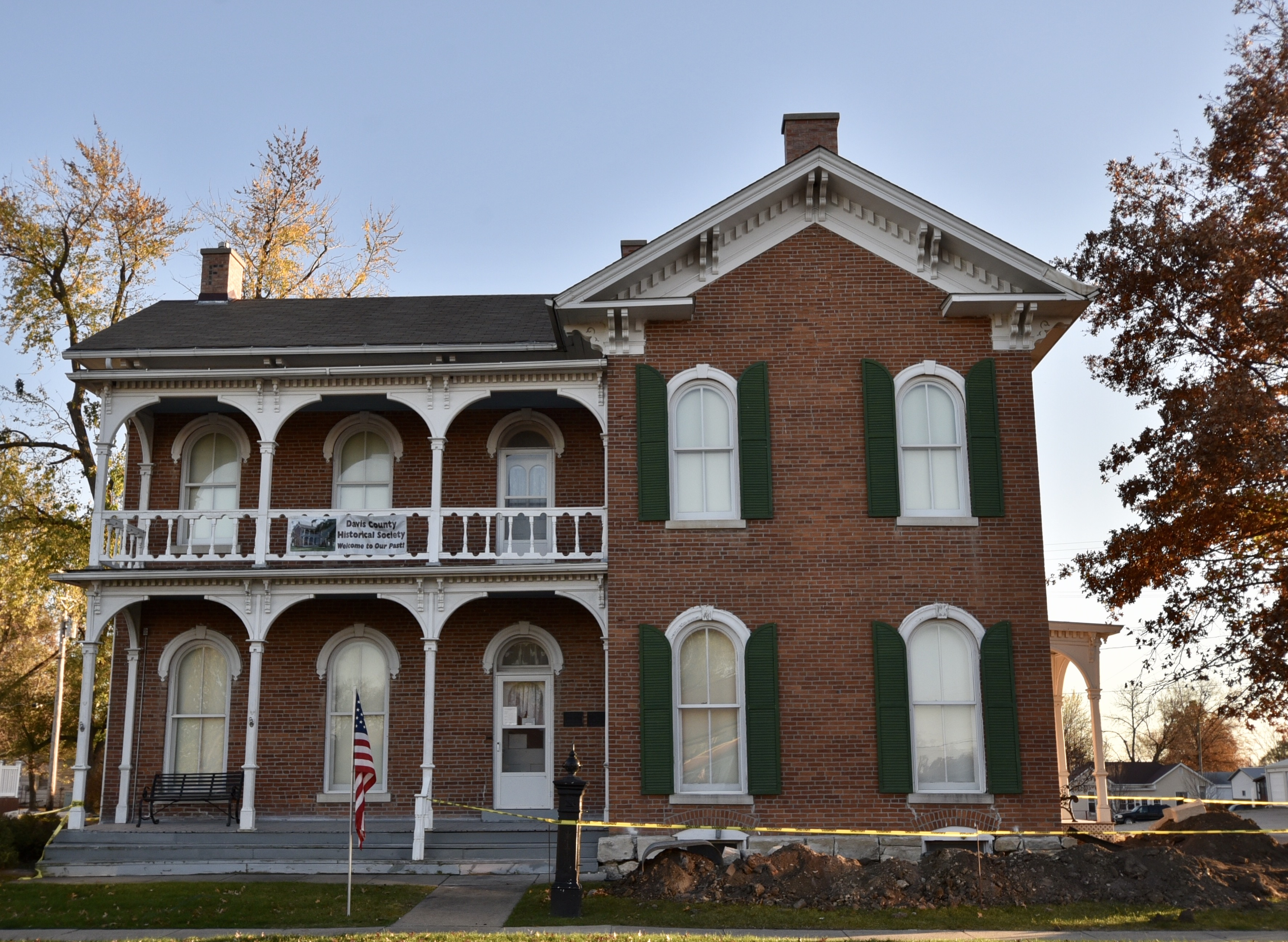

- Location within Iowa Location within the United States
- Location: 302 E. Franklin St. Bloomfield, Iowa
- Coordinates: 40°45′01″N 92°24′43″W
- Area: less than one acre
- Built: 1860
- Architectural style: Vernacular
- NRHP reference No.: 78001213
- Added to NRHP: June 9, 1978

The William Findley House, also known as the Davis County Historical Society Museum, is a historic residence located in Bloomfield, Iowa, United States. Dr. William M. Findley was the first owner of this house. A native of Dayton, Ohio, he settled in Bloomfield in 1843, where he practiced medicine. He was a surgeon for the 4th Iowa Cavalry during the Civil War. The T-shaped, vernacular structure is one of a very few brick houses in town, as the vast majority are frame construction. While it does not conform to any specific style, the wide, bracketed cornice does suggest the Italianate style. The frame summer kitchen that sat behind the house was torn down when the frame addition was built onto the back of the house in 1917. The addition contained the kitchen of a boarding house that occupied the building at that time. The William Findley House is now part of a museum complex that includes a Mormon log cabin, a livery barn, the Wheeler Ridge School, and the Savannah Christian Church. The other buildings were moved here. It was listed on the National Register of Historic Places in 1978.
