= West Grove, Iowa =

- Unincorporated community
- Location within the state of Iowa West Grove (the United States)
- Coordinates: 40°43′29″N 92°33′37″W
- Country: United States
- State: Iowa
- County: Davis
- Elevation: 942 ft (287 m)
- Time zone: UTC-6 (Central (CST))
  - Summer (DST): UTC-5 (CDT)
- ZIP codes: 52537
- GNIS feature ID: 462862

West Grove is an unincorporated community in western Davis County, Iowa, United States. It lies along Iowa Highway 2 west of the city of Bloomfield, the county seat of Davis County.

== History ==
West Grove's post office was established as the Weeping Willow post office on 21 June 1852 before being changed to West Grove on 19 February 1856. It was discontinued on 31 August 1959 and attached to the Bloomfield post office. Although its post office is gone, West Grove has its own ZIP Code, 52537, even though the ZIP Code system was not implemented until several years after West Grove's post office was attached to Bloomfield's.

West Grove was laid out as a town in 1853.

The population was 105 in 1940.
