= Bloomfield Square =

- U.S. National Register of Historic Places
- U.S. Historic district
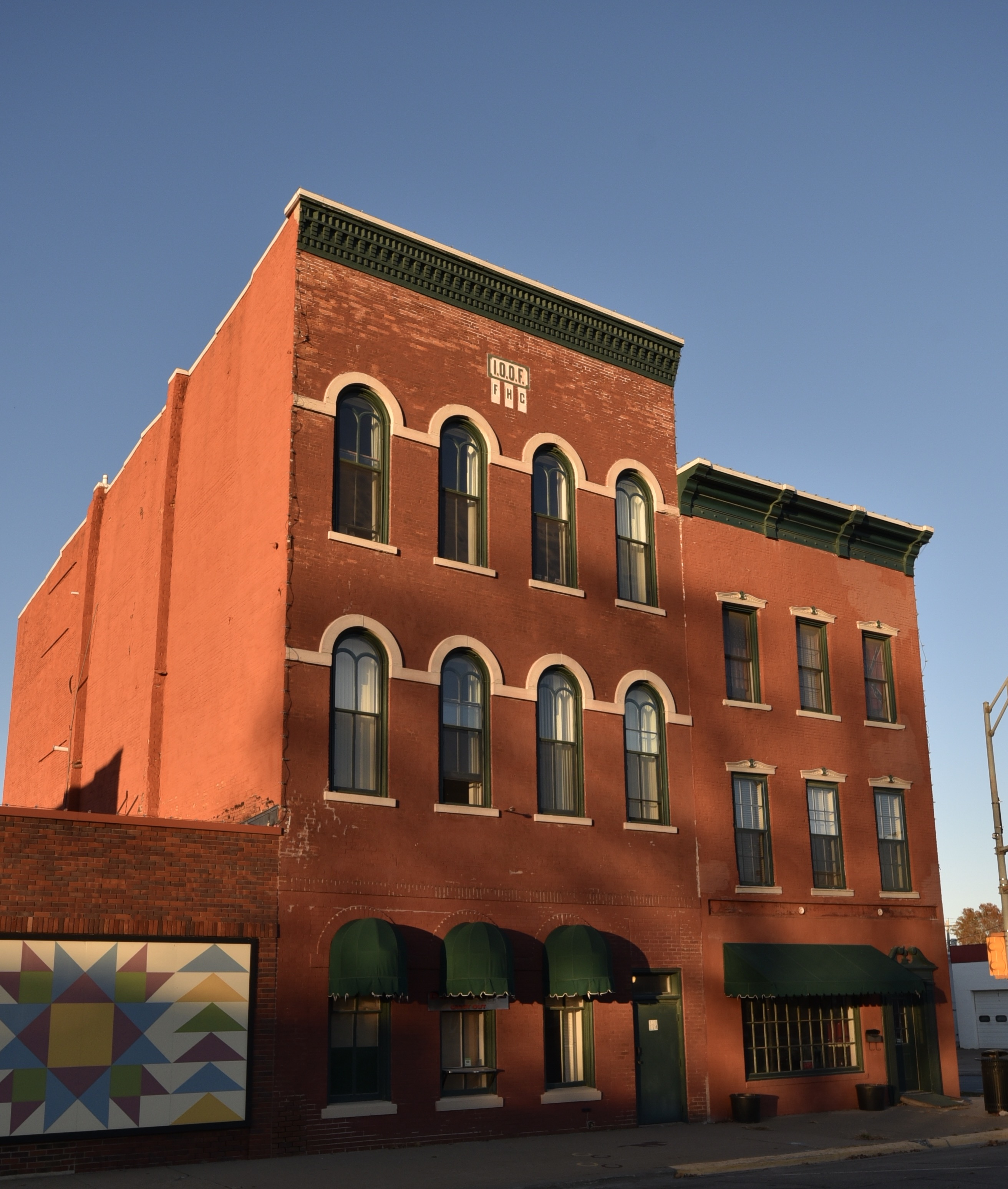

- Location within Iowa Location within the United States
- Location: Madison, Jefferson, Franklin, and Washington Sts., Bloomfield, Iowa
- Coordinates: 40°45′05″N 92°24′52″W
- Area: less than one acre
- Architectural style: Late Victorian
- NRHP reference No.: 76000756
- Added to NRHP: November 7, 1976

Bloomfield Square is a historic district in Bloomfield, Iowa, United States. It consists of the Davis County Courthouse, located on a central park, surrounded by 55 commercial buildings. The buildings were all built between the 1850s and the 1890s. Most of the buildings are of brick construction with no early frame buildings on the square. No one architectural style predominates. The block that faces Franklin Street burned to the ground in 1893, and was rebuilt that same year. The use of pressed tin and the many engaged columns on the second floor level are noteworthy on this block. The Second Empire courthouse (1877) is the focal point for the district. The historic district was listed on the National Register of Historic Places in 1976.

== Significance ==
Bloomfield Square is significant for its architectural style, which preserves much of its Victorian-era charm. The district, though varied in building quality, forms a unified collection of late 19th-century commercial architecture that showcases a small Midwestern town's shift from simpler wood structures to more ornate brick buildings. This design serves as a fitting backdrop for the central courthouse, surrounded by green spaces and historic commercial buildings that embody the town planning of 19th-century America. However, the district retains its late-Victorian character, distinguishing it from other preserved areas.

Several buildings contribute to Bloomfield Square's historical importance. The Exchange Bank Building, originally used by the Independent Order of Odd Fellows in the 1850s, later became home to the first Rebekah lodge, a women's auxiliary, in 1868. The Exchange Bank itself moved in during 1871, following the completion of the building's west side. Another noteworthy site, 101 E. Jefferson, began as J.R. Shaeffer's Jewelry Store; Shaeffer's son later established the Shaeffer Pen Company. Built in 1881, the Trimble House served as a hotel for many years, operated by local figure J.H. Trimble. Bloomfield's Opera House, located on the upper floor of #52, hosted numerous performances. Meanwhile, #69-71 originally functioned as a store and residence, later evolving into the American Hotel in the 1850s, and has since operated under names such as the New Commercial, Wishard, and Gandy, finally becoming known as the Grant Hotel.
