= Bloomfield Public Library =

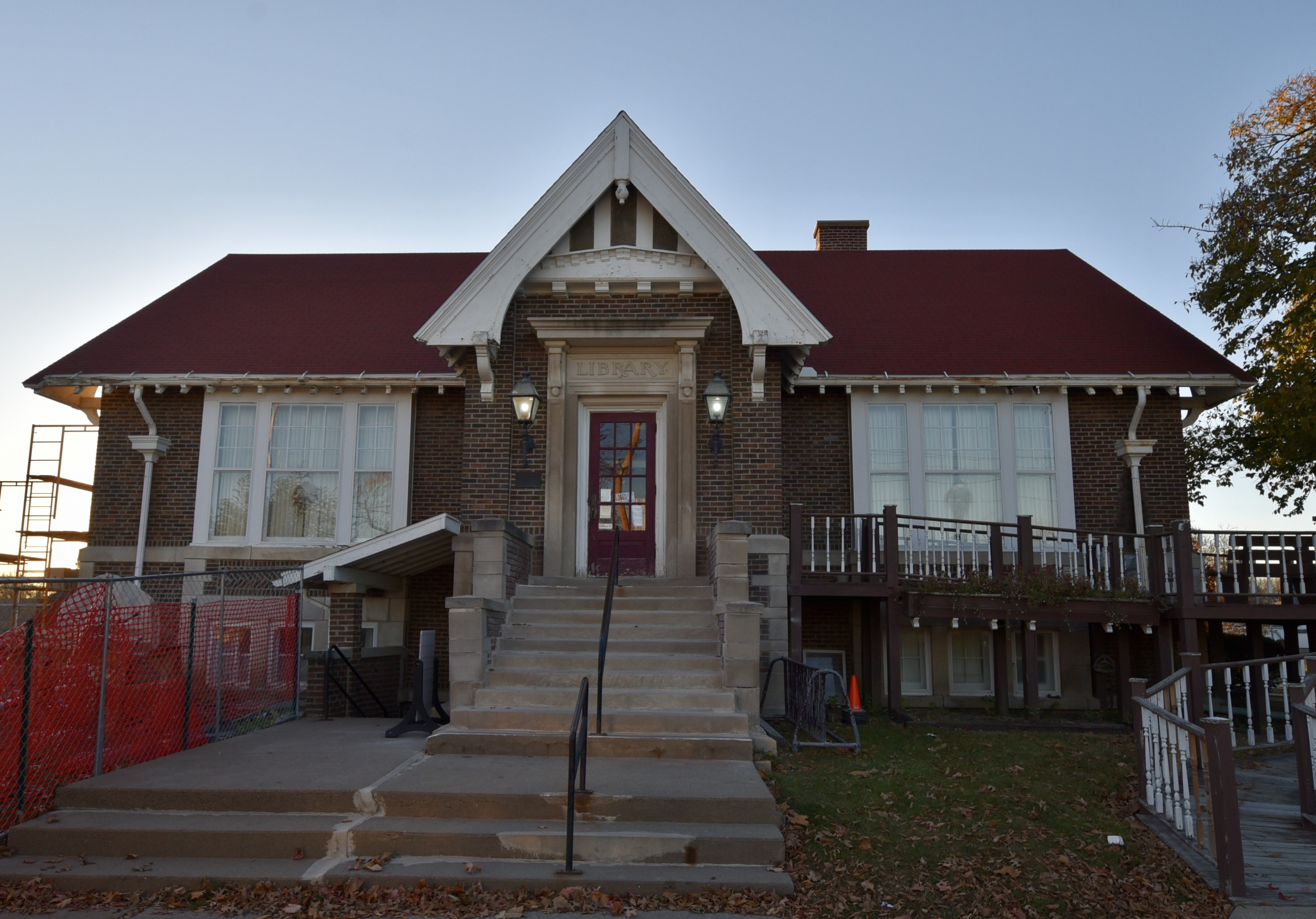
- Location: 107 N. Columbia; Bloomfield, Iowa, United States
- Type: Public
- Established: 1913
- Architect: Frank E. Wetherell

Other information
- Director: Anne Tews
- Website: www.bloomfield.lib.ia.us
- Bloomfield Public Library
- U.S. National Register of Historic Places
- Location within Iowa Location within the United States
- Coordinates: 40°45′09″N 92°24′59″W
- Area: Less than one acre
- Built: 1913
- Built by: C.W. Ennis
- Architect: Frank E. Wetherell
- Architectural style: Tudor Revival
- NRHP reference No.: 15000721
- Added to NRHP: October 13, 2015

Bloomfield Public Library is a public library located in Bloomfield, Iowa, United States. A library in Bloomfield dates back to the 1870s when a library association was established. One had to pay a subscription fee in order to borrow books. The Carnegie Corporation of New York had accepted the Commercial Club of Bloomfield's application for a grant for $10,000 on November 21, 1911. An election on December 30, 1911, approved constructing new public library in town. The building was designed by Frank E. Wetherell of the Des Moines architectural firm of Wetherall and Gage, and contractor C.W. Ennis constructed it. The new library was dedicated on August 8, 1913. The library is a brick, side gable structure with a projecting entrance on the long side of the building. Both the entrance and the side elevations of the building feature Tudor Revival vergeboards and half-timbered gable ends. The collection includes books in large print, regular print, hard back books and paperbacks, movies, and books-on-CD. Other services include public computers, a young adult section, and a children's area. The building was listed on the National Register of Historic Places in 2015.
