= Trimble–Parker Historic Farmstead District =

Historic district in Iowa, United States

- U.S. National Register of Historic Places
- U.S. Historic district
- Location within Iowa Location within the United States
- Location: 23981 240th St. Bloomfield, Iowa
- Coordinates: 40°43′01″N 92°22′12″W
- Architect: Joseph E. Wing
- Architectural style: Bungalow; American Craftsman
- NRHP reference No.: 03000125
- Added to NRHP: March 21, 2003

Trimble–Parker Historic Farmstead District is a historic farm located in Davis County, Iowa, United States near the county seat of Bloomfield. The well-preserved farm buildings exemplify an early 20th-century stock farm in Iowa. The various stock buildings were built between 1901 and 1952. They housed a variety of stock types. The barn, which is a local landmark, was designed by Joseph E. Wing who was well known for his innovative designs in the late 19th and early 20th centuries. The farmstead was listed on the National Register of Historic Places in 2003.
