= Asa Wilson House =

Historic house in Iowa, United States

- U.S. National Register of Historic Places
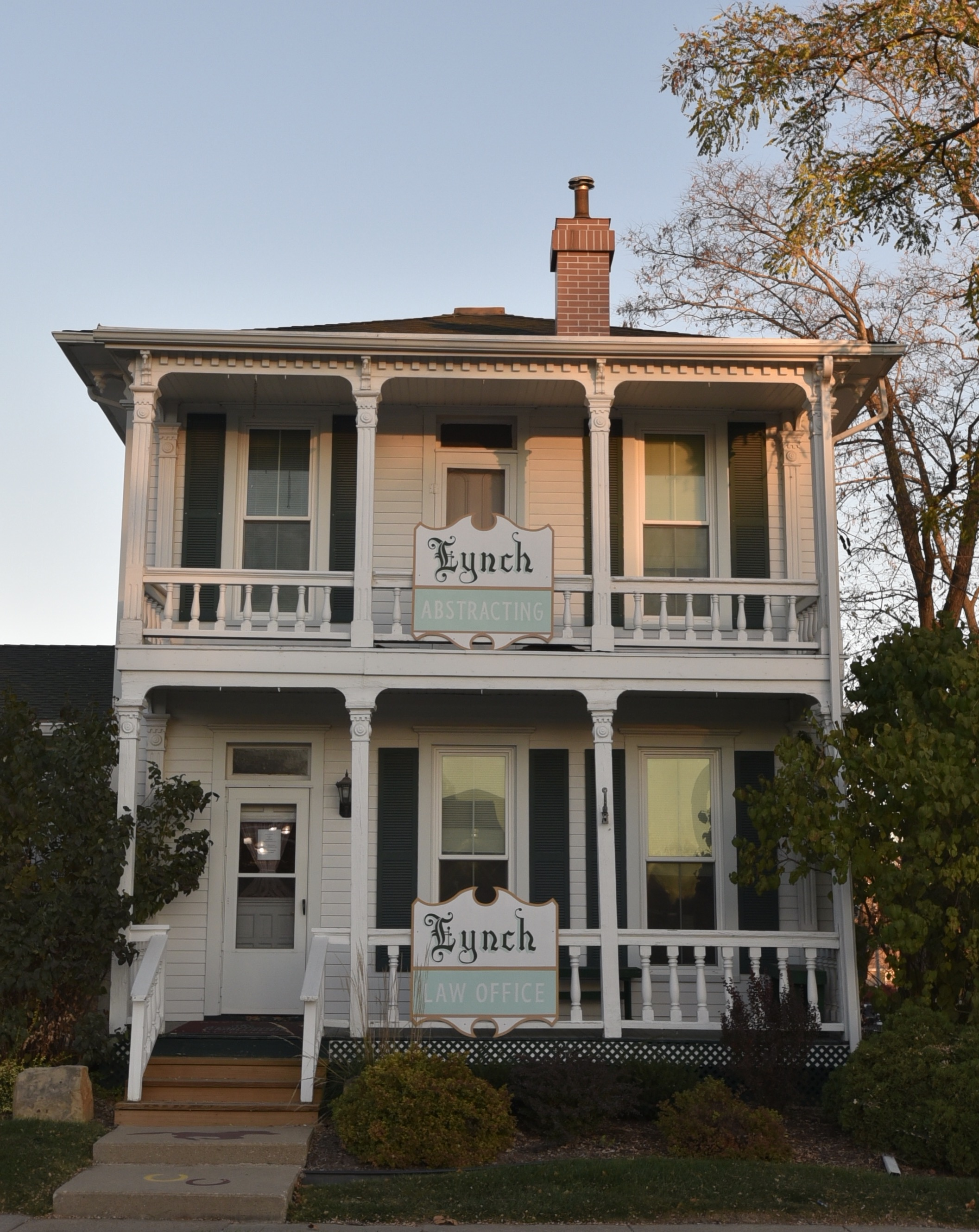

- Location within Iowa Location within the United States
- Location: 207 S. Washington; Bloomfield, Iowa
- Coordinates: 40°44′59″N 92°24′48″W
- Area: less than one acre
- Built: 1884
- Architectural style: Italianate
- NRHP reference No.: 82000404
- Added to NRHP: December 10, 1982

The Asa Wilson House is a historic residence located in Bloomfield, Iowa, United States. Asa Wilson arrived in Bloomfield in 1863 and bought this property the following year. He built this house in 1884, the year he died. The property remained in his family until the turn of the 20th century. The two-story frame house is a vernacular Italianate-style building. A two-story, full size porch covers the main facade, and the whole structure is capped with a hip roof. The house has been transformed into an office building. It was listed on the National Register of Historic Places in 1982.
