= Davis County Courthouse (Iowa) =

- U.S. National Register of Historic Places
- U.S. Historic district – Contributing property
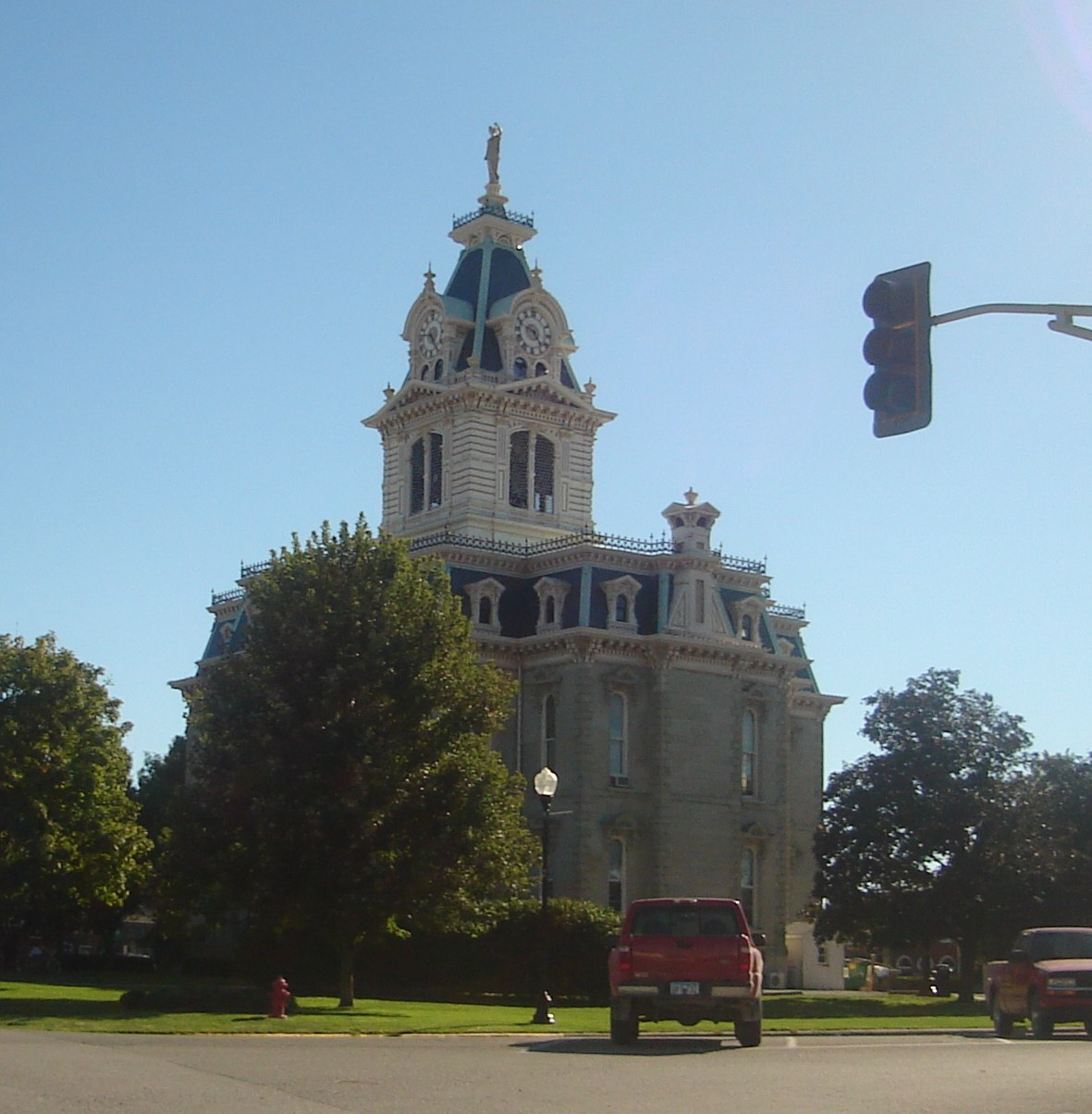
- The Davis County courthouse in downtown Bloomfield

- Location within Iowa Location within the United States
- Interactive map showing the location for Davis County Courthouse
- Location: Bloomfield Town Square; Bloomfield, Iowa
- Coordinates: 40°45′10″N 92°25′1″W
- Area: 3 acres (1.2 ha)
- Built: 1877
- Built by: John Lane; Larkworthy and Menke
- Architect: T.J. Tolan & Sons
- Architectural style: Second Empire
- Part of: Bloomfield Square (ID76000756)
- MPS: County Courthouses in Iowa TR
- NRHP reference No.: 74000779
- Added to NRHP: May 3, 1974

The Davis County Courthouse in Bloomfield, Iowa, United States was built in 1877. It was individually listed on the National Register of Historic Places in 1974. Two years later it was listed as a contributing property in the Bloomfield Square historic district. The courthouse is the second building to house court functions and county administration.

== History ==
Davis County's first courthouse was a two-story log structure measuring 24 by 40 feet (7.3 m × 12.2 m) and constructed for $339. Repairs were made to the building in 1846 and 1848. By 1851, the building was unusable and space for a courtroom was rented for $100 per year. The county started using a Methodist church for a courtroom in 1863. By 1869 the county was paying $300 a year in rent, but voters continuously voted down proposals to build a new courthouse. Finally, in 1875, voters authorized the construction of the present courthouse, but it was not to exceed $50,000.

The Second Empire structure was designed by the Fort Wayne, Indiana architectural firm T.J. Tolan & Sons. John Lane supervised construction and Larkworthy and Menke of Quincy, Illinois did the stonework. The Kimberly Bell Works of Troy, New York cast the bell, and the Seth Thomas Clock Company provided the four-faced clock. Both date from 1876. The building itself was completed in 1877. The old courthouse was purchased by D.C. Van Duyn for $50, and he moved it to his farm where it served as his house.

In addition to court functions and county administration, the courthouse has a served as a center for civic functions. Over the years it has hosted such events as band concerts, scrap metal drives during World War II, barbecues, and civic rallies.

== Architecture ==
The Second Empire structure is an example of post-Civil War architecture known as "General Grant Gothic." It is surrounded by a 300-square-foot (28 m^{2}) landscaped park. The two-story building measures 97 by 87 feet (30 m × 27 m). Its 16-inch (41 cm) brick walls are faced with Bedford stone. The building features a mansard roof, a cupola that serves as both a bell and clock tower, roof cresting, bracketed eaves, and Bedford stone-strimmed windows. The central tower is a wood structure that is topped by a statue of the goddess of Justice. It is visible from miles away, and it is the focal point for the community.
