= Henry Wishard House =

Historic house in Iowa, United States

- U.S. National Register of Historic Places
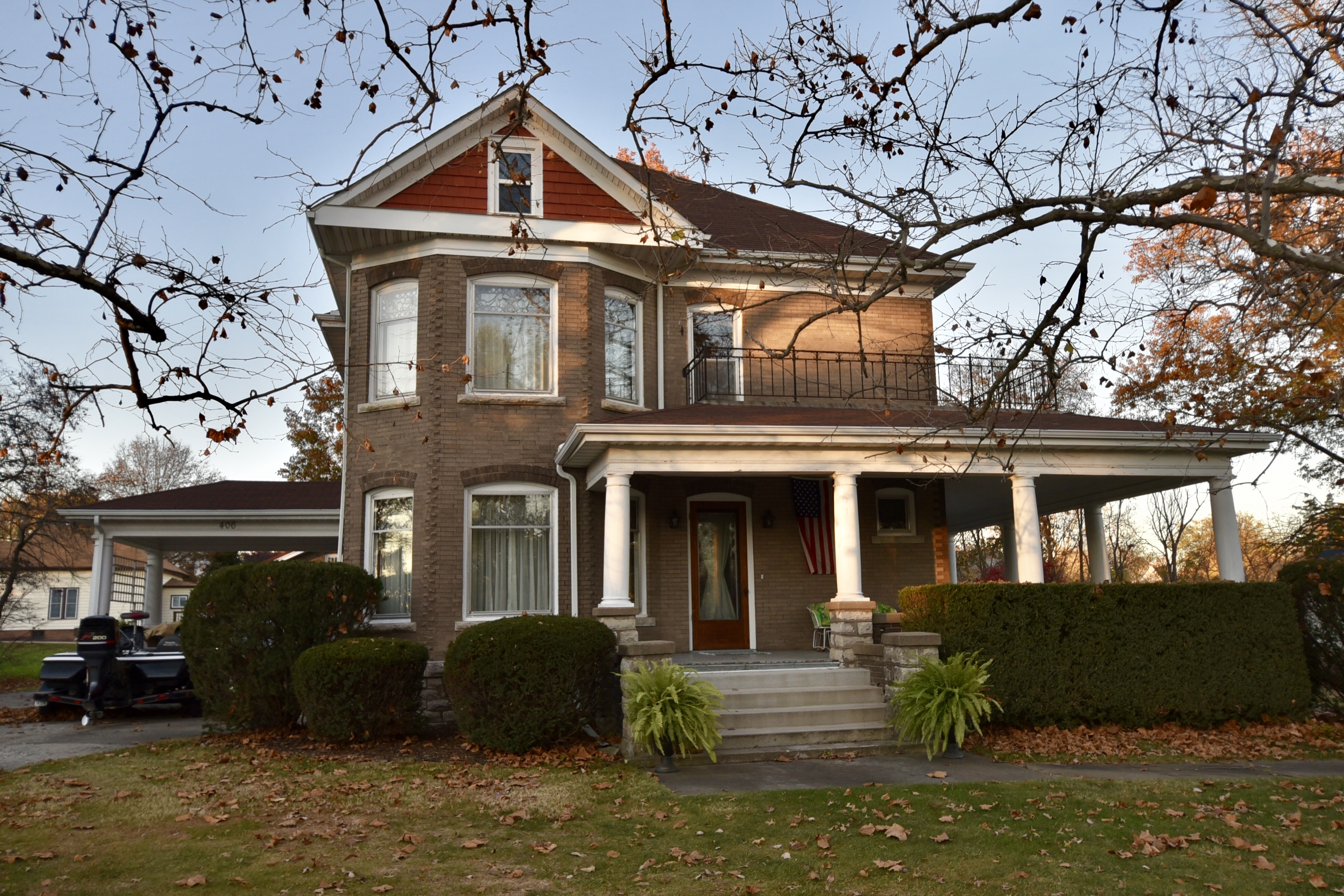

- Location within Iowa Location within the United States
- Location: 406 W. Jefferson St. Bloomfield, Iowa
- Coordinates: 40°45′0″N 92°24′26″W
- Area: less than one acre
- Built: 1908-1910
- Architectural style: Queen Anne
- NRHP reference No.: 04001350
- Added to NRHP: December 15, 2004

The Henry Wishard House, also known as the Fenton House, is a historic residence located in Bloomfield, Iowa, United States. Wishard was a prominent Bloomfield businessman, who was known as the father of the gasoline tax in the United States to raise revenue for road construction. He also built more than 100 buildings in Bloomfield and Dighton, Kansas. Wishard had this two-story brick house built in the Queen Anne style in 1910. The property also included a barn, a chicken house and another small out-building. The barn was replaced with a garage that complements the house, and the other two structures have subsequently been removed. The house was listed on the National Register of Historic Places in 2004.
