= Bloomfield, Iowa =

- City
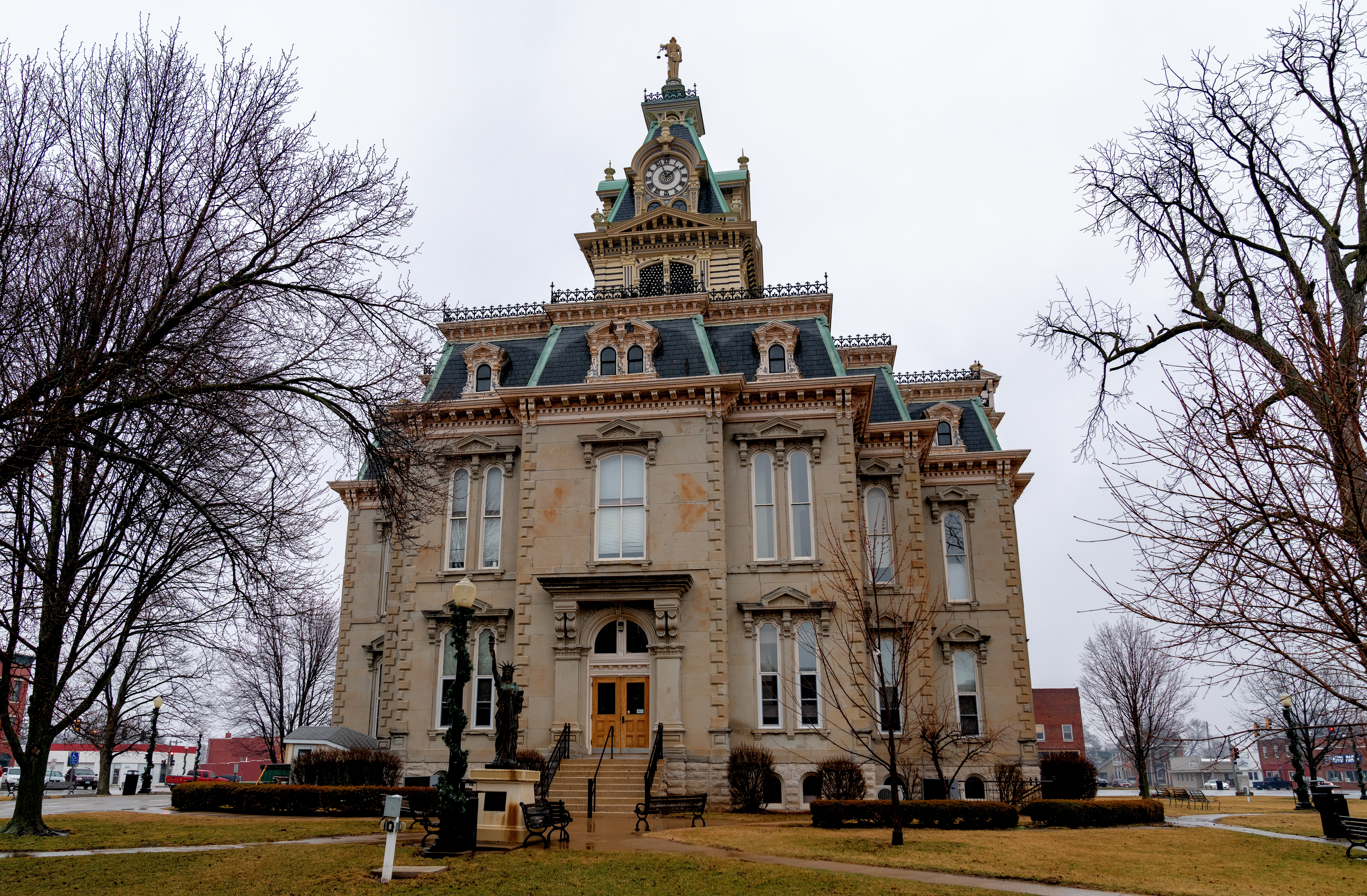
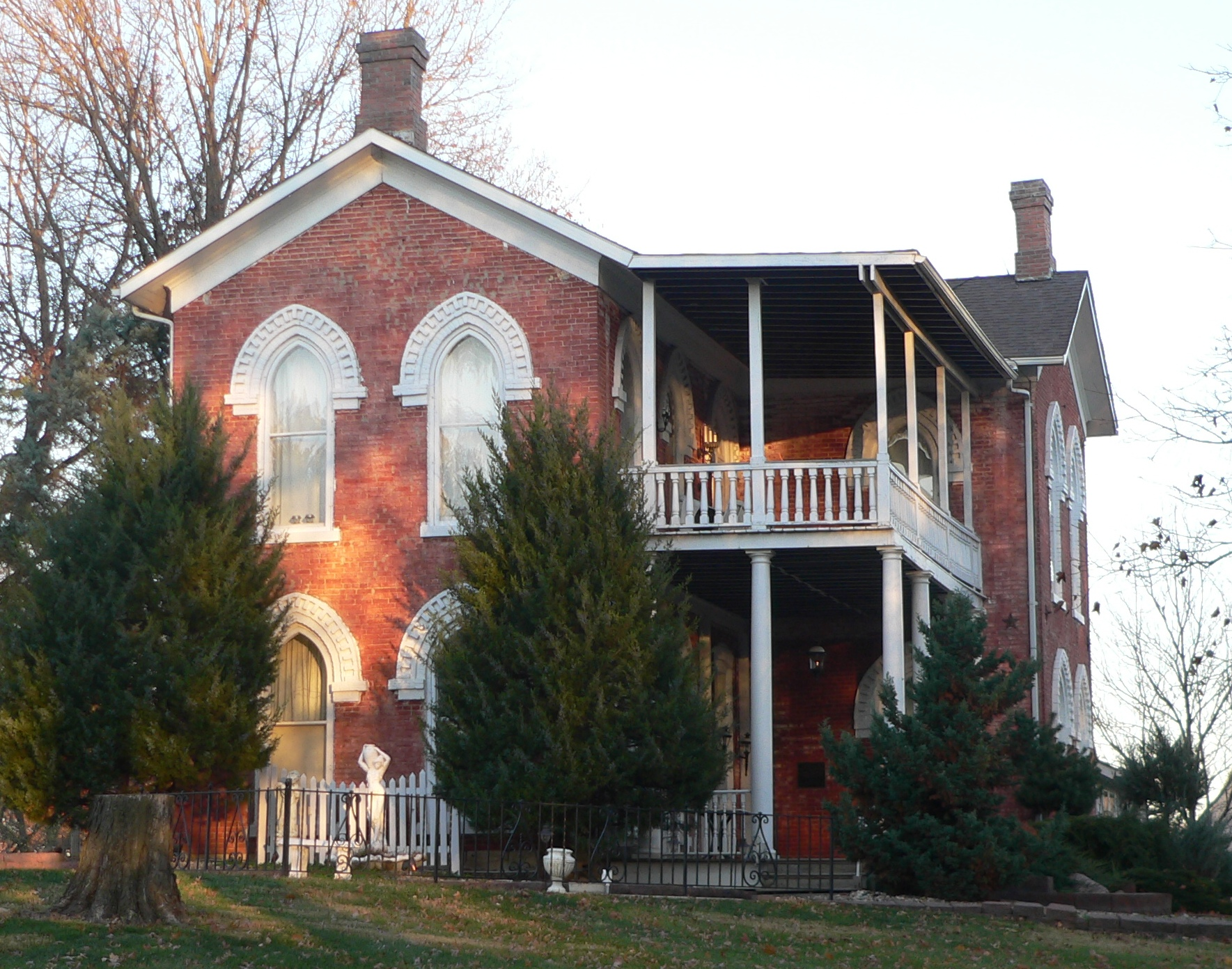
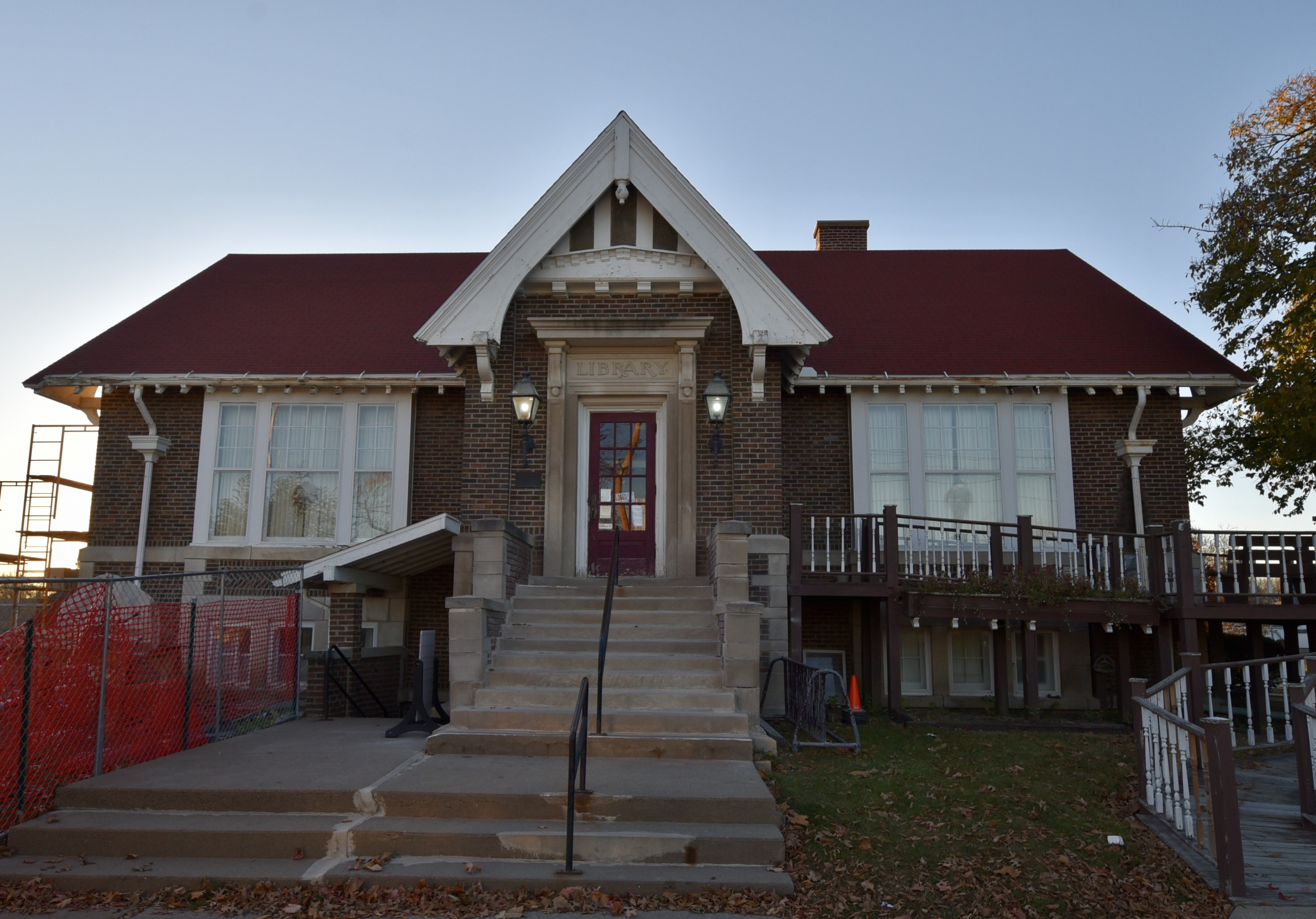
- Davis County Courthouse James B. Weaver House Bloomfield Public Library

- Logo
- Motto: Dirtville
- Location of Bloomfield, Iowa
- Coordinates: 40°45′04″N 92°25′02″W
- Country: United States
- State: Iowa
- County: Davis

Area
  - Total: 2.30 sq mi (5.96 km^{2})
  - Land: 2.27 sq mi (5.89 km^{2})
  - Water: 0.027 sq mi (0.07 km^{2})
- Elevation: 840 ft (260 m)

Population (2020)
  - Total: 2,682
  - Density: 1,179/sq mi (455.4/km^{2})
- Time zone: UTC-6 (Central (CST))
  - Summer (DST): UTC-5 (CDT)
- ZIP codes: 52537-52538
- Area code: 641
- FIPS code: 19-07030
- GNIS feature ID: 0454700
- Website: www.cityofbloomfield.org

Bloomfield is a city in and the county seat of Davis County, Iowa, United States. The population was 2,682 at the 2020 census.

== History ==
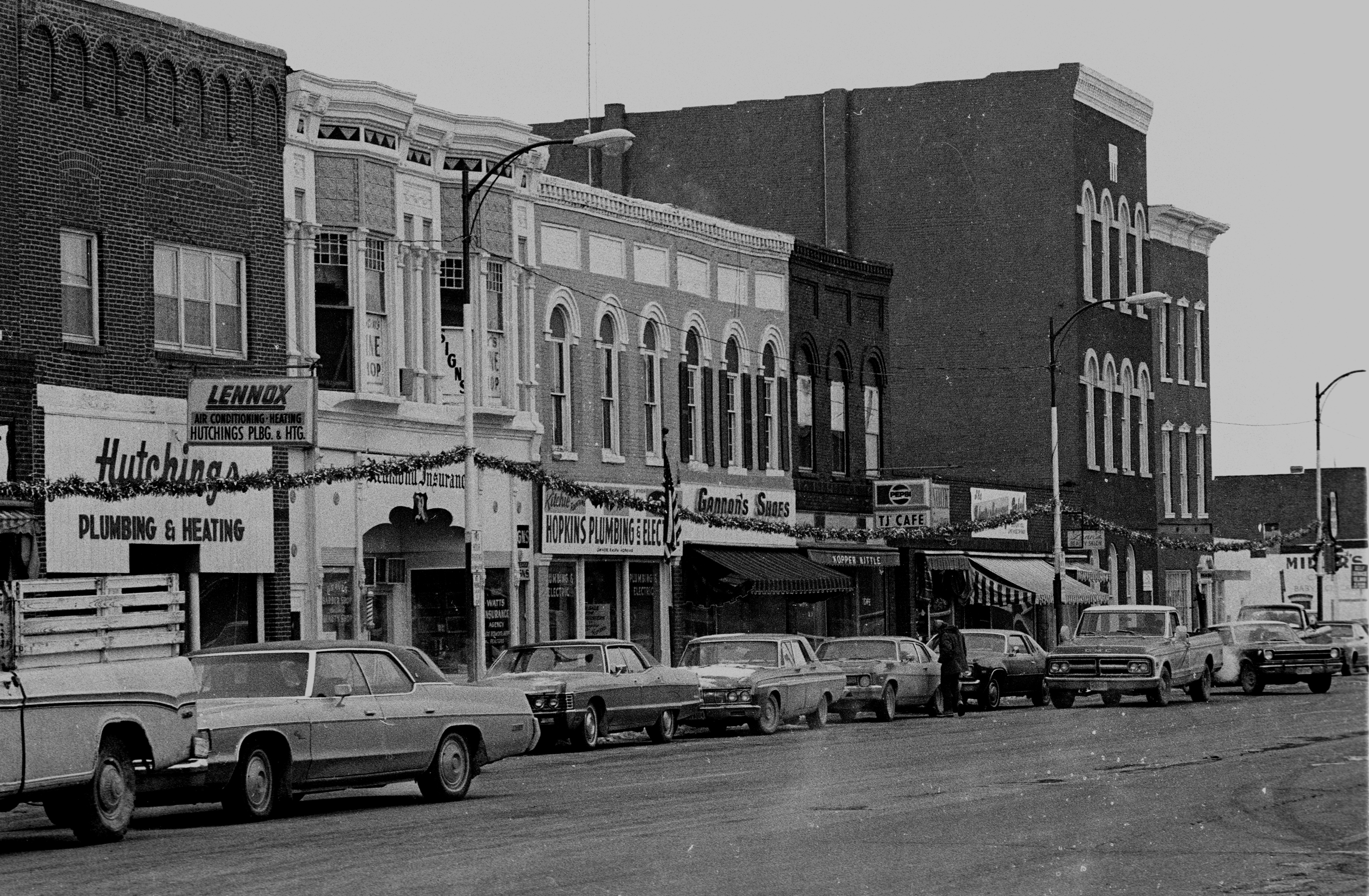
Bloomfield Square, 1976

Bloomfield was incorporated on January 3, 1855. On October 12, 1864 a small group of Confederate soldiers began a raid on the town. The raid would result in the death of three citizens before the soldiers retreated back into Missouri.

== Geography ==
Bloomfield is located in the southeastern part of Iowa, near the Missouri border.
Bloomfield's longitude and latitude coordinates in decimal form are 40.751122, -92.417007.

According to the United States Census Bureau, the city has a total area of 2.28 square miles (5.91 km^{2}), of which 2.25 square miles (5.83 km^{2}) is land and 0.03 square miles (0.08 km^{2}) is water.

=== Climate ===
According to the Köppen Climate Classification system, Bloomfield has a hot-summer humid continental climate, abbreviated "Dfa" on climate maps.

Climate data for Bloomfield, Iowa, 1991–2020 normals, extremes 1906–2020
Month	Jan	Feb	Mar	Apr	May	Jun	Jul	Aug	Sep	Oct	Nov	Dec	Year
Record high °F (°C)	70 (21)	75 (24)	90 (32)	89 (32)	95 (35)	104 (40)	113 (45)	110 (43)	108 (42)	97 (36)	83 (28)	70 (21)	113 (45)
Mean maximum °F (°C)	55.9 (13.3)	58.3 (14.6)	73.6 (23.1)	81.4 (27.4)	86.1 (30.1)	91.5 (33.1)	95.3 (35.2)	95.0 (35.0)	90.6 (32.6)	82.2 (27.9)	69.6 (20.9)	59.1 (15.1)	94.6 (34.8)
Mean daily maximum °F (°C)	31.9 (−0.1)	36.8 (2.7)	49.5 (9.7)	61.9 (16.6)	72.0 (22.2)	81.2 (27.3)	85.5 (29.7)	84.1 (28.9)	77.1 (25.1)	64.4 (18.0)	49.6 (9.8)	37.0 (2.8)	60.9 (16.1)
Daily mean °F (°C)	23.4 (−4.8)	27.6 (−2.4)	39.5 (4.2)	51.2 (10.7)	62.1 (16.7)	71.7 (22.1)	75.9 (24.4)	74.0 (23.3)	66.0 (18.9)	53.8 (12.1)	40.4 (4.7)	28.9 (−1.7)	51.2 (10.7)
Mean daily minimum °F (°C)	14.8 (−9.6)	18.5 (−7.5)	29.5 (−1.4)	40.5 (4.7)	52.2 (11.2)	62.2 (16.8)	66.3 (19.1)	63.9 (17.7)	54.9 (12.7)	43.2 (6.2)	31.1 (−0.5)	20.7 (−6.3)	41.5 (5.3)
Mean minimum °F (°C)	−6.6 (−21.4)	−2.6 (−19.2)	8.2 (−13.2)	26.4 (−3.1)	38.0 (3.3)	49.0 (9.4)	55.2 (12.9)	53.3 (11.8)	38.8 (3.8)	27.7 (−2.4)	14.0 (−10.0)	0.3 (−17.6)	−10.0 (−23.3)
Record low °F (°C)	−29 (−34)	−26 (−32)	−19 (−28)	10 (−12)	22 (−6)	36 (2)	43 (6)	40 (4)	23 (−5)	14 (−10)	−11 (−24)	−23 (−31)	−29 (−34)
Average precipitation inches (mm)	1.23 (31)	1.60 (41)	2.23 (57)	3.70 (94)	5.51 (140)	5.36 (136)	4.45 (113)	4.74 (120)	3.95 (100)	2.70 (69)	2.12 (54)	1.51 (38)	39.1 (993)
Average snowfall inches (cm)	7.4 (19)	5.5 (14)	3.2 (8.1)	1.5 (3.8)	0.0 (0.0)	0.0 (0.0)	0.0 (0.0)	0.0 (0.0)	0.0 (0.0)	0.0 (0.0)	1.5 (3.8)	5.1 (13)	24.2 (61.7)
Average precipitation days (≥ 0.01 in)	6.5	7.4	8.0	10.0	13.2	11.2	8.3	8.5	8.0	8.3	6.8	7.0	103.2
Average snowy days (≥ 0.1 in)	3.9	3.7	2.1	0.4	0.0	0.0	0.0	0.0	0.0	0.1	1.1	3.4	14.7
Source 1: NOAA
Source 2: National Weather Service

== Demographics ==
Historical population
Year	Pop.	±%
1850	287	—
1870	1,553	+441.1%
1880	1,531	−1.4%
1890	1,913	+25.0%
1900	2,105	+10.0%
1910	2,028	−3.7%
1920	2,064	+1.8%
1930	2,226	+7.8%
1940	2,732	+22.7%
1950	2,680	−1.9%
1960	2,771	+3.4%
1970	2,718	−1.9%
1980	2,849	+4.8%
1990	2,580	−9.4%
2000	2,601	+0.8%
2010	2,640	+1.5%
2020	2,682	+1.6%
Source: "U.S. Census website". United States Census Bureau. Source: U.S. Decennial Census

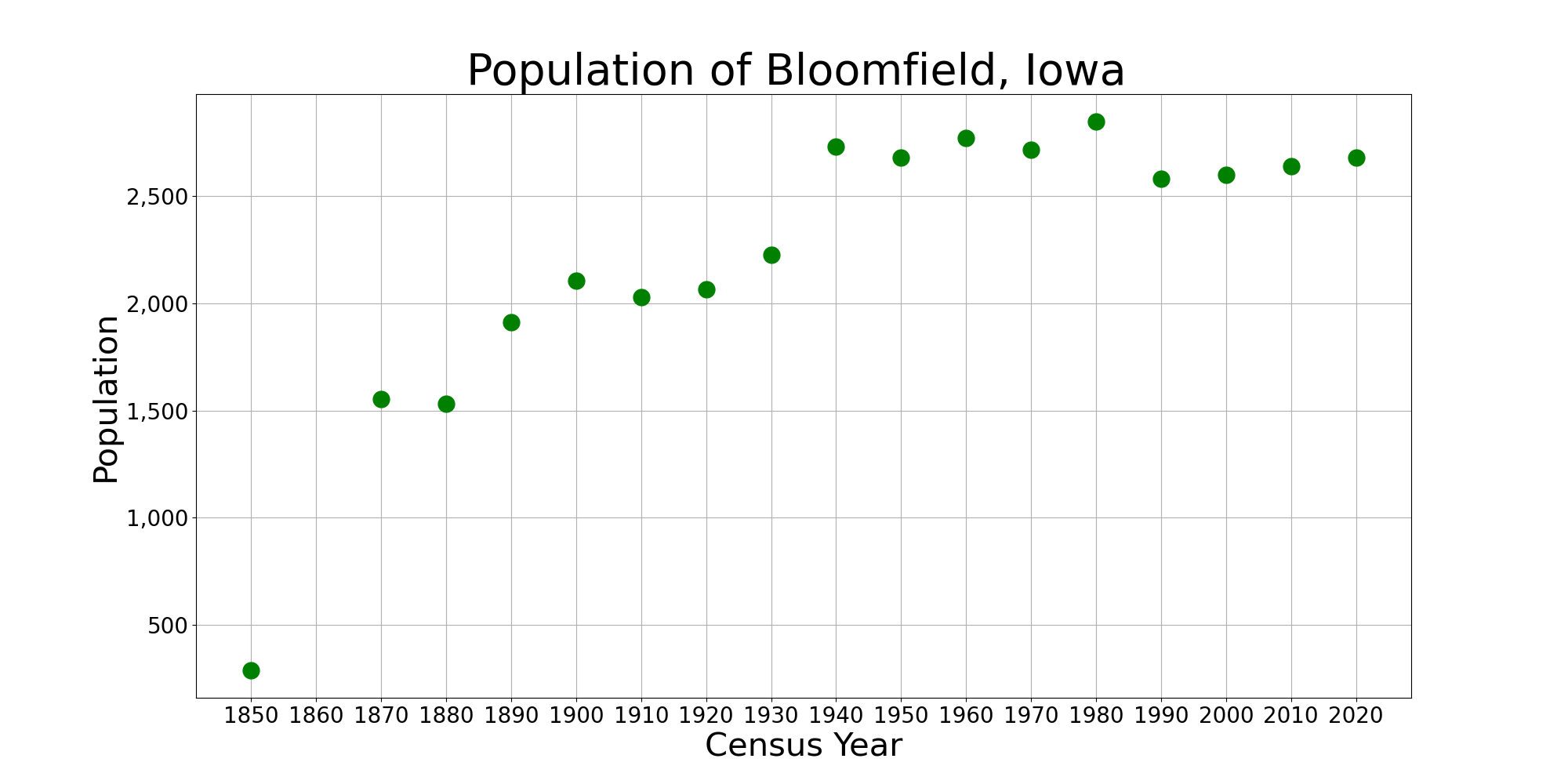
The population of Bloomfield, Iowa from US census data

=== 2020 census ===
As of the 2020 census, there were 2,682 people, 1,144 households, and 671 families residing in the city. The population density was 1,179.5 inhabitants per square mile (455.4/km^{2}). There were 1,243 housing units at an average density of 546.6 per square mile (211.1/km^{2}).

Of the 1,144 households, 29.4% had children under the age of 18 living with them. Of all households, 43.3% were married-couple households, 6.8% were cohabiting-couple households, 17.1% had a male householder with no spouse or partner present, and 32.8% had a female householder with no spouse or partner present. 41.3% of all households were non-families, 35.8% were made up of individuals, and 17.8% had someone living alone who was 65 years of age or older.

The median age in the city was 41.2 years. 24.6% of residents were under the age of 18 and 22.2% were 65 years of age or older. 27.2% of residents were under the age of 20; 4.9% were between the ages of 20 and 24; 22.3% were from 25 to 44; and 23.4% were from 45 to 64. The gender makeup of the city was 46.2% male and 53.8% female. For every 100 females there were 85.9 males, and for every 100 females age 18 and over there were 81.3 males age 18 and over.

0.0% of residents lived in urban areas, while 100.0% lived in rural areas.

Of housing units, 8.0% were vacant. The homeowner vacancy rate was 1.7% and the rental vacancy rate was 9.2%.

Racial composition as of the 2020 census
Race	Number	Percent
White	2,530	94.3%
Black or African American	2	0.1%
American Indian and Alaska Native	3	0.1%
Asian	13	0.5%
Native Hawaiian and Other Pacific Islander	0	0.0%
Some other race	37	1.4%
Two or more races	97	3.6%
Hispanic or Latino (of any race)	103	3.8%

=== 2010 census ===
As of the census of 2010, there were 2,640 people, 1,122 households, and 683 families living in the city. The population density was 1,173.3 inhabitants per square mile (453.0/km^{2}). There were 1,259 housing units at an average density of 559.6 per square mile (216.1/km^{2}). The racial makeup of the city was 98.3% White, 0.2% African American, 0.2% Native American, 0.4% Asian, 0.2% from other races, and 0.8% from two or more races. Hispanic or Latino of any race were 1.5% of the population.

There were 1,122 households, of which 29.9% had children under the age of 18 living with them, 46.9% were married couples living together, 9.4% had a female householder with no husband present, 4.5% had a male householder with no wife present, and 39.1% were non-families. 34.8% of all households were made up of individuals, and 19.4% had someone living alone who was 65 years of age or older. The average household size was 2.27 and the average family size was 2.89.

The median age in the city was 43 years. 23.2% of residents were under the age of 18; 8.1% were between the ages of 18 and 24; 21% were from 25 to 44; 25.2% were from 45 to 64; and 22.7% were 65 years of age or older. The gender makeup of the city was 46.0% male and 54.0% female.

=== 2000 census ===
As of the census of 2000, there were 2,601 people, 1,123 households, and 668 families living in the city. The population density was 1,145.0 inhabitants per square mile (442.1/km^{2}). There were 1,228 housing units at an average density of 540.6 per square mile (208.7/km^{2}). The racial makeup of the city was 98.54% White, 0.12% African American, 0.15% Native American, 0.19% Asian, 0.15% from other races, and 0.85% from two or more races. Hispanic or Latino of any race were 0.38% of the population.

There were 1,123 households, out of which 25.6% had children under the age of 18 living with them, 49.9% were married couples living together, 7.3% had a female householder with no husband present, and 40.5% were non-families. 36.0% of all households were made up of individuals, and 21.3% had someone living alone who was 65 years of age or older. The average household size was 2.18 and the average family size was 2.84.

Age spread: 20.8% under the age of 18, 7.5% from 18 to 24, 23.8% from 25 to 44, 21.5% from 45 to 64, and 26.5% who were 65 years of age or older. The median age was 43 years. For every 100 females, there were 82.0 males. For every 100 females age 18 and over, there were 77.4 males.

The median income for a household in the city was $31,471, and the median income for a family was $44,073. Males had a median income of $25,260 versus $23,686 for females. The per capita income for the city was $17,962. About 3.9% of families and 8.6% of the population were below the poverty line, including 11.3% of those under age 18 and 8.6% of those age 65 or over.

== Arts and culture ==
=== Annual events ===
The Davis County Fair is held each July, and the Davis County Country and Old Time Music Festival is held each September.

=== Historic sites ===
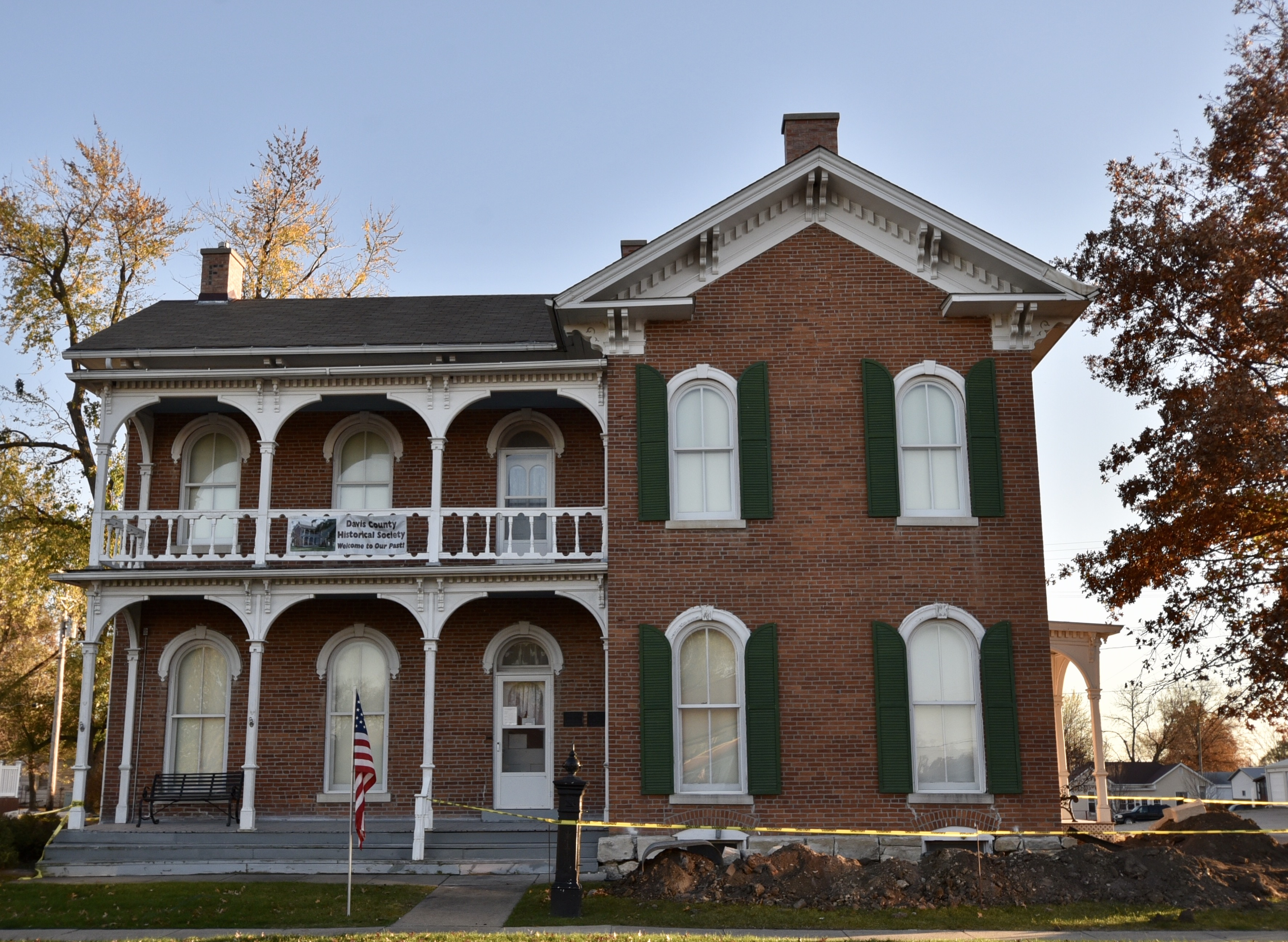
Findley House

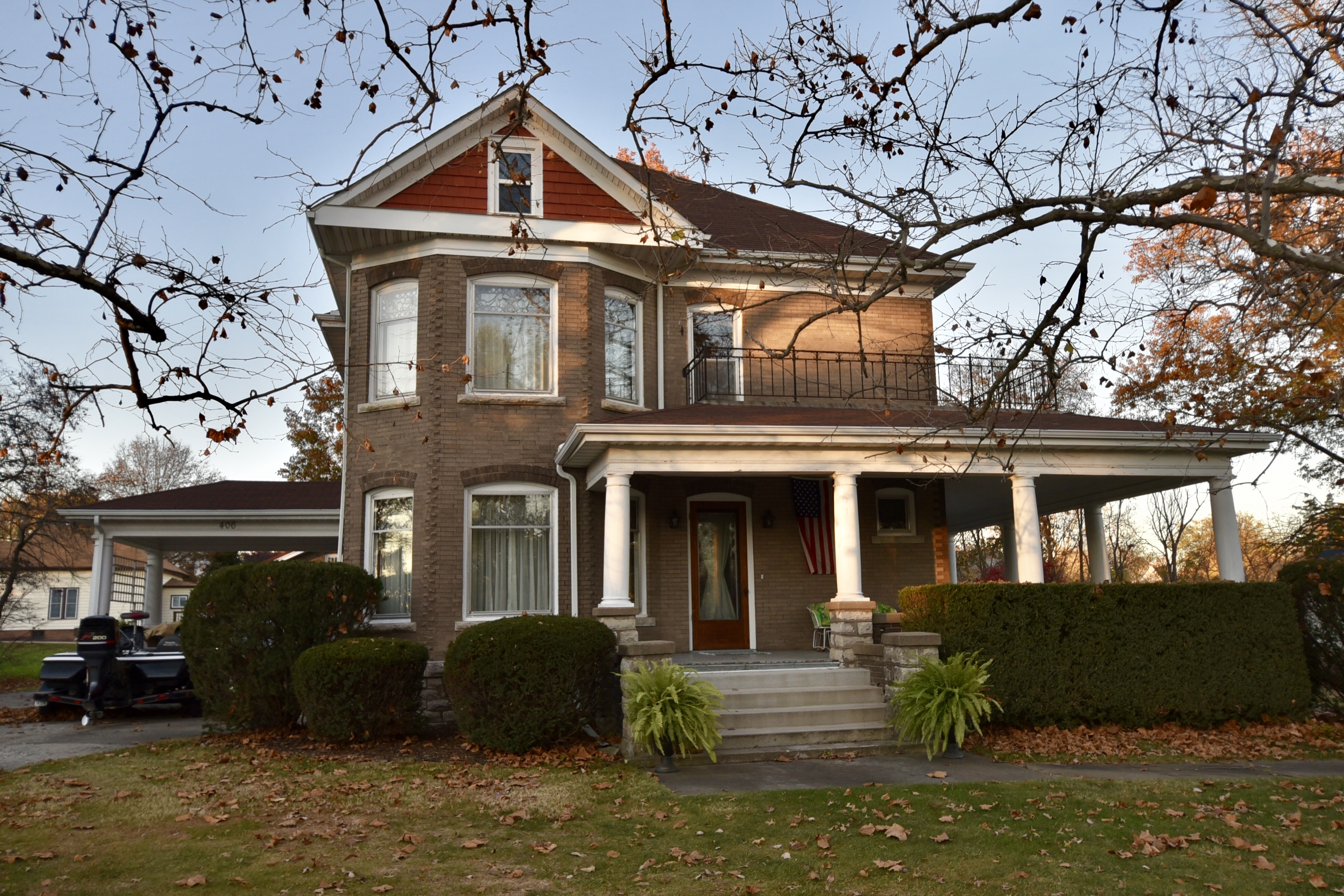
Henry Wishard House

Sites listed on the National Register of Historic Places include:

- Asa Wilson House
- Bloomfield Public Library
- Bloomfield Square
- Davis County Courthouse
- Henry Wishard House
- James B. Weaver House
- Trimble–Parker Historic Farmstead District
- William Findley House

== Education ==
The Davis County Community School District operates local area public schools.

== Infrastructure ==
Bloomfield lies at the junction of U.S. Route 63 and Iowa Highway 2.

== Notable people ==
- Barry Davis - member of the 1984 and 1988 Olympics winning silver in ‘84.
- Curt Bader - member of the 1988 and 1996 Olympic Kayak teams
- Clem Beauchamp - early motion picture actor; Academy Award winner
- Smith Wildman Brookhart - U.S. Senator
- Cyrus Bussey - Civil War Major General; Assistant Secretary of the Interior
- Beryl F. Carroll - Governor of Iowa
- George W. Clarke - Governor of Iowa
- Samuel O. Dunn - journalist; transportation specialist
- Cora Bussey Hillis - Children's rights advocate
- L.D. Hotchkiss - former editor-in-chief, Los Angeles Times
- John A. Hull - Major General; Judge Advocate General of the Army (1924–1928)
- John A.T. Hull - Iowa Secretary of State, Lt. Governor of Iowa
- Augustin Reed Humphrey - U.S. Representative from Nebraska
- John Henry Kyl - U.S. Representative
- Jon Kyl - U.S. Senator from Arizona
- Irvin S. Pepper - U.S. Representative
- Bertha Eaton Raffetto - composer of Home Means Nevada
- C. William Ramseyer - U.S. Representative
- Johnny Rawlings - major league baseball player
- Jack Reno - country singer, songwriter and disc jockey
- Kevin Ritz - major league pitcher
- Walter A. Sheaffer - founder of the Sheaffer Pen Company
- Erastus J. Turner - U.S. Representative from Kansas
- James Weaver - U.S. Representative
